= Marol, Baltistan =

Village in Gilgit-Baltistan, Pakistan

Marol مَرول མརོལ་།
- Village
- Interactive map of Marol
- Location in Gilgit-Baltistan, Pakistan Marol (Kashmir) Marol (Pakistan)
- Coordinates: 34.7568°N 76.2153°E
- Country: Pakistan
- Adm. Unit: Gilgit-Baltistan
- District: Kharmang District
- Elevation: 2,680 m (8,790 ft)
- Time zone: UTC+5:00 (PKT)

Marol is a village situated near the confluence of the Suru River and the Indus River in the Kharmang District of Baltistan, Pakistan. It is close to the Line of Control(LoC), the de facto India–Pakistan border in the disputed Kashmir region.

== Geography ==
Marol is at the confluence of the Suru River (also called Shingo River) with the Indus River, about 23 kilometres (14 mi) from the Line of Control (LOC) checkpost on the Suru River. Along the Indus River, the border village of Ganokh, inhabited by Brokpa people, is only 6 kilometres (3.7 mi) south of Marol, beyond which lie other Brokpa villages such as Batalik, Darchik, Garkhon, Dha and Hanu in Indian-administered Kashmir.

The main trade route between Baltistan and Ladakh used to pass through Marol, via the Suru River valley and Kargil town. It would then traverse the Wakha Rong valley, cross Namika La and Fotu La passes to rejoin the Indus Valley at Khalatse. (This is the route followed by modern National Highway 1 of India between Kargil and Leh at the present time.) The Indus gorge between Marol and Dha was avoided due to the difficulty of navigating the narrow gorge. But some trade did pass through this route, probably conducted by the Brokpa themselves, and taxes were collected by Baltistan at Ganokh.

== History ==
In the seventeenth century Jamyang Namgyal of Ladakh had a conflict with Ali Sher Khan Anchan of Skardu and had to accept Gurgurdo near Batalik as the boundary between Ladakh and Baltistan. During Dogra invasion by Zorawar Singh in 1840, the Balti defences are said to have been set up on the plateau to the north of Marol. The defences did not deter Zorawar Singh, but the Baltis' destruction of the Marol Bridge did cause him considerable problems later for reaching Skardu. The Raja of Kharmang, Sher Ali Khan, submitted to Zorawar Singh and provided cooperation. After the conquest of Baltistan, Kharmang was retained as a jagir of the Raja, and Marol as well as Ganokh were left under his jurisdiction.

== Demographics ==
During the British Raj period, Marol was said to have been inhabited by Balti as well as Brokpa people. It is said that there are no Brokpa language speakers in Marol at the present time.

== Maps ==
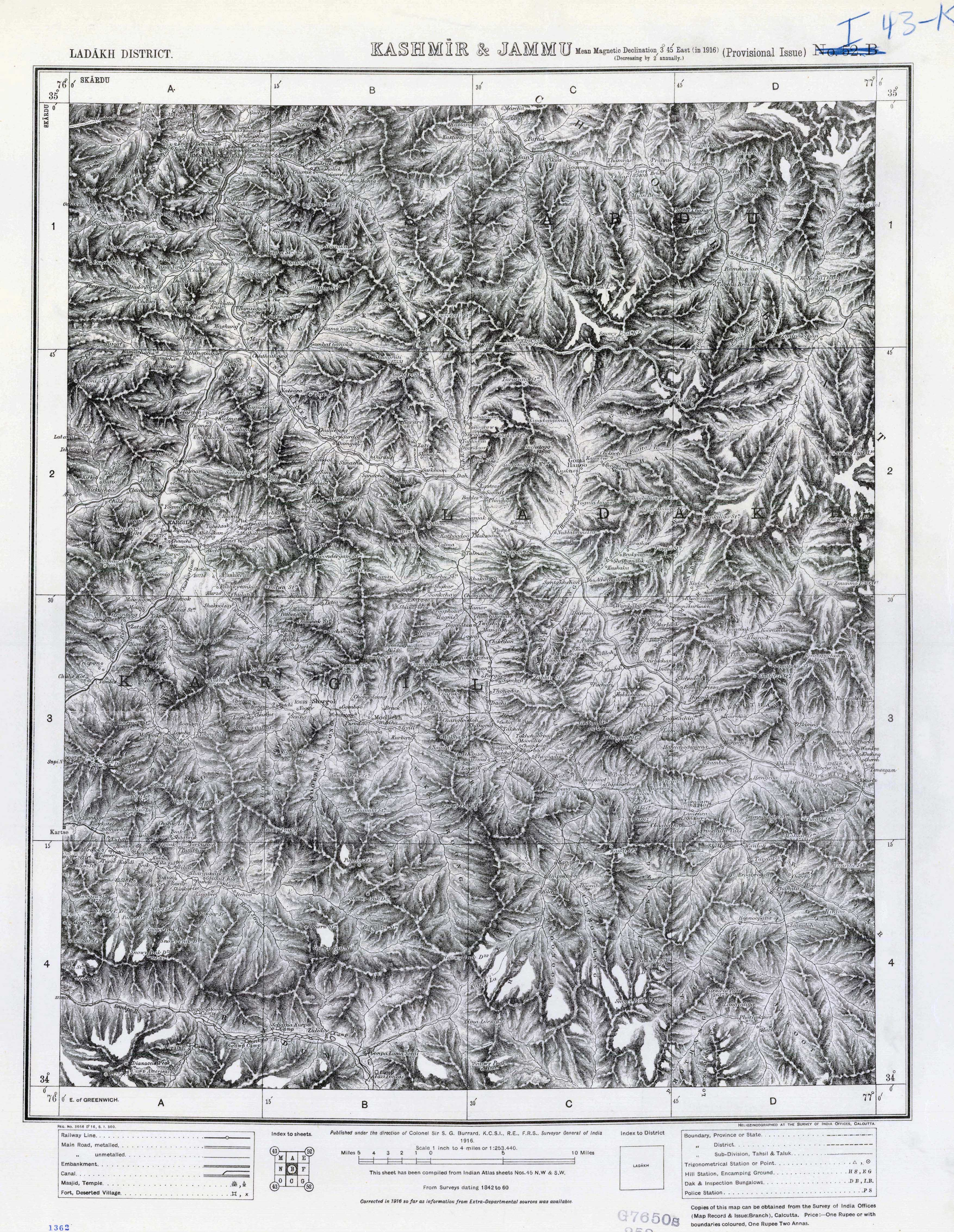
SoI map, 1916

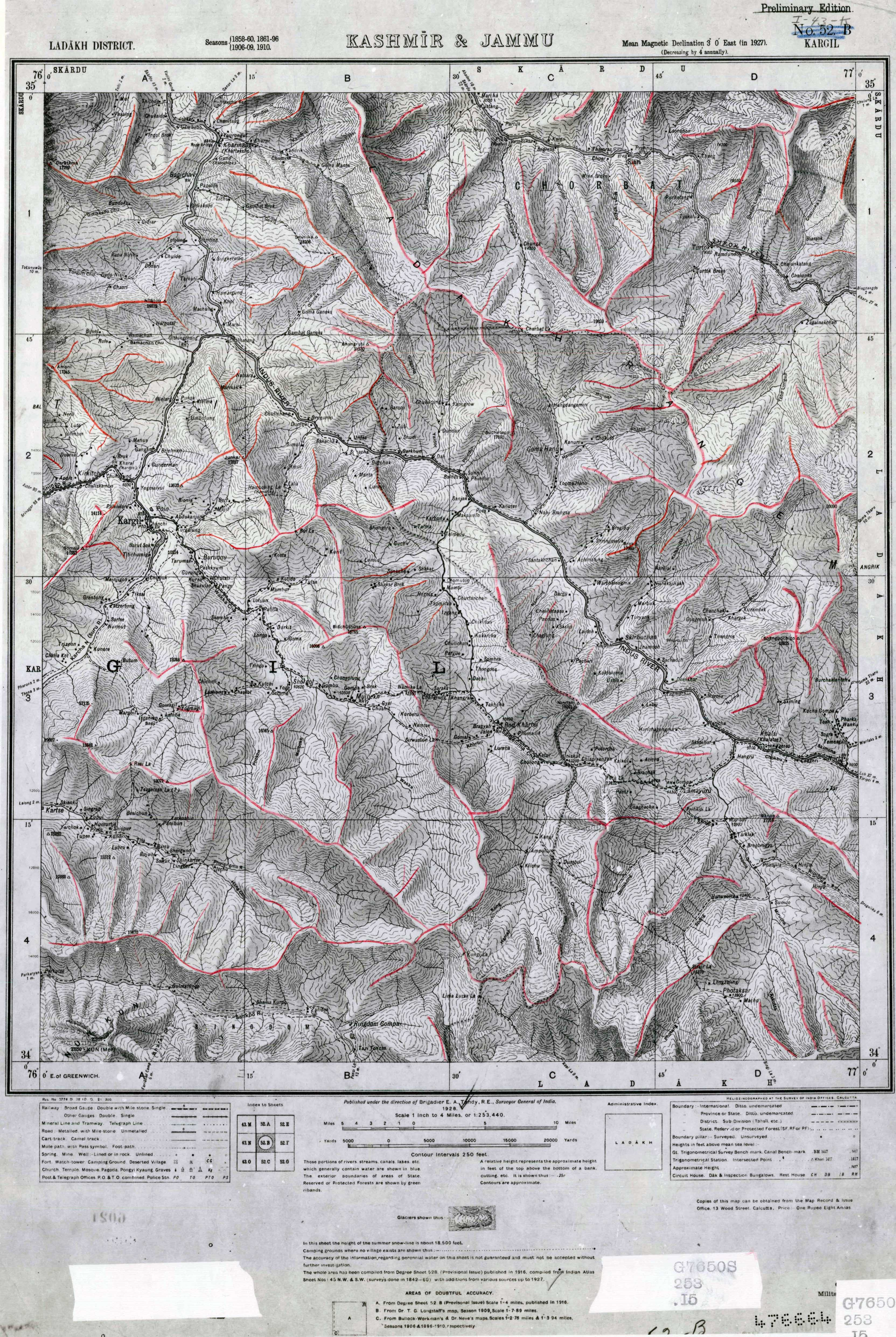
SoI map, 1928

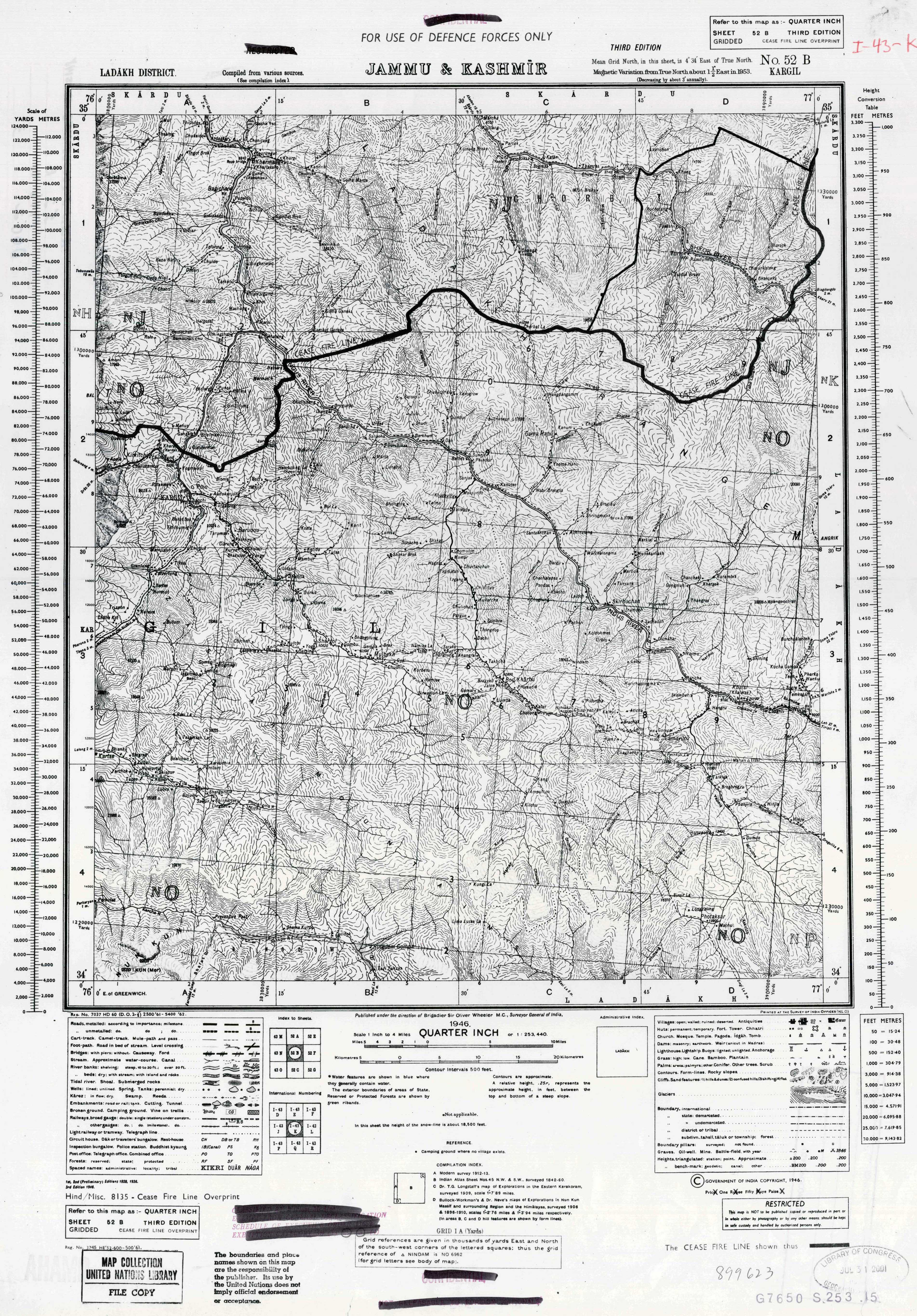
SoI map, 1946, showing the 1948 LoC

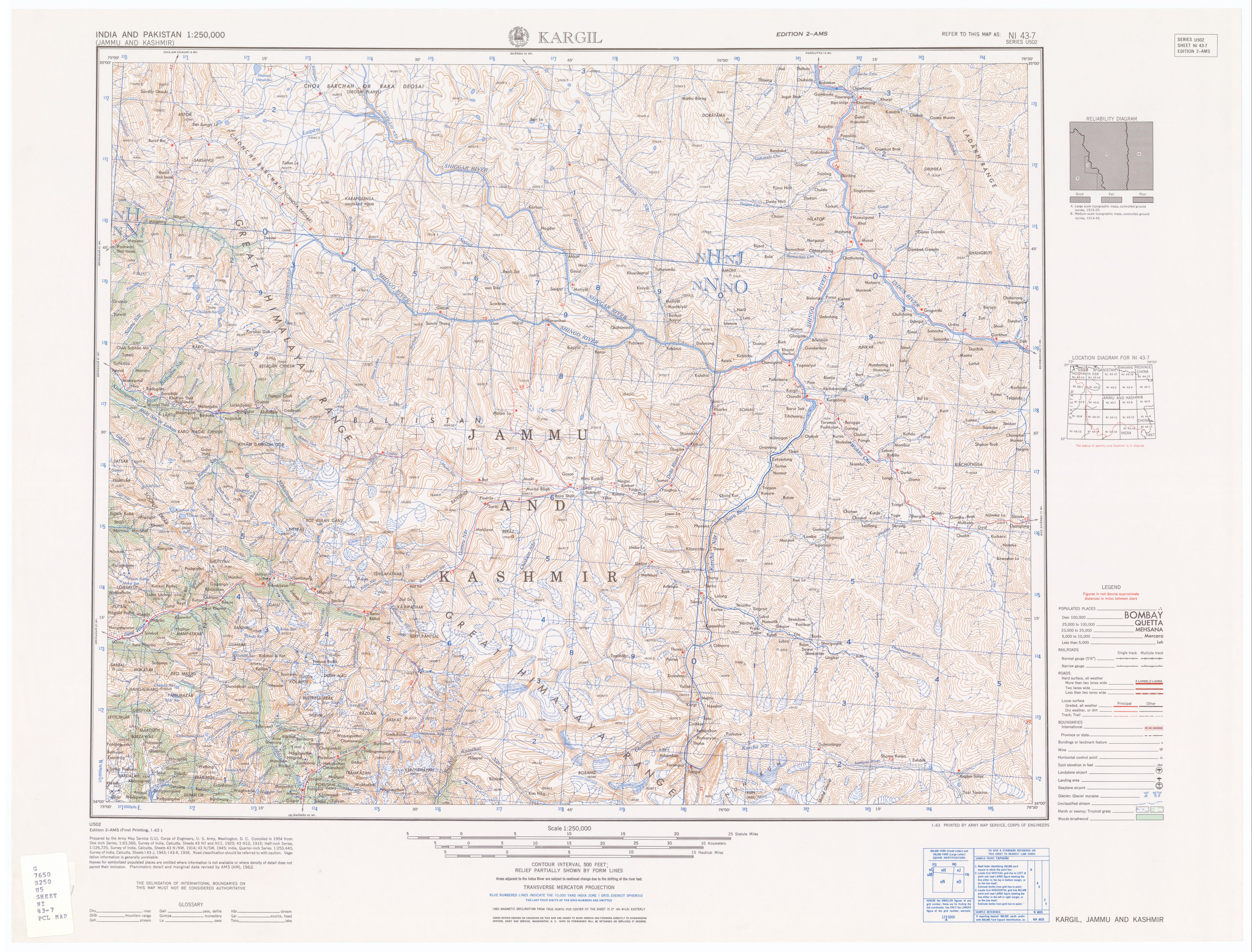
AMS map, 1955

== See also ==
- Aryan Valley
- Olding

== Bibliography ==
- Gazetteer of Kashmir and Ladak, Calcutta: Superintendent of Government Printing, 1890 – via archive.org
- Charak, Sukhdev Singh (1983), General Zorawar Singh, Publications Division, Government of India – via archive.org
