= Batalik =

- Village and military base
- Interactive map of Batalik
- Location in Ladakh, India Batalik (India)
- Coordinates: 34.6558°N 76.3394°E
- Country: India
- Union Territory: Ladakh
- District: Kargil
- Tehsil: Kargil

Languages
  - Official: Hindi, English
- Time zone: UTC+5:30 (IST)
- PIN: 194103

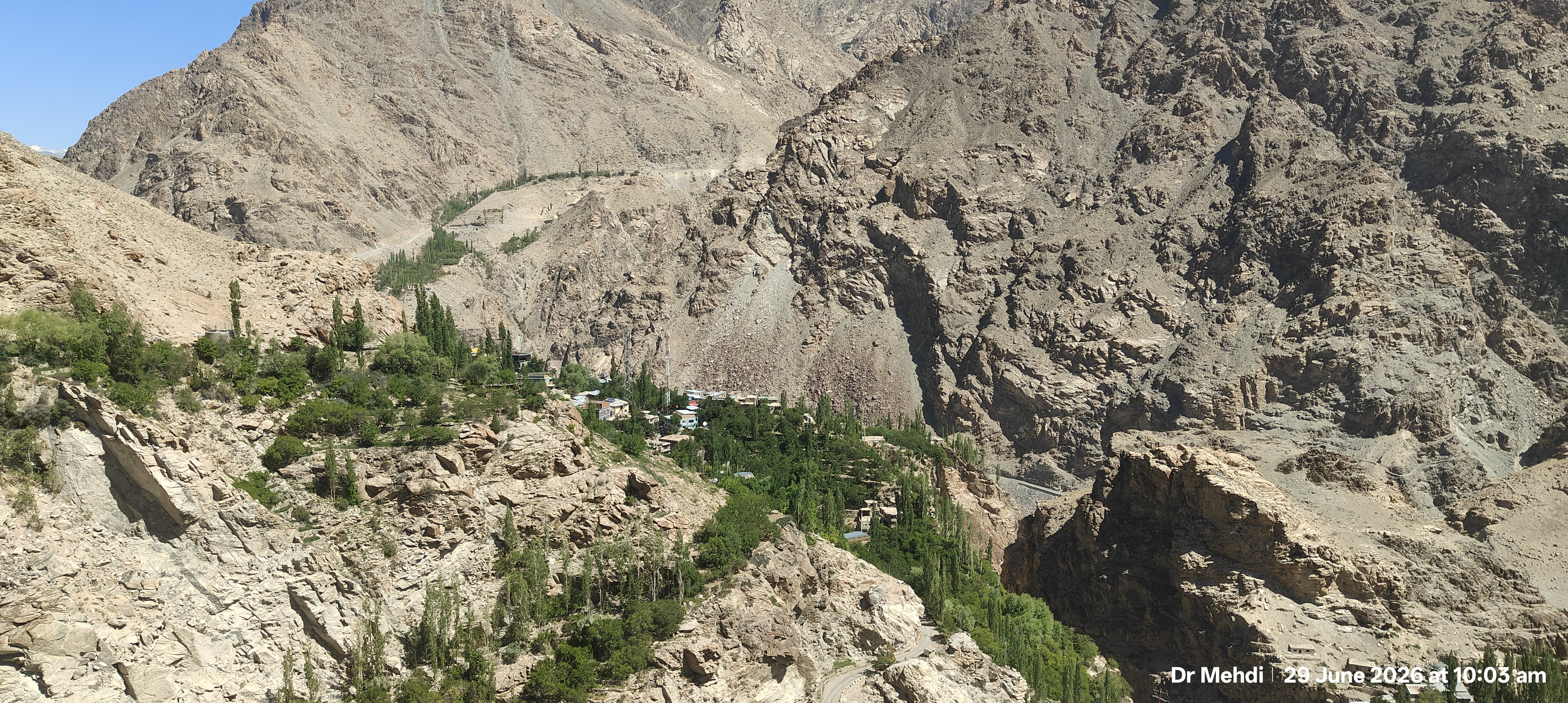
Explore the heroic stories of the 1999 Kargil War in the Batalik sector.

Batalik is a village and military base in Kargil district of Ladakh Union territory in India, located in a narrow section of the Indus River valley in Himalayas, close to the Line of Control with India–Pakistan wars and conflicts|Pakistan-administered Baltistan. Batalik is 56 km northeast of Kargil. Administratively, it is a hamlet of the Silmo village (8 km south of Batalik) patwar, which falls under the Kargil tehsil and Sodh block (44 km south of Batalik).

Batalik is located adjacent to the touristic Dah Hanu region, also known as the "Aryan Valley", populated by the Brokpa people. There is demand to upgrade Batalik and Aryan valley area to a new district.

== History ==
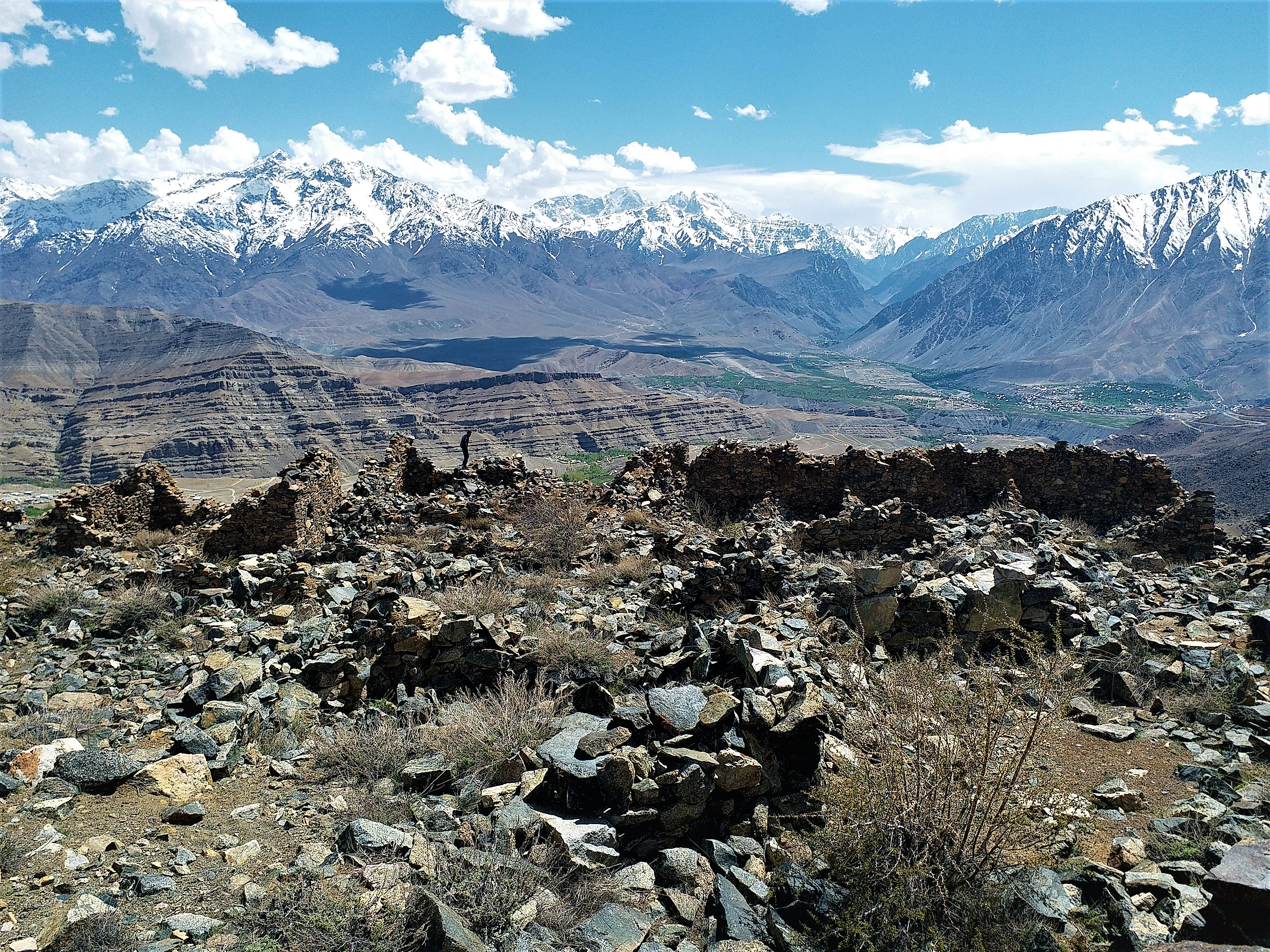
Fort at Sodh, burnt and destroyed during the 19th century Dogra invasion of Ladakh.

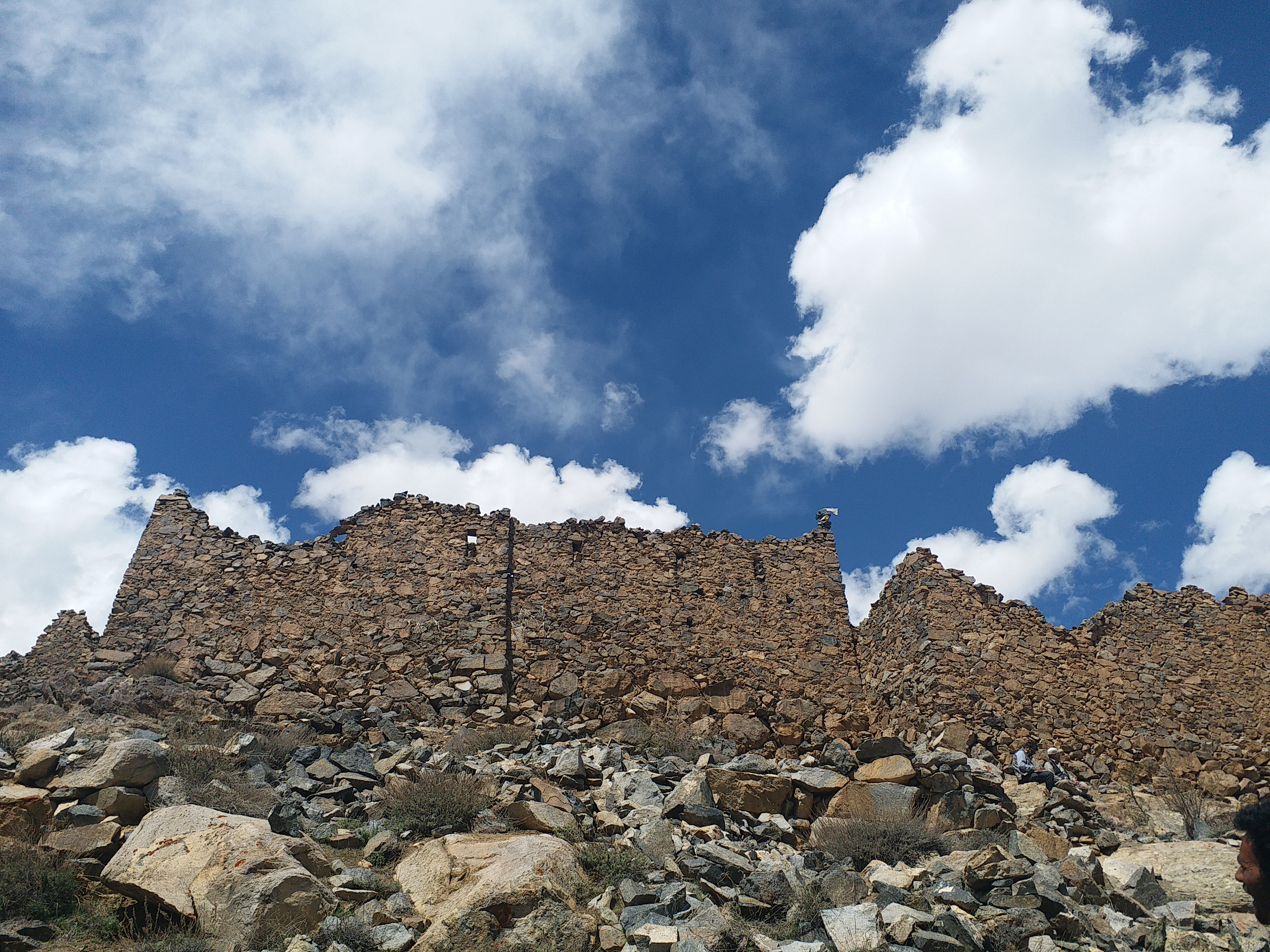
Fort at Sodh, another view of the ruins 44 km south of Batalik.

Historically, Batalik served as a critical junction on the ancient trade routes connecting Ladakh with Baltistan and the Gilgit region along the Indus River with the route through the Hanu Valley and the Chorbat La pass facilitating movement between the two regions. The sector was a primary transit point for salt, wool, and apricots between Ladakh and Baltistan.

Prior to the 1947 partition of India, the Batalik sector was part of the Ladakh Wazarat within the princely state of Jammu and Kashmir, maintaining deep cultural and commercial ties with Skardu. The area was historically part of the Ladakh Wazarat, where the administrative capital alternated between Leh and Skardu, reflecting the deep integration of Batalik into the broader trans-Himalayan commercial network.

In modern history, as a disputed area administered by India and also claimed by Pakistan, it was a focal point of the 1999 Kargil War because of its strategic location between Kargil, Leh and Baltistan. In early May 1999, local shepherds reported the presence of unauthorized armed groups, leading to the discovery of large-scale infiltration by Pakistani forces into the ridgelines overlooking the Indus. The Batalik sector became one of the most difficult theaters of the conflict due to its jagged, high-altitude terrain and its proximity to the Line of Control (LoC). During Operation Vijay, Indian forces engaged in fierce hand-to-hand combat to recapture strategic peaks such as Jubar, Point 5203, and Khalubar, successfully restoring the status quo ante by July 1999. Captain Manoj Kumar Pandey (The Hero of Batalik), was posthumously awarded the Param Vir Chakra, India's highest military decoration, for his "conspicuous bravery and leadership" during the capture of Juber Top and Khalubar in the Batalik sector. As part of the 1/11 Gorkha Rifles, he led a daring daylight assault on a series of enemy bunkers that dominated the narrow valley approach to Batalik.

== Development ==
Development in the Batalik sector has accelerated significantly since 2024, driven by the Union Government's Vibrant Villages Programme (VVP), which aims to improve the quality of life and infrastructure in border areas to mitigate migration.

=== Economy ===
To support the local economy, the administration has established Common Facility Centers (CFCs) for the processing and packaging of high-quality apricots and buckwheat, which are the primary cash crops of the Sod block.

=== Electricity ===
For energy security, the Sod Valley Solar Project was initiated in early 2026, integrating decentralized solar micro-grids to provide 24/7 electricity to remote hamlets, reducing dependency on diesel generators.

=== Telecommunications ===
In early 2025 under the Universal Service Obligation Fund (USOF), the Batalik sector has seen the installation of high-speed public 4G/5G mobile towers with internet connectivity in villages such as Silmo and Garkon, which previously had limited or no cellular coverage.

== Transport ==
=== Road ===
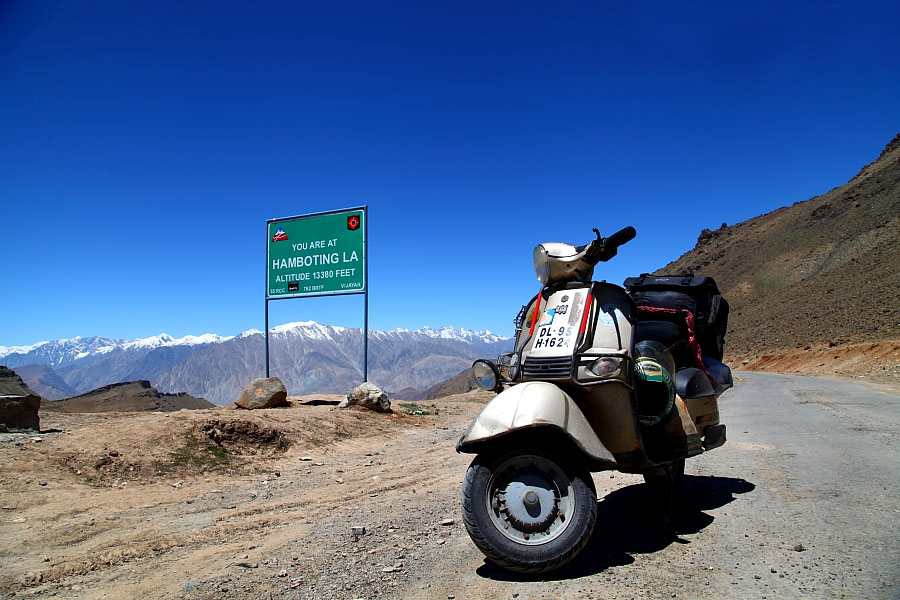
Hamboting La, 22 km southwest of Batalik on Kargil-Batalik Road, for which a road tunnel has been planned.

Travelers typically reach Batalik from Leh or Srinagar via hired taxis or SIDCO and/or JKSRTC buses, with the journey from Leh taking roughly 5–6 hours depending on road conditions near the Hamboting La pass (elevation 4,024 m (13,202 ft)).

Batalik is connected by road to other places in Kargil and Leh via the Kargil–Batalik–Khaltse Road which forms a "detour" from the NH1 between Kargil and Khalatse. Hamboting La Tunnel, to be built by the Border Roads Organisation (BRO) under the Project Vijayak as one of the India–China Border Roads (ICBR) for which DPR (detailed project report) was ready in early 2026, is a planned a strategic road tunnel to bypass the Hamboting La pass to ensure all-weather connectivity on this route. The tunnel, approximately 31 km (19 mi) east of Kargil town between Kargil and Batalik, is designed to circumvent the steep gradients and avalanche-prone hairpin bends of the existing high-altitude pass. The proposed all-weather tunnel under Hamboting La aims to mitigate the strategic vulnerability, as the current pass is directly visible from Pakistani military's Force Command Northern Areas (FCNA) observation posts (especially the Shangruti and Chorbat posts at higher altitude than Hamboting La) in Skardu Sector along the India-Pakistan Line of Control. In 2025, the Border Roads Organization (BRO) completed the widening of the Kargil-Batalik Road and Hamboting La pass section to allow all-weather heavy vehicle movement, significantly reducing travel time for both military logistics and local trade. As of March 2026, BRO has completed the DPR (detailed project report), project is now awaiting funding from the central Ministry of Defence budget to issue construction tenders, after which construction will take nearly 4 years. See also Zoji-la Tunnel, Shinku-la Tunnel and Khardung La Tunnel.

=== Rail ===
The nearest major railway stations to Batalik are Sopore railway station and Srinagar railway station located approximately 271 km (168 mi) and 277 km (172 mi) away respectively via the NH1 and the Batalik–Kargil road. Travelers typically arrive at these stations and proceed by road via the Zoji La pass to reach the Kargil district, or utilize the Udhampur railway station (located approximately 470 km (292 mi) away) for a more established connection to the rest of the Indian Railways network

The proposed Srinagar-Kargil-Leh line, which will also connect to the under-construction Bhanupli–Leh line at Leh, will have a railway station at Kargil.

=== Air ===
Kargil Airport is the nearest airfield, located approximately 60 km (37 mi) from Batalik. As of March 2026, the airport remains primarily a military facility and does not host regular commercial civil flights, although infrastructure upgrades for night landings and runway expansion have been completed to facilitate future regional connectivity. During the winter months (typically December to April), the Indian Air Force (IAF) operates a dedicated AN-32 Kargil Courier Service between Kargil, Srinagar, and Jammu to assist stranded residents and medical emergencies while the Zoji La pass is closed.

For standard commercial travel, the next-nearest major airport is Leh Airport, located at a road distance of approximately 205–216 km (127–134 mi) via the Kargil–Batalik–Khaltse Road.

== Tourism ==
All non-local visitors, including foreign and domestic Indian tourists, are mandatorily required to obtain the valid Inner Line Permit (ILP), obtainable via the official Ladakh administration portal.

Batalik War Memorial and a dedicated "Victory Trail" trek to Khalubar Ridge, aimed at promoting military tourism to educate visitors on the strategic maneuvers of the 1999 conflict and the heroic actions at Khalubar Ridge, has been developed.

Adventure tourism in the region is focused on high-altitude trekking and the Kargil-Batalik-Khaltse cycling circuit, which offers views of the Indus River gorge and the rugged topography of the LoC-adjacent peaks. To support sustainable growth, several Homestay initiatives have been launched in Silmo and Garkon villages, allowing tourists to experience local cuisine and the traditional architecture of the Sod Valley.

Aryan Circuit: The primary attraction in the Batalik sector is the Aryan Circuit, which showcases the unique Indo-Aryan customs, traditional attire, and the harvest festival of Bona-na, celebrated every three years to mark the agricultural cycle. The tourism sector in Batalik and the surrounding Aryan Valley has seen a strategic expansion under the "Vibrant Villages Programme" to promote border tourism while preserving the distinct cultural heritage of the Brokpa community. Foreign and domestic tourists are permitted to visit specific villages including Dah, Hanu, Garkon, and Darchik. The region is inhabited by the Brokpa (or Drokpa) people, an Indo-Aryan ethnolinguistic group believed to be among the earliest settlers of the lower Indus valley, with local oral traditions tracing their lineage to the army of Alexander the Great.

The Batalik sector is the heartland of the Brokpa (or Minaro) people, an Indo-Aryan group that has preserved a distinct Dardic culture and language known as Brokskat for over a millennium. While the inhabitants of Batalik and Silmo villages primarily follow Islam, they share common linguistic and ancestral roots with the Buddhist Brokpas of the neighboring Aryan Valley. A defining feature of the region's cultural calendar is the Bono-na festival, a harvest celebration held to thank local deities for agricultural prosperity. The festival follows a unique three-year rotational cycle between the villages of Dah, Garkon, and Ganokh; significantly, the third year of the cycle is traditionally "skipped" or observed in absentia because Ganokh is located across the Line of Control in Pakistan-administered territory. Other significant local observances include Chhopo Shrubla and Mentog Stanmo, which celebrates the seasonal blooming of apricot blossoms across the valley.

== See also ==
- Yaldor Sub Sector
