= Bono na =

Ancient festival of the Brokpa

Bono-na
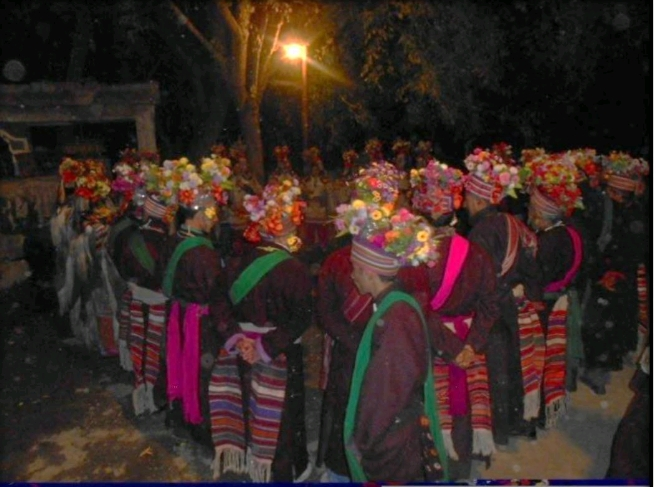
- Last day of Bono-na gathering festival at Garkon
- Official name: Bono-na
- Also called: Chopo Shrubla
- Observed by: Brokpas
- Type: Brokpa, cultural
- Significance: Thanksgiving to the Minaro gods and deities for good crops and prosperity to the community.
- Celebrations: Singing the Hymnal song about Brokpa mythology, cosmology and historical event. Mourn the separation of Minaro from their deities.
- Observances: Gathering of the Brokpa community at Lchangra to listen and celebrate the ancient hymnals of Minaro and worship the ancient deities of Minaro. Traditional folk dance with folk music.
- Date: S October–November.
- Duration: 5 days
- Frequency: Every 2 in 3 years
- Started by: The three extraordinary sons of Angutho, named Galo, Melo, and Dulo. After they have faced an assassination plan from a king of Gilgit. The brothers Galo, Melo and Dulo escaped and settled in Hanoo, Dha and Ganokh, respectively. They decided to have an annual festival hosted alternatively between three brothers, and since then Bono-na has begun.
- Related to: Brokpas

The Bono-na or Bono nah is an ancient festival of the Minaro (Brokpa) people hosted alternatively between Dha and Garkon villages of the Aryan Valley region of Ladakh, India with a gap of a year. It is a festival of thanksgiving to their deities and gods for good crops and prosperity to the people and the land of Minaro.

The festival begins with a man who is Lhaba. The Lhaba dictates the ancestral Hymnal. A Lhaba is descended upon by the spirits of gods who possess him.

The Lhaba meditates for 24 hours on one foot at high hill rock. During those periods of meditation, he eats just three handfuls of barley flour. After the completion of meditation, the villagers assemble around him and sing ballads, perform folk dances and treat him like a god and worship him. He officiates as priest to perform the ancient ritual of the Minaro.

Subsequently, he leads a congregation of worshippers at the appointment festival ground, and the villagers welcome him. They perform a folk dance with joy and sing ballads.

The Hymnal of Bono-na has eighteen songs in the language of the Minaro. The Hymnal of Bono-na is considered holy for two main reasons. First, it contains the last remnant of the Minaro mythology and their cosmology. Secondly, it contains the historical recollection of the Minaro people. This hymnal has illustrated the list of place names of their migration from Gilgit to the present Da hanu region.

== Origin ==
The elders of Dha claimed that their ancestors have originally came from Europe, and settled in Pur Valley, east of Gilgit. The three extraordinary son of Angutho, named Galo, Melo, and Dulo, became wealthy. After they faced an assassination plan from a king of Gilgit, the brothers Galo, Melo and Dulo decided settle in their favourite place. The son of Melo, Thopamaro, and the Dulo decided to stay in Ganokh. The son of Dulo, Gil singe, and the Melo in Nirdha.

Finally Galo and this son settled in Handangsmin. Then they have planned to have a yearly festival hosted alternatively between Ganokh, Nirdah and Hangdangsmin. This festival is known as " Bono-na" festival. They had a Duhiya, a place for their deities, where they sacrifice a goat for them before starting the "Bono-na" festival.
