= Brokpa =

Ethnic group in Ladakh

Minaro
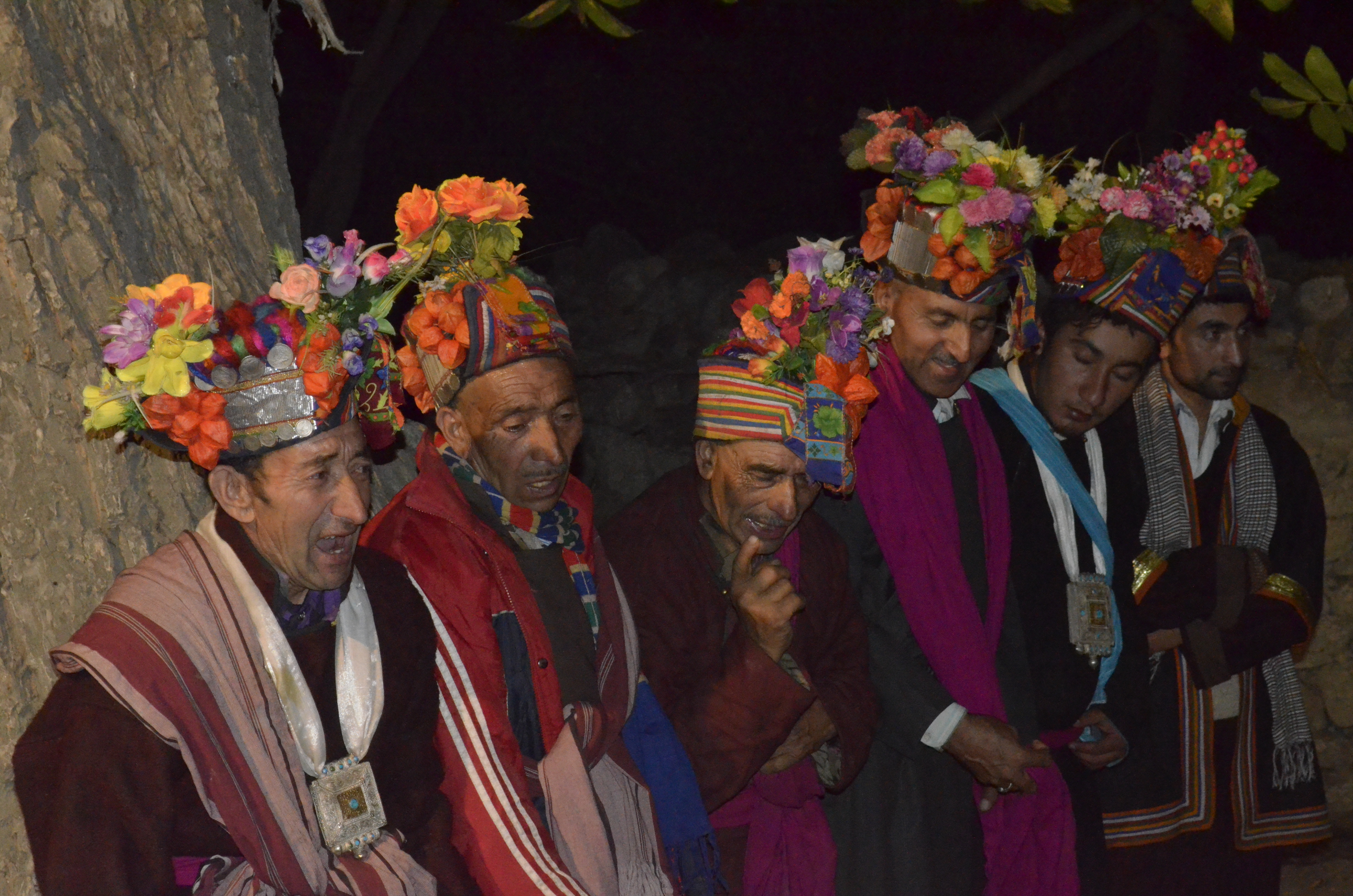
- Brokpa men in Ladakh (Dha-Hanu village), dressed up for Bono na festival

Total population
- 4,000

Regions with significant populations
- Ladakh

Languages
- Brokskat

Religion
- Predominantly: Buddhism; Minority: Islam

Related ethnic groups
- Other Indo-Aryan peoples

The Brokpa (Tibetan: འབྲོག་པ་, Wylie: ’brog pa, THL: drok pa), sometimes called Minaro, is an Indo-Aryan ethnolinguistic group mostly found in the Indian-administered union territory of Ladakh around the villages of Dha and Hanu. Some of the community is also across the Line of Control in the Pakistan-administered Baltistan, in the villages around Ganokh. They speak an Indo-Aryan language called Brokskat. The Brokpa are mostly Vajrayana Buddhist but some are Muslim.

== Name ==
According to the British Raj commentators, the Baltis gave the name "Brogpa" to the Dardic people living among them. The term means "highlander"; the Brogpa tended to occupy the higher pasture lands in the valleys. Frederic Drew states, "Wherever the Dards are in contact with Baltis or with Bhots, these others call them (...) Brokpa or Blokpa." As Tibetan language pronunciation varies by region, the same name is pronounced by Ladakhis as Drokpa or Dokpa. (Note: Many pastoral groups on the Tibetan plateau and the surrounding Himalayan regions have been given the name Brogpa/Drokpa. They are not necessarily related to each other.)

Over time, the term "Brokpa" fell out of use in Baltistan and the Drass area in favour of ethnic labels such as "Dards" and "Shins". Only the Brokpa of the lower Indus valley in Ladakh Dah Hanu region retain the name, and their language is called Brokskat. They use the endonym "Minaro".

== Identity and geographic distribution ==
The Brokpa speak the Indo-Aryan language Brokskat, a variant of the Shina language spoken in the Gilgit region. (During the British Raj, it became common to refer to the people of the Gilgit region as "Dards" using ancient nomenclature. The Brokpa are thus "Dards" living in the midst of Tibetic Ladakhi and Balti people.) (Note: In current parlance, the term "Dards" is used for the speakers of Dardic languages. The Brokpa are "Dards" on this account as well.) While the two languages share similar phonological developments, Brokskat converged with Purgi to the extent of being mutually intelligible.

The Brokpa might have expanded from the Gilgit region upstream along the Indus valley until reaching their current habitat, viz., the lower Indus valley of Ladakh next to the border with Baltistan. The time frame of this expansion or dispersion is uncertain, but their chiefs are believed to have ruled at Khalatse until the 12th century, where the remnants of their forts can still be found. Their rule over this region ended during the reign of the Ladakhi kings Lhachen Utpala and his successor Lhachen Naglug.

Another group of Brokpa appear to have settled in the Turtuk region in the lower Shyok river valley, where remnants of their fort can be found. They appear to have faced a defeat at the hands of raiders from Baltistan, and moved to the Hanu valley below the Chorbat La pass.

According to scholar Rohit Vohra, the Brokpa can be found all along the Indus Valley from Leh, but Achina-Thang is the first wholly Brokpa village. They adopted Ladakhi culture a long ago. Their major villages are, in addition to Dah and Hanu, Garkon, Darchik, and Batalik. A few of them live in the villages of Silmo (34.627°N 76.320°E) and Lalung (34.591°N 76.298°E) en route to Kargil. In the 17th century, the stream and village of Gurugurdo (34.661°N 76.333°E) was set as the border between Baltistan and Ladakh. To the north are Muslim Brokpa villages such as Chulichan, Ganokh, and possibly Marol. Ganokh and Marol are at present in Pakistan-administered Gilgit-Baltistan.

The number of Brokstat speakers was estimated as 3,000 people in 1996.

== Festivals ==
Brokpa celebrate Bono-na, a festival of thanksgiving to deities for good crops and prosperity.

== Diet ==
The traditional Brogpa diet is based on locally grown foods such as barley and hardy wheat prepared most often as tsampa/sattu (roasted flour). Other important foods include potatoes, radishes, turnips, and Gur-Gur Cha, a brewed tea made of black tea, butter, and salt.

Dairy and poultry sources are not eaten because of religious taboos. Brogpa eat three meals a day: Choalu Unis (breakfast), Beali (lunch) and Rata Unis (dinner). Brogpa vary with respect to the amount of meat (mainly mutton) they eat. A household's economic position decides the consumption of meat. It is only during festivals and rituals that all have greater access to mutton.

== Economy and employment ==
The Brogpa economy has shifted from agropastoralism to wage labour, and the division of labour that relied on stratifications of age and gender is now obsolete. For many years, Brokpa predominantly engaged in high-altitude grazing (3000 to 4500 meter) and lowland agriculture. Their transition to private property, monogamy, nuclear families, formal education, wage labour, and their incorporation into a highly militarised economy of soldiering and portering illuminates the complex workings of modernity in Ladakh.

== See also ==
- Shina people
- Nuristani people
- Kalash people
- Hunza people
- Gurjar people

== Bibliography ==
- Gazetteer of Kashmir and Ladak, Calcutta: Superintendent of Government Printing, 1890 – via archive.org
- Bhasin, Veena (2004). "Tribals of Ladakh: Ecology and Health". In Aloke Kumar Kalla; P. C. Joshi (eds.). Tribal Health and Medicines. Concept Publishing Company. pp. 131–. ISBN 9788180691393. OCLC 1046388551.
- Cardona, George; Jain, Danesh (2007). The Indo-Aryan Languages. Routledge. ISBN 978-1-135-79711-9.
- Drew, Frederic (1875), The Jummoo and Kashmir Territories: A Geographical Account, E. Stanford – via archive.org
- Jina, Prem Singh (1996), Ladakh: The Land and the People, Indus Publishing, ISBN 978-81-7387-057-6
- Kogan, Anton (2019), "On possible Dardic and Burushaski influence on some Northwestern Tibetan dialects", Journal of Language Relationship, 17 (4): 263–284, doi:10.31826/jlr-2019-173-409, S2CID 215770214
- Radloff, Carla F. (1992), "The Dialects of Shina" (PDF), in Peter C. Backstrom; Carla F. Radloff (eds.), Languages of Northern Areas, Sociolinguistic Survey of Northern Pakistan, vol. 2, National Institute of Pakistan Studies, Quaid-i-Azam University & Summer Institute of Linguistics, pp. 89–203, ISBN 969-8023-12-7
- Schmidt, Ruth Laila (2004), "A grammatical comparison of Shina dialects", in Anju Saxena (ed.), Himalayan Languages: Past and Present, Walter de Gruyter, pp. 33–, ISBN 978-3-11-017841-8
- Vohra, Rohit (1982), "Ethnographic Notes on the Buddhist Dards of Ladakh: The Brog-Pā", Zeitschrift für Ethnologie, 107 (1): 69–94, JSTOR 25841799
