= Ganokh =

Ganokh Ganisha Ganoks
- Village
- Interactive map of Ganokh
- Location within Gilgit Baltistan Location within Kashmir Location within Pakistan
- Coordinates: 34°45′23″N 76°18′28″E
- Country: Pakistan
- Province: Gilgit-Baltistan
- District: Kharmang
- Tehsil: Kharmang
- Union Council: Hamzigond
- Time zone: UTC+5 (PST)
  - Summer (DST): GMT+5

Ganokh, (Note: Alternative spellings: Ganok and Ganoks) (Wylie: ga nog) locally called Ganishah, is a village in the Kharmang District of Baltistan, Pakistan, close to the Line of Control with Indian-administered Ladakh. It is populated by Brokpas professing Shia Islam.

== Geography ==
The village of Ganokh consists of two census settlements, Gamba Ganokh and Goma Ganokh. Both lie in the valley of the Ganokh Nala, a tributary of the Indus River. The Line of Control (LOC) with Indian-administered Kashmir (Ladakh) run south of the valley, about 2 kilometres (1.2 mi) along the Indus, on a ridge line that forms the watershed between the Ganokh Nala and the Ghargurdo and Yaldor Nalas on the other. (Note: Alternative spellings: Gurgurdo, Gurugurdo.) It continues on to the Chorbat La pass.

== Demographics ==
Ganokh is populated by Brokpas professing Shia Islam. According to a 2022 news report, it is the only village in Pakistan where the Brokskat language is spoken.

== History ==
Historically, Ganokh and the adjacent regions were populated by Brokpa people. Folklore maintains that they arrived there from the Gilgit region through the Gavis valley (to the north of the Ganokh valley) and colonised Ganokh, Yaldor, and Hanu before spreading to Dha. Their chieftains wielded significant autonomy in the region, pledging nominal allegiance to the Maqpon rulers of Skardu.

However, things changed in the seventeenth century when Jamyang Namgyal of Ladakh faced a conflict with Ali Sher Khan Anchan of Skardu and had to accept Gurgurdho as a boundary between their territories. Consequently, Ganokh was integrated into Baltistan and became influenced by Shia Islam. Nevertheless, the local Brokpas continued to maintain marital relations with their ethnic kin in the Dah Hanu region of Ladakh; cross-border trade also occurred, with the village serving as a tax collection post.

Family connections ceased when the latter accepted Buddhism in c. late nineteenth century. In the aftermath of the First Kashmir War (1947–1948), Ganokh fell in Pakistan and became permanently inaccessible for Dah-Hanu Brokpas. During the 1999 Kargil War, the Ganokh valley provided a key infiltration route for Pakistani forces, through which they accessed the Dah-Hanu region. The ensuing shelling and fighting caused much loss of life and property in Ganokh; many had to be evacuated and remain internally displaced even two decades after the war.

== See also ==
- Chulichan
- Garkon
- Darchik
- Hanoo

== Bibliography ==
- Gazetteer of Kashmir and Ladak, Calcutta: Superintendent of Government Printing, 1890 – via archive.org
- Bhan, Mona (2006), Visible Margins: State, Identity, and Development among Brogpas of Ladakh (India), Rutgers University, ProQuest 305292033
- Nicolaus, Peter (October 2015). "Residues of Ancient Beliefs among the Shin in the Gilgit-Division and Western Ladakh". Iran and the Caucasus. 19 (3): 201–264. doi:10.1163/1573384X-20150302. ISSN 1573-384X – via researchgate.net.
- Vohra, Rohit (1982), "Ethnographic Notes on the Buddhist Dards of Ladakh: The Brog-Pā", Zeitschrift für Ethnologie, 107 (1): 69–94, JSTOR 25841799
