= Garkon =

Garkone Garkon
- village
- Location in Ladakh, India Garkone (India)
- Coordinates: 34.634905°N 76.432720°E
- Country: India
- Union Territory: Ladakh
- District: Sham
- Tehsil: Aryan valley

Area
  - Total: 202.7 ha (501 acres)

Population (2011)
  - Total: 1,287
  - Density: 634.9/km^{2} (1,644/sq mi)
- Time zone: UTC+5:30 (IST)
- PIN: 194103

Garkon (Alternative spellings: Garkone, Garkhon, Garkun, Garkhun, and Garkhono.) (Wylie: gar ku nu) is a Panchayat village located on the Bank of Indus river in the Aryan valley tehsil of Sham district in Ladakh, India.

== Geography ==
The village is located on the right bank of the Indus River below Dah. It is at an altitude of 2748 meters. It has six hamlets: Changra, Fantola, Haroo, Rama, Sirchangarh, and Thamtse. It also includes a hamlet named Gurgurdo, which lies five miles west of Garkone.

The stream descending from the adjoining mountains (called Baroro stream or Garkon Nala) provides water to its fields for agriculture, and drains into the Indus. The stream is neighboured by the Gurgurdo stream in the west, which drains into the Indus at Batalik, and the Yaldor stream to the east, which joins the Indus at Dah. All three streams are accessible from the Ganokh valley to the north, by crossing mountain passes.

The village is very close to the line of control (LOC) with Pakistan-administered Baltistan (in Gilgit-Baltistan), which runs along the ridge separating the Ganokh valley with Gurgurdo, Ganokh and Yaldor valleys. Garkon, Hordas, and Batalik on the Indian side and Marol on the Pakistani side are important villages along the Indus from east to west. Gurgurdo, Garkhon, and Yaldor were focal points in the Kargil War because of their strategic location.

These villages grow apples, apricots, mulberries, and grapes. Apricot trees in particular are prevalent as in most of Ladakh, as the trees are long-lived and drought-resistant, and usually do not require irrigation, fertiliser or pesticides.

== History ==
At Gurgurdo, the border between Ladakh and Baltistan was set up in the 17th century followed by the battle between the kingdom of Ali Sher Khan Anchan and Gyalpo Jamyang Namgyal. It has a sequence of seven strategically placed watchtowers, now in ruins, which previously guarded the frontier.

After the Dogra general Zorawar Singh annexed Ladakh and Baltistan, Garkon was placed in the Kargil ilaqa (subdistrict), along with Darchik and Sanacha. Gurgurdo and other northern villages remained in the Kharmang ilaqa under the administration of its traditional raja.

Shepherds from Garkon were the first to note and report the intrusion of armed Pakistani men in the 1990s, plus they were instrumental in alerting the Indian Army personnel of the Pakistani raids, which started the Kargil War in 1999.

The presence of the Indian Army along the nearby line of control has greatly affected the traditional way of life in Garkon. For example, villagers own fewer goats due to military occupation of the high alpine summer pastures, but more donkeys; the men of the work as porters for the army, hauling supplies up to the border posts, and sometimes bringing bodies back down

== Administration ==
Garkon is the headquarters of a gram panchayat in the Sham district, which administers Garkon and some villages.

== Demographics ==
According to the 2011 census of India, Garkone has 242 households. The effective literacy rate is 60.31%.

Demographics (2011 Census)
	Total	Male	Female
Population	1287	662	625
Children aged below 6 years	206	109	97
Scheduled caste	0	0	0
Scheduled tribe	1264	650	614

== Maps ==
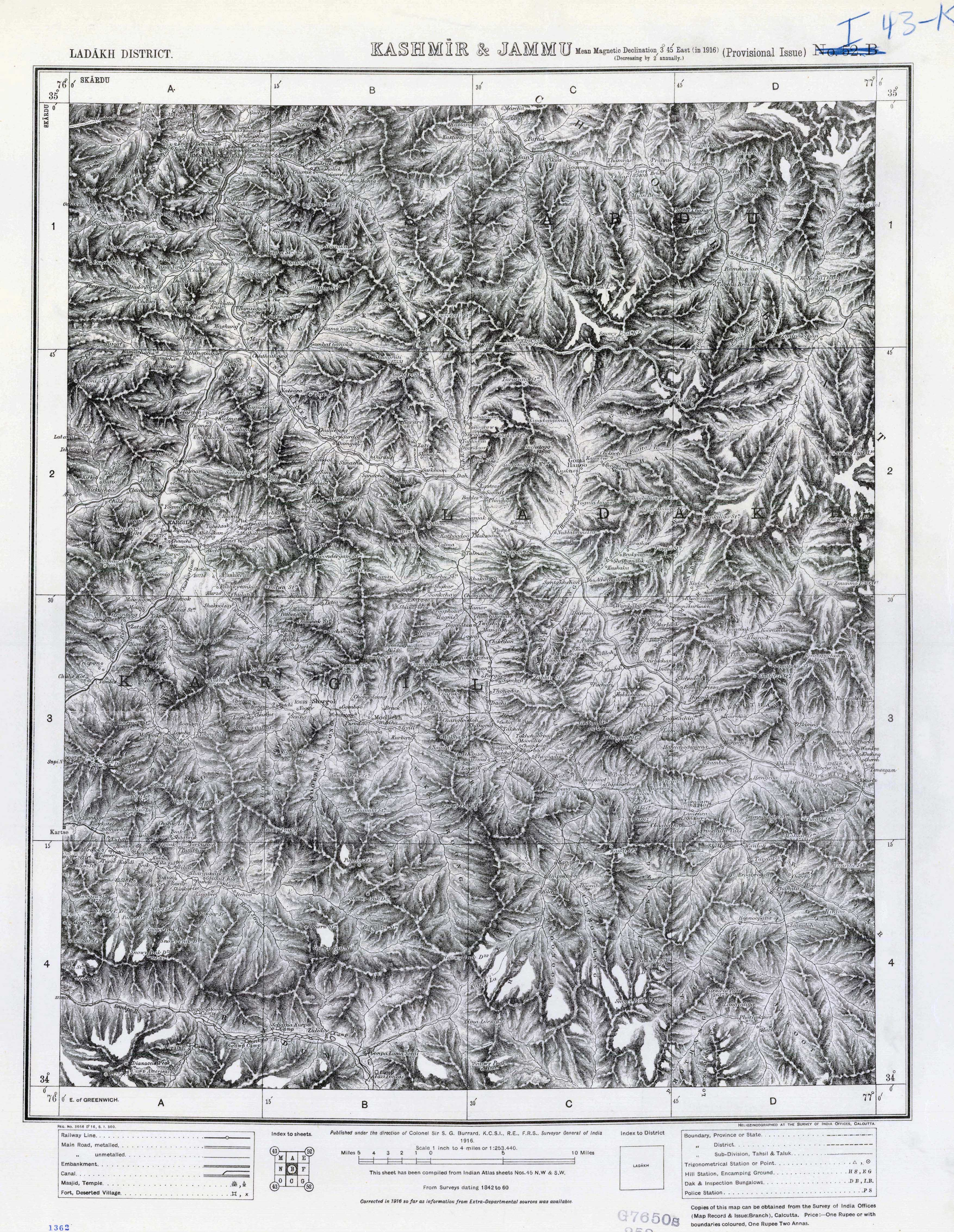
SoI map, 1916

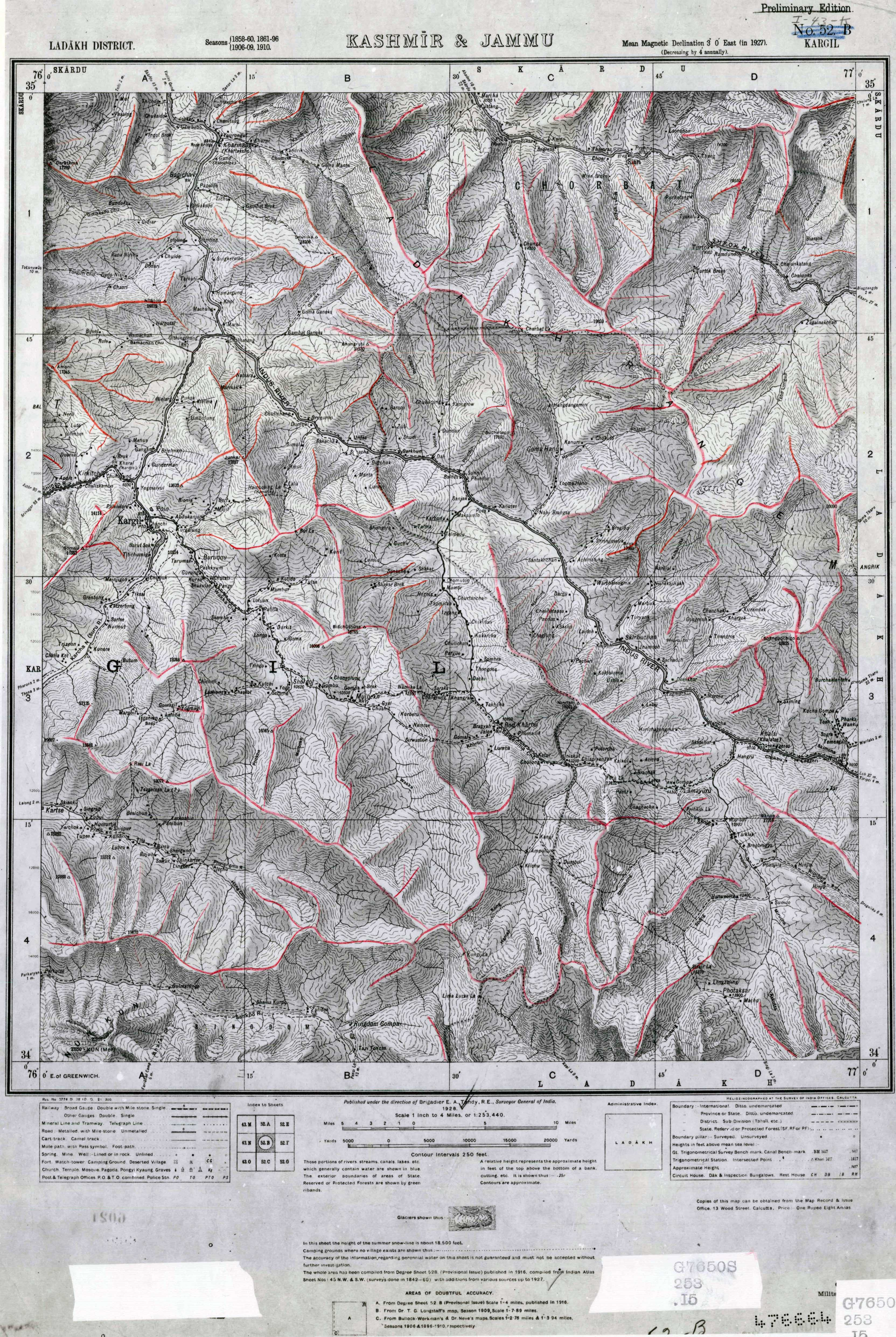
SoI map, 1928

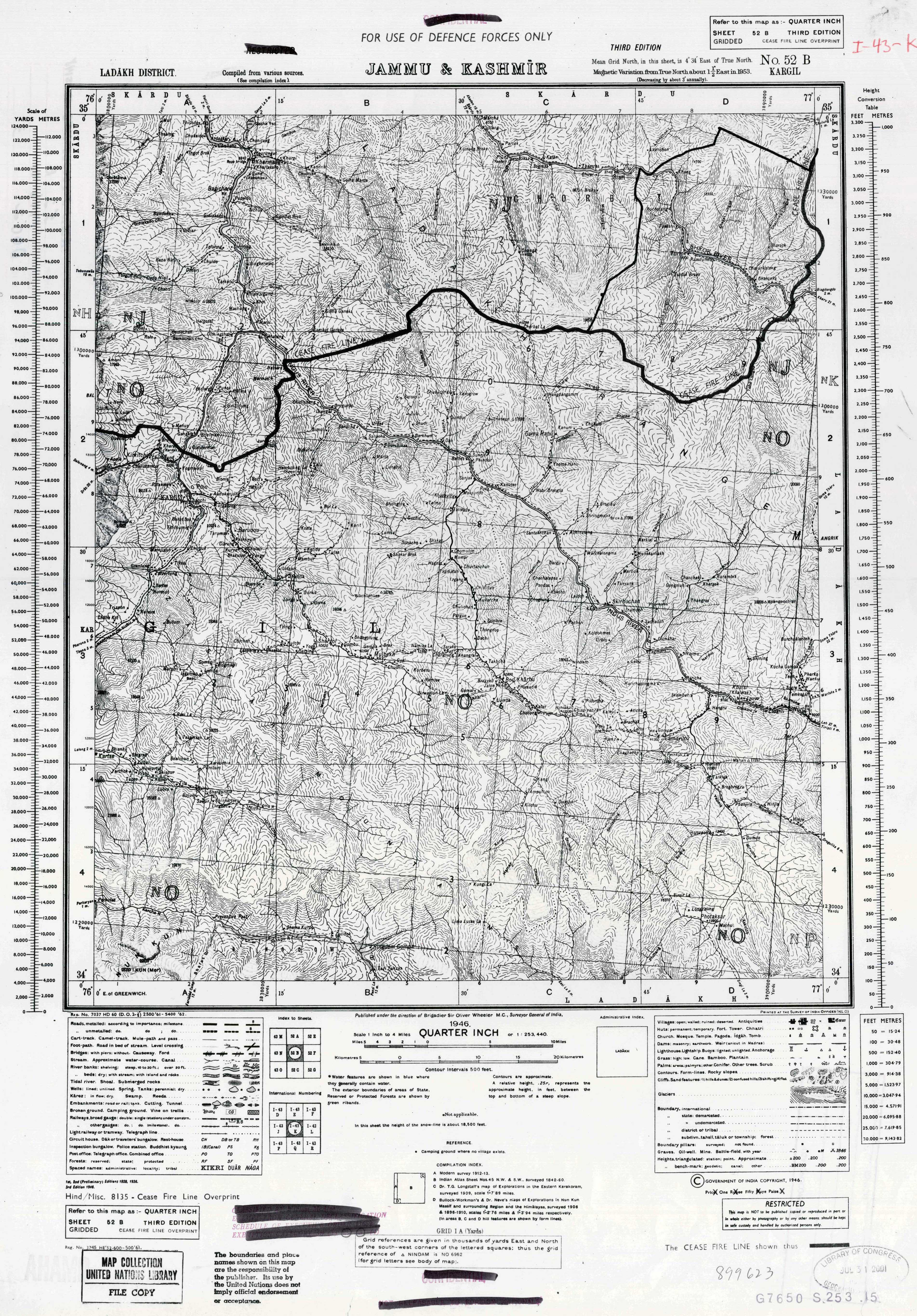
SoI map, 1946, showing the 1948 LoC

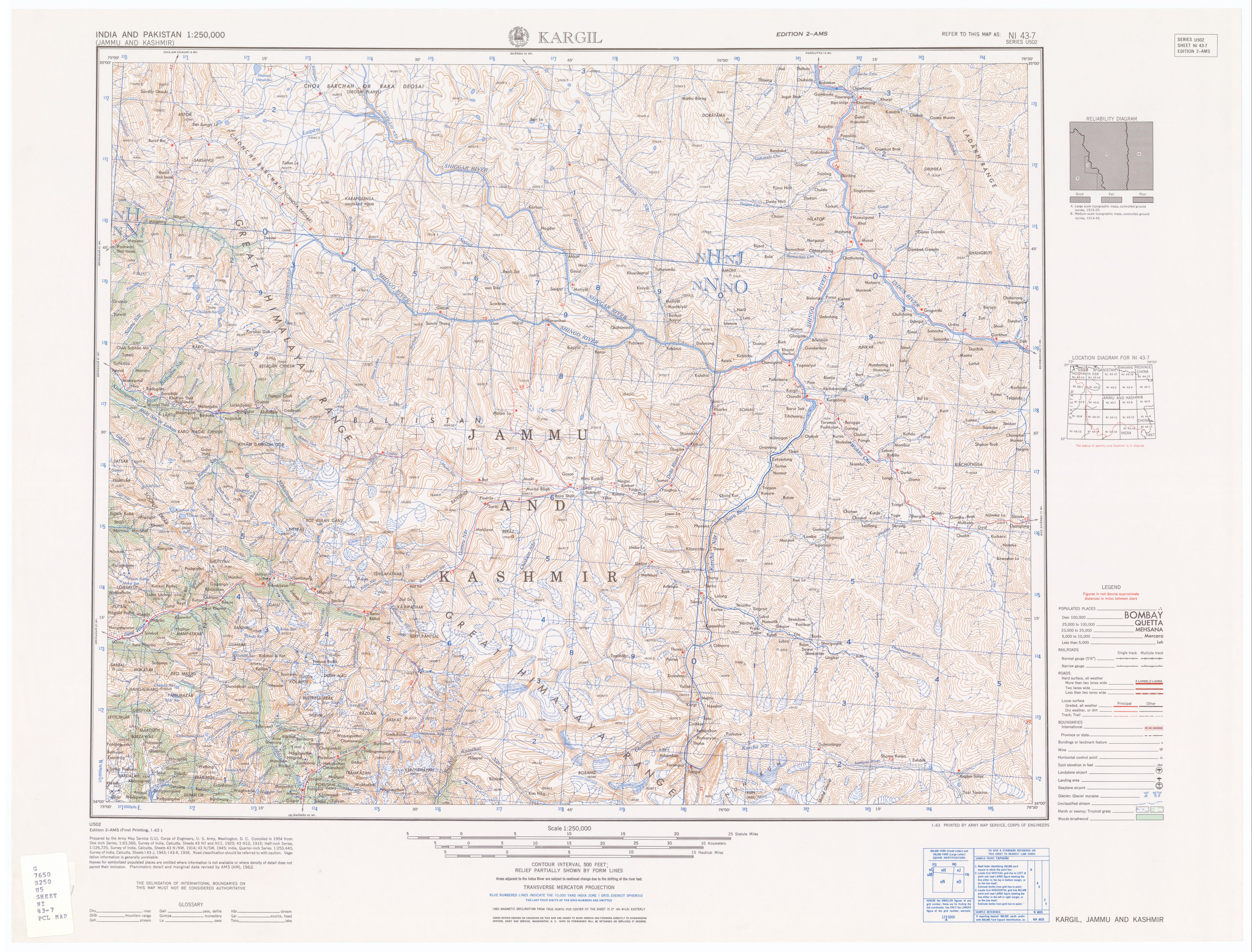
AMS map, 1955

== See also ==
- Geography of Ladakh
- Tourism in Ladakh
