= Mona Bhan =

Indian cultural anthropologist

Academic background
- Education: Rutgers University (PhD)
- Thesis: Visible margins: State, identity, and development among Brogpas of Ladakh (India) (2006)
- Doctoral advisor: Dorothy L. Hodgson

Academic work
- Discipline: Anthropology
- Sub-discipline: Border wars and counterinsurgency; militarism and humanitarianism; occupation and human rights; space and place
- Institutions: Syracuse University; DePauw University
- Website: Maxwell Profile

Mona Bhan is the Ford-Maxwell Professor of South Asian Studies and associate professor of Anthropology at the Maxwell School of Citizenship and Public Affairs of Syracuse University. At Maxwell school, she is the senior research associate at the South Asia Center and serves as the director of the Moynihan Institute of Global Affairs.

Her extensive research work on Ladakh on questions of identity, development, militarization, and counterinsurgency has been published in numerous journals such as the Journal of Asian Studies, Sociological Bulletin, Contemporary South Asia, and Cultural Anthropology. Her book on Ladakh entitled Counterinsurgency, Democracy and the Politics of Identity in India: From Warfare to Welfare? was published by Routledge in September 2013. She has also conducted ethnographic fieldwork in Kashmir, focusing on the relationship between violence, counterinsurgency, and environmental activism. Her current project examines the politics and contestations over water between India and Pakistan.

She previously worked at DePauw University, teaching courses on Wars and Militarism, Anthropology of Development, Ethnography of Gender in South Asia, Cosmopolitanism, and Environmental Anthropology.

== Works ==
Some of her publications are:

=== Books ===
- Counterinsurgency, Democracy, and the Politics of Identity in India: From Warfare to Welfare? (London, New York: Routledge, 2013)

=== Articles ===
- “Aryan Valley” and the Politics of Race and Religion in Kashmir"
- "Refiguring Rights, Redefining Culture: Hill-Councils in Kargil, Jammu & Kashmir". Special Journal Issue on "Development of Democratic Routes in the Himalayan 'Borderlands, In Sociological Bulletin 59 (1), 2009. 71-93 (Reprinted in Routeing Democracy in the Himalayas: Experiments and Experiences, eds. Vibha Arora and N. Jayaram, Routledge, India. 2013)
- "Disarming Violence: Democracy, Development, and the Security on the borders of India", in Journal of Asian Studies, 68, 2009, 519–542.
- "Border Practices: Labor and Nationalism among Brogpas of Ladakh". in Contemporary South Asia, 16 (2), (June, 2008), 139–157.

=== Other publications ===
- "Rethinking Ethics" In AnthroNews, December 2007. pp. 48–49
- "Fluid Landscapes: The Politics of Conservation and Dislocation" in Greater Kashmir, June 28, 2009 (With Nishita Trisal)
- "Military Masculinities" 2006. In Men of the Global South: A Reader, edited by Adam Jones. London: Zed Books. pp 269–271 (Republished in Recent Research on Ladakh, Papers from the 12th Colloquium of the International Association for Ladakh Studies, 2009).

=== Book Reviews by Mona Bhan ===
- Review of Role and Image of Law in India: The Tribal Experience. Vasudha Dhagamvar. Sage Publications, 2006. In PoLAR: Political and Legal Anthropology Review 32 (2), (November, 2008) 344–349.
- Review of Newsrooms in Conflict: Journalism and Democratization of Mexico. Sallie Hughes. University of Pittsburgh Press, 2006. In The Latin Americanist, 52 (2): 2008, 100-103

=== Interviews ===
- OPEN, 2011
- Outside Islamabad 2011
- Tribune India 2004
- The Aryan Saga, A documentary 2006.

=== Audio/Video ===
- After 1948: Realignments in Politics and Culture
- Grounding Kashmir: Public Culture and Sentiment
