= Aryan Valley =

Historical and cultural region and tehsil in Ladakh, India

Aryan Valley Dah Hanu region (Note: Dah Hanu: Shaw 1878, p. 27: "I paid visit to the Dha Hanu district (the home of these so called Buddhist Dards on my way down to India from Ladak (western Tibet) last winter (1876)."; Indira Gandhi National Centre for the Arts: "Dha-Hanu is a remote area consisting of four major villages and small hamlets situated on both sides of the banks of Sindhu (River Indus). The four major villages are known as Dha, Hanu, Garkhan and Darchik.; Bray 2008, p. 46: "A 16 century dispute over King Tsewang Namgyal's authority in the Dha-Hanu region illustrates how the hierarchies could be both extended and contested. The king summoned the people of Hanu, who until then had been closer to the Maqpon (ruler) of Skardu, to assist in the construction of a road.")
- Historical and cultural region; Tehsil
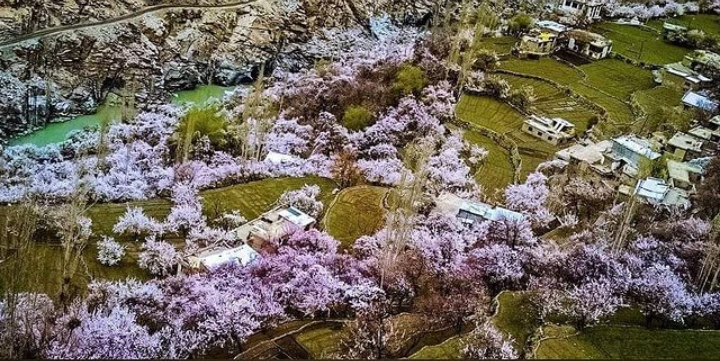
- Aryan Valley in Ladakh, India

- Location in Ladakh, India Aryan Valley (India)
- Coordinates: 34.60°N 76.51°E
- Country: india
- Union Territory: Ladakh
- District: Sham
- Incorporated as Tehsil: 16 October 2026
- Headquarters: Dha Bema
- Highest elevation: 3,000 m (10,000 ft)
- Lowest elevation: 2,700 m (9,000 ft)

Spoken
  - Languages: Brokskat

Ethnicity
  - Ethnic group: Brokpa (Minaro)
- Time zone: UTC+05:30 (IST)

Aryan Valley, historically known as Dah-Hanu region, is a historical, cultural, and geographical region in Ladakh, India, comprising four revenue village clusters — Dah , Hanu, Garkon and Darchik along with their associated hamlets. The region is administratively designated as a tehsil in Sham district with its headquarters at Dha Bema. It is inhabited by Brokpa ethnolinguistic people of Dard origin. (Note: A. Divya (2019-02-08) The Dard Aryans of Ladakh: who are this tribe, what are their concerns?, The Indian Express: "Some 200 km from Leh are the villages of Dha, Hanu, Garkone and Darchik on both sides of the Indus River, inhabited by the Buddhist Dard tribes. The villages are together called the “Aryan valley.”") (Note: Sharma 1998, p. 1: "In Tibetan (Ladakhi), it is called 'Brog-yul', a hilly mountainous region (Brog-- Hill +yul-- country). It is a land of narrow ravine and valleys south of Hindukush - Karakoram range forming the part of central Ladakh. The prominent inhabited localities of these land are DaH, Hanu, Darchiks, and Garkhone.") Until the early 17 century, the Dard Chief of Aryan valley maintained their independence from both ladakh and Baltistan, recognizing only the nominal suzerainty of Skardu Raja.

The current name originated in the tourism industry c. 2010 to market the Brokpas, the local inhabitants, as being the primordial Aryans. (Note: Mona Bhan, “Aryan Valley” and the Politics of Race and Religion in Kashmir, Society for Cultural Anthropology, 24 March 2014.) (Note: Tourism: Bhan 2018, p. 86 "More significant, Brogpas used discourses of Aryanism to promote tourism and secure funds for the preservation of an "endangered and unique Aryan culture" that was allegedly threatened by forces of change and modernity."; Bhagabati 2021, p. 109: "The occult pull of their fabricated ancestry has become so irresistible that this region today is known as Aryan Valley in the tourism industry."; A. Divya (2019-02-08) The Dard Aryans of Ladakh: who are this tribe, what are their concerns?, The Indian Express: "They have demanded that the government set up a tribal hostel and declare the “Aryan valley” a heritage village to boost tourism.").However, it lacks scientific proof.

== Geography and economy ==
Historically, the area was known as Dah Hanu district to the British administrators, and as Brog Yul, "Hill country," in Tibetan. The villages and hamlets are situated 70 km east of Kargil along narrow valley of the Indus River at an elevation of 9000–10000 feet. (Note: Sharma 1998, p. 1: "It is situated in narrow rocky gorges of Indus Valley at the elevation of 9000-10000 ft. above the sea level [...] Surface approach to this land is either from Kargil (from Srinagar side) or from Leh, the headquarters of Ladakh. The distance from Kargil side is approximately 70 km. and from Leh 190 km.")

Agriculture — especially the cultivation of fruits like apricots and grapes — is the main driver of the economy. (Note: Sanjay Dutta (Aug 2, 2021))

== History ==
=== Brokpas ===
The region is inhabited by the Brokpas — an exonym, used by the Ladakhis (lit. Highlanders) — who are a sub-group of the Shin people. From their oral history, it can be reasoned that Dah-Hanu region was first occupied c. 10th century by a group of migratory Shins who practiced the largely-animist ancient Dardic religion, and staked claim to a "Minaro" ethnic identity. About six hundred years hence, another group of Shins — influenced by Hinduism and Buddhism — migrated to Dah-Hanu, fomenting a conflict but yet chose to live together. Their chieftains wielded significant autonomy in the region, pledging nominal allegiance to the Maqpon rulers of Skardu.The region has always been independent from both ladakh and Baltistan

However, things changed in the seventeenth century when Jamyang Namgyal of Ladakh faced a conflict with Ali Sher Khan Anchan of Skardu and had to accept Gurgurdho, the hamlet of Garkhone as a boundary between their territories. Consequently,Aryan Valley was integrated into Ladakh and were converted to Buddhism in c. late nineteenth century.Before the adoption of Buddhism, the Brokpa people followed their indigenous Minaro religion, characterized by animistic and nature-based beliefs. Nevertheless, cross-border trade also occurred, with the village serving as a tax collection post.

Consequently, Aryan valley integrated with Ladakh, though probably not to any substantial extent. In the early nineteenth century, as the region came under the Dogras of Jammu upon their annexation of Ladakh, it became part of Leh tehsil in the princely State of Jammu and Kashmir.

In 1947, as Jammu and Kashmir joined India, Aryan valley became part of the Ladakh Division. In 1979, it was further demarcated By putting Dah and Hanu in leh district, Garkhone and Darchik in newly-formed Kargil District . Local Brokpas have demanded representation to the seats reserved for minorities in the hill council.

Uninfluenced by Islam to any significant extent, the Brokpas of Dah-Hanu maintained a unique culture unlike most of neighboring Shins.

On April 27, 2026, all the villages of the Aryan Valley were merged together into the newly created Sham District by the Government of India, after being carved out of the Leh and Kargil districts. However people of Aryan valley of Ladakh are demanding either to grant them a subdivision or a district because to protect their culture which is different as compared to other part of the Ladakh.

=== Aryan association and neologism ===
In 1880, G. W. Leitner, a British orientalist, called the Brokpas "remnants of an ancient and pure Aryan race" — this trope would be reinforced by other colonial administrators, effectively exoticising them. The claims hold no merit and they run contrary to genetic analyses of the Brokpas. Mona Bhan, a Professor of South Asian Studies and Anthropology at Syracuse University, notes that such ahistorical racialising of linguistic and cultural traits has persisted even in modern ethnography on the Brokpas.

In 1980, H. P. S. Ahluwalia reported having met three German Neo-nazi female tourists who attended a Brokpa festival and hoped to be impregnated by the "pure Aryans"; such mythical tourists would be a staple of media coverage on the region. Over time, the Brokpas imbibed the Aryan characterization to the extent of tracing descent from Alexander's army. During the 2003 elections to the Kargil Hill Council, they claimed representation to the minority seats based on their Aryan identity, among other factors. However, this self-fashioning differed from the usual connotations of "Aryan" in the West. For the Brokpas, their Aryan identity laid in a millennia-old-struggle to maintain a unique identity in the face of persecution by various rulers, as told through folk-lores, and was a tool to improve their abject socioeconomic marginalization.

Beginning in 2010, as the Government wished to attract tourism to the region, local travel agents began to market the "Aryan-ness" of the inhabitants; the state government reinforced the trend by projecting the Brokpa people as "pure specimens of the Aryan race". Some Brogpas even changed their surnames to "Aryan". The name "Aryan Valley" was created within this discourse. In 2019, locals demanded that the "Aryan valley" be declared as a heritage village to boost tourism. The discourse on the Aryan traits of the Brokpas has been increasingly appropriated by right-wing Hindutva groups to leverage their supposed indigeneity against the Muslim other and to "validate their hold on India's disputed territory".

== Tourism ==
Mandatory Inner Line Permit (ILP) is needed for all tourists, including Indians and foreigners, to visit the Aryan Valley and other restricted areas, which can be applied online on Leh District's relevant website.

The annual 9-days long Aryan Valley Apricot Blossom Festival (locally known as Chuli Mendok) is an annual spring celebration held every year usually within first two weeks of April, though dates vary slightly every year as they are tied to the natural blooming cycle of the trees, which is influenced by winter snowfall and spring temperatures, the exact festival schedule is announced annually by the Ladakh Tourism Department to align with the blossoms. The official festival typically lasts about 9 days, though the entire blossoming window across the region's different altitudes can stretch from late March to early May. Lower altitude areas like the Aryan and Sham Valleys bloom first (early to mid-April), while higher regions near Leh and parts of Nubra bloom later (mid to late April). The festival is a vibrant display of the unique Brokpa community's traditions, including their in traditional attire (featuring elaborate floral headgear, heavy silver jewellery, and ornate beads), traditional performances (folk music, traditional dances, and storytelling by village elders), local food (apricot-based delicacies, including sun-dried apricots, jams, juices, and traditional Ladakhi dishes made with organic apricot oil), and traditional Ladakhi handicrafts, handloom stalls, and apricot wood carvings. Village homestays accommodation is available.

== Settlements and revenue villages ==
Aryan Valley is a cultural and geographical region inhabited predominantly by the Brokpa people. Nineteenth-century accounts of the region and its people include Frederic Drew's The Jummoo and Kashmir Territories: A Geographical Account (1875) and R. B. Shaw's Stray Arians in Tibet (1878).

The region encompasses four revenue villages: Dha-Bema, Hanu, Garkone and Darchiks.

Dha-Bema revenue village : It collectively forms a single gram panchayats government consist of following villages :
a) Dah village
b) Biama(phindor) village
c) Baldesh village
d) Lasthang village
e) Sanith village
f) Dundur village

Hanu revenue village: It collectively forms a single gram panchayats government consist of following villages:
a) Hanu Gongma village
b) Hanu Yokma village
c) Hanu Thang village
Garkone revenue village
a) Garkhone village
b) Hordas village
c) Gurgurdo village
d) Yaldor village

Darchiks revenue village
a) Darchik village
b) Sanache village
Garkhone and Darchik revenue villages together forms a single panchayat .
The settlements are geographically dispersed, and each has its own stream that provides water for irrigating agricultural fields.

== Administration ==
In 1979, the former Ladakh district was divided into Leh and Kargil districts; Dah and Hanu were in Leh district, while Garkone and Darchik were in Kargil district. Following appeals by representatives of the Aryan community for administrative unification, Aryan Valley was granted tehsil status in Sham district by the Ladakh Administration through Notification S.O. 286, dated 16 October 2026.

== See also ==
- Tourism in Ladakh
- Ladakh Lok Sabha constituency
- Yaldor Sub Sector

== Bibliography ==
Printed sources

- Arora, Vibha; Jayaram, N. (29 November 2020). Routeing Democracy in the Himalayas: Experiments and Experiences. Taylor & Francis. ISBN 978-1-000-08435-1.
- Bhagabati, Dikshit Sarma (2021), "Dancing by the Juniper: Notes from the performative space of the Brokpa's cultural enactment", Asian Journal of Social Science, 49 (2): 109–119, doi:10.1016/j.ajss.2021.01.002, ISSN 1568-4849, S2CID 235585739
- Bhan, Mona (2018), ""In Search of the Aryan Seed": Race, Religion, and Sexuality in Indian-Occupied Kashmir", in Haley Duschinski; Mona Bhan; Ather Zia; Cynthia Mahmood (eds.), Resisting Occupation in Kashmir, University of Pennsylvania Press, ISBN 978-0-8122-4978-1
- Bray, John (2008). "Corvée transport labour in 19th and early 20th century Ladakh: a study in continuity and change". In Martijn van Beek; Fernanda Pirie (eds.). Modern Ladakh: Anthropological Perspectives on Continuity and Change. BRILL. pp. 43–66. ISBN 978-90-474-4334-6.
- Drew, Frederick (1875). Jammoo And Kashmir Territories.
- Friese, Kai (2000). "The Aryan Handshake". Transition (83): 4–35. ISSN 0041-1191. JSTOR 3137472.
- Nicolaus, Peter (9 October 2015). "Residues of Ancient Beliefs among the Shin in the Gilgit-Division and Western Ladakh". Iran and the Caucasus. 19 (3): 201–264. doi:10.1163/1573384X-20150302. ISSN 1573-384X.
- Sharma, Devi Datt (1998). Tribal Languages of Ladakh: A concise grammar and dictionary of Brok-shad. Part One. Mittal Publications. p. 1. ISBN 978-81-7099-616-3.
- Shaw, R. B. (1878). "Stray Arians in Tibet". Journal of the Asiatic Society of Bengal. XLVII: 26– – via archive.org.
- Syama, Adikarla; Arun, Varadarajan Santhakumari; ArunKumar, GaneshPrasad; Subhadeepta, Ray; Friese, Kai; Pitchappan, Ramasamy (17 November 2019). "Origin and identity of the Brokpa of Dah-Hanu, Himalayas – an NRY-HG L1a2 (M357) legacy". Annals of Human Biology. 46 (7–8): 562–573. doi:10.1080/03014460.2019.1694700. ISSN 0301-4460. PMID 31856597. S2CID 209426139.
- Vohra, Rohit (1982), "Ethnographic Notes on the Buddhist Dards of Ladakh: The Brog-Pā", Zeitschrift für Ethnologie, 107 (1): 69–94, JSTOR 25841799

Web-sources
