= Baltistan =

Region of Pakistani-administered Kashmir

Baltistan بلتستان སྦལ་ཏི་སྟཱན་།
- Region
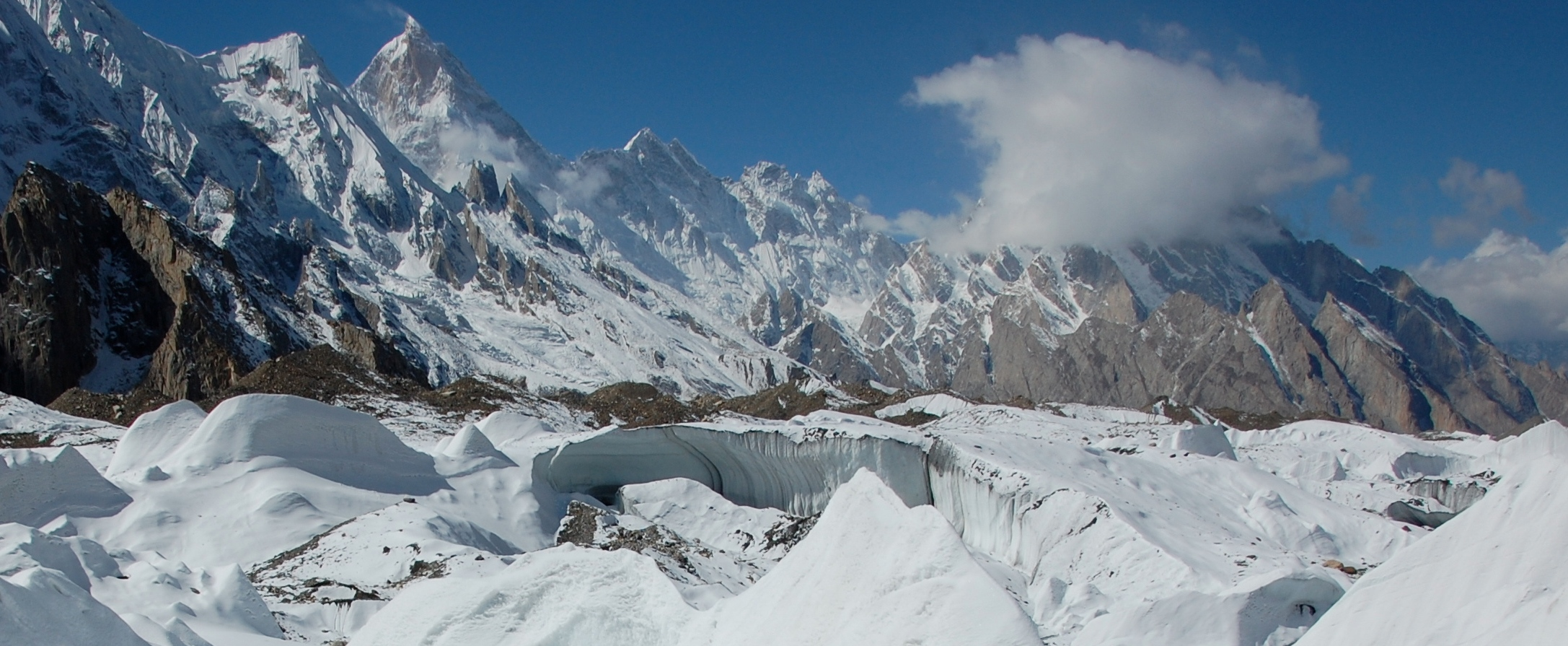

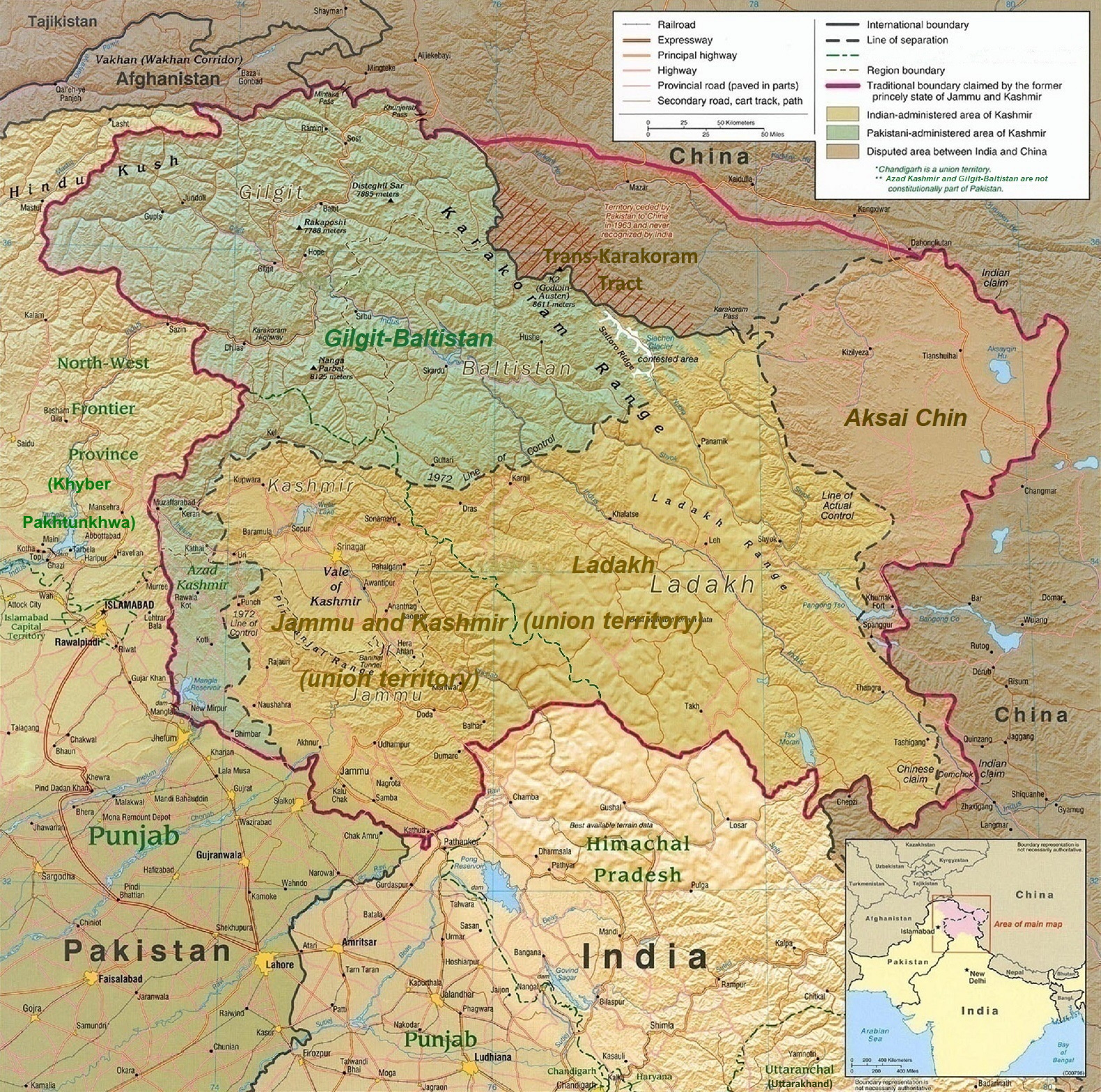
- A map of the disputed Kashmir region showing the Pakistani administered region of Baltistan, a part of Pakistani-administered Gilgit-Baltistan
- Coordinates: 35°18′N 75°37′E
- Administering Country: Pakistan
- Territory: Gilgit-Baltistan

Government
  - Type: Divisional Administration

Area
  - Total: 30,000 km^{2} (12,000 sq mi)

Population (2022)
  - Total: 637,450
- Languages: Official: English, Urdu; Spoken: Balti, Purgi, Changthang, Shina, Ladakhi and Brokskat

Baltistan (English: /ˌbɔːltɪˈstɑːn/, Urdu: [bəlt̪ɪst̪aːn]); also known as Baltiyul or Little Tibet, is a mountainous region in the Pakistani-administered territory of Gilgit-Baltistan and constitutes a northern portion of the larger Kashmir region that has been the subject of a dispute between India and Pakistan since 1947. Administered under the Baltistan Division, it is located southwest of the Karakoram and borders Gilgit and Diamer divisions to the west, Xinjiang of China to the north, Indian-administered Ladakh to the southeast, and the Indian-administered Kashmir Valley to the southwest. The average altitude of the region is over 3,350 metres (10,990 ft).

Prior to the partition of British India in 1947, Baltistan was part of the princely state of Jammu and Kashmir, having been conquered by Gulab Singh's armies in 1840. Baltistan and Ladakh were administered jointly under one wazarat or district, Ladakh Wazarat, of the state. The region retained its identity in this setup as the Skardu tehsil, with Kargil and Leh being the other two tehsils of the district. After Hari Singh, the last maharaja of Jammu and Kashmir, acceded to the Dominion of India in 1947, his local governor in Gilgit was overthrown by the Gilgit Scouts. Rebel groups later took the entire region for Pakistan during the Indo-Pakistani War of 1947–1948. The region is inhabited primarily by the Balti people, a predominantly Muslim ethnic group of Tibetan descent. Baltistan is strategically significant to both Pakistan and India; the Siachen conflict and the Kargil War took place in this region alongside others.

== Etymology ==
The name Baltistan is composed of the ethnonym Balti and the suffix -stan, literally "the land of", hence "the land of the Baltis". One source gives the meaning of the word Balti as "valley", with Baltistan being translated as "the land of valleys". The Balti people themselves call their homeland as Baltiyul (lit. 'the land of the Baltis'). In the 2nd century CE, Greco-Roman geographer Ptolemy referred to the region as Byaltae. The first recorded mention of the term Baltistan is from 1715 CE.

== History ==
=== Origins ===
Tibetan Khampa entered in Khaplu through Chorbat Valley and Dardic tribes came to Baltistan through Roundu Valley from Gilgit prior to civilization, and these groups eventually settled down, resulting in the genesis of the Balti people.

Today, the people of Kharmang and Chorbat Valley have Tibetan features while those in Skardu, Shigar and the western villages of Khaplu have Dardic. It was believed that the Balti people were in the sphere of influence of Zhangzhung. Baltistan was controlled by the Tibetan king in 686. Culturally influenced by Tibet, the Bon and animist Baltis began to adopt Tibetan Buddhism. Religious artifacts such as gompas and stupas were built, and lamas played an important role in Balti life.

For centuries, Baltistan consisted of small, independent valley states connected by the blood relationships of its rulers (rajas), trade, common beliefs and cultural and linguistic bonds. Baltistan was known as Little Tibet, and the name was extended to include Ladakh. Ladakh later became known as Great Tibet. Locally, Baltistan is known as Baltiyul and Ladakh and Baltistan are known as Maryul ("red country").

=== Medieval and early modern history ===
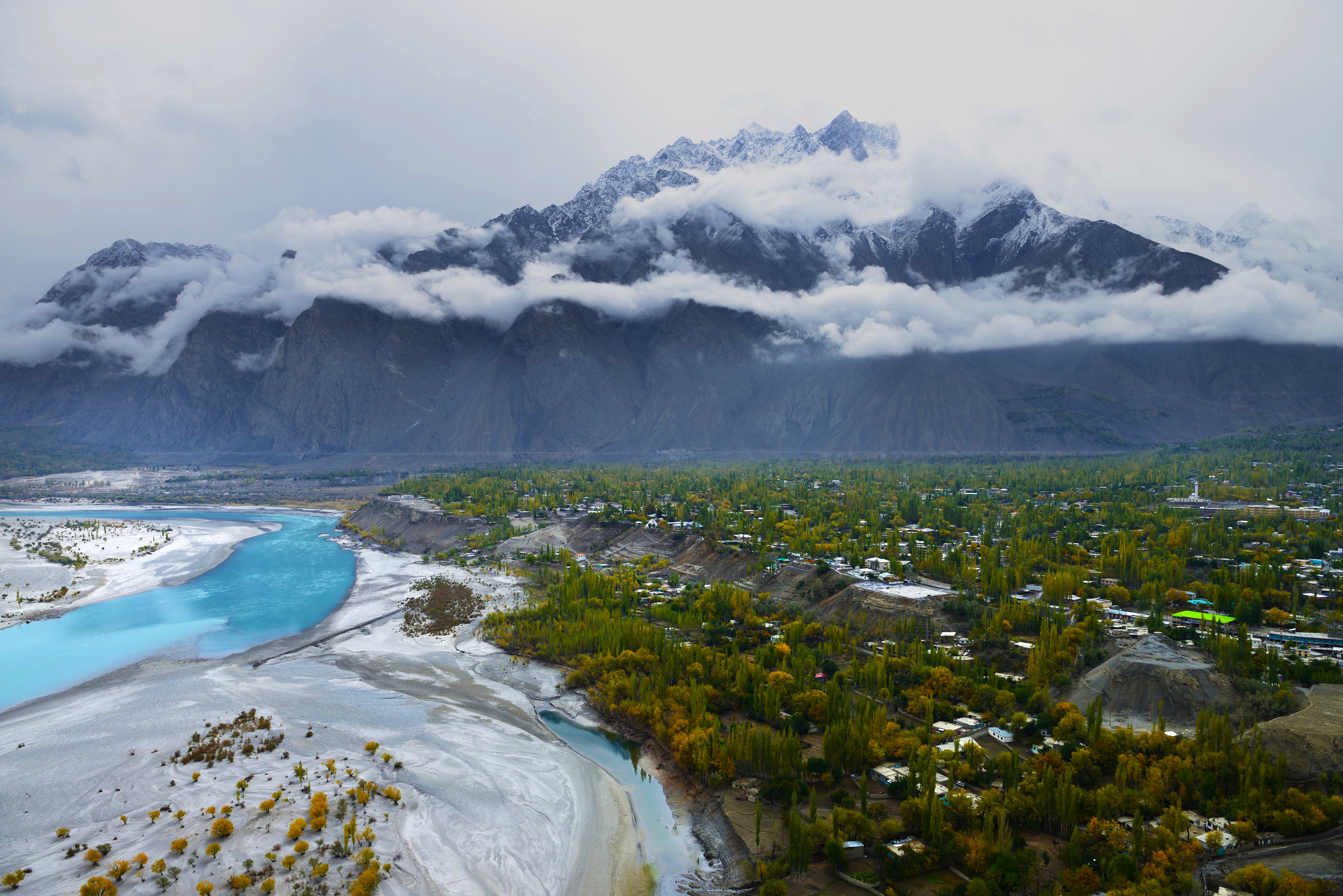
Skardu, the traditional capital of Baltistan, is located on the banks of Indus River.

Medieval Baltistan was divided into three main kingdoms: Skardu, Shigar, and Khaplu. The Maqpon dynasty, which ruled from Skardu, also later established side branches at Kartaksho and Roundu.

During the 14th century, Muslim scholars from Kashmir crossed Baltistan's mountainous terrain to spread Islam. The Noorbakhshia Sufi order further propagated the faith in Baltistan and Islam became dominant by the end of the 17th century. With the passage of time a large number also converted to Shia Islam and a few converted to Sunni Islam.

The Maqpon dynasty is traditionally believed to have been founded in Skardu during the 12th century. This royal family ruled over Baltistan for next seven centuries. The kings of the Maqpon dynasty extended the frontiers of Baltistan to Gilgit, Chitral, and Ladakh. In the late 1500s/early 1600s, the Maqpon rulers of Skardu expanded their kingdom to include Shigar, Astor, Rondu, and Karataksha. The greatest ruler during this period was Alī Sher Khān, known as "Anchan", or "the Great". After the Mughal conquest of Kashmir in 1586, during the reign of Anchan's grandfather Ghāzī Mīr, diplomatic relations developed between the Mughals and the Maqpon rulers of Baltistan. A Balti princess was sent to the Mughal court, and according to local tradition, a Mughal princess was also sent to Skardu and built a Mughal-style fort at Mandok, although Dani describes her as a Ladakhi princess, Mandok Gyalmo, instead. Around 1595, the Mughal historian Abu'l-Fazl wrote that Kashmir was then importing silkworm eggs (for sericulture) from Gilgit and Baltistan.

The Kharmang came under the control of the Namgyal royal family and developed a close relationship with Ladakh when the raja of Ladakh, Jamyang Mangyal, attacked the principalities in Kargil. Mangyal annihilated the Skardu garrison at Kharbu and put to the sword a number of petty Muslim rulers in the principalities of Purik (Kargil). Ali Sher Khan Anchan, raja of Khaplu and Shigar, left with a strong army via Marol. Passing the Ladakhi army, he occupied Leh (the capital of Ladakh) and the raja of Ladakh was taken prisoner. A marital alliance was subsequently established, resulting in Anchan marrying Jamyang's daughter Mandok Gyalmo while Jamyang marrying a Balti princess, Gyal Khatun.

Ali Sher Khan Anchan included Gilgit and Chitral in his kingdom of Baltistan, reportedly a flourishing country. The valley from Khepchne to Kachura was flat and fertile, with abundant fruit trees; the sandy desert now extending from Sundus to Skardu International Airport was a prosperous town. Skardu had hardly recovered from the shock of the death of Anchan when it was flooded.

After the death of Anchan in 1633, the Maqpon polity declined as his three sons fought among themselves. One of them, Adam Khān, had fled to Kashmir and then sought refuge with the Mughal emperor Jahāngīr while Anchan was still alive. In 1637, Adam accompanied a Mughal expedition into Baltistan led by Zafar Khān. Adam's elder brother (and rival) Abdāl was captured, and Zafar Khān announced Mughal suzerainty over Baltistan. However, with winter coming, Zafar hastily withdrew his troops from Baltistan and appointed one of Abdāl's partisans to govern the territory on his behalf, which upset the Mughal emperor Shāh Jahān. Ultimately, though, Adam Khān ended up taking control of Baltistan. Both he and his successor, Murād Khān, acknowledged Mughal suzerainty.

The official Mughal historian Abdul Hamid Lahori left an account of Baltistan in his entry for the year 1638. He wrote that Baltistan had 22 parganas and 37 forts. Its narrow mountain valleys could support limited cultivation, primarily of wheat and barley; certain fruits also thrived in the local climate. Rather poor-quality gold was collected from river sands in small amounts – only about 2,000 tolas (about 9.5 kg) was collected per year.

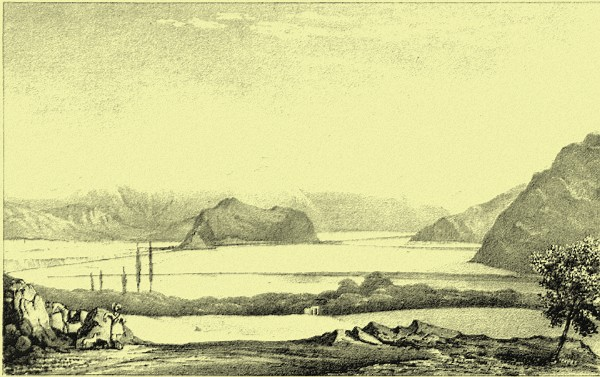
Skardu in 1800

The Kingdom of Khaplu probably came into existence around the 10th century following the breakup of the Tibetan Empire. Its ruling dynasty was known as the Yabgu dynasty, after the Turkish title of yabghu. The local population was Buddhist up until around the 14th century, when Sayyid Alī Hamadānī is credited with spreading Islam to the region. Khaplu was conquered by Skardu under Alī Sher Khān Anchan in the early 1600s. From then on, it was administered by a governor, or kharpon, appointed by the ruler in Skardu. The last kharpon was Yulehing Karīm, who governed Khaplu from 1820 to 1840, when the Dogra commander Zorāwar Singh conquered it.

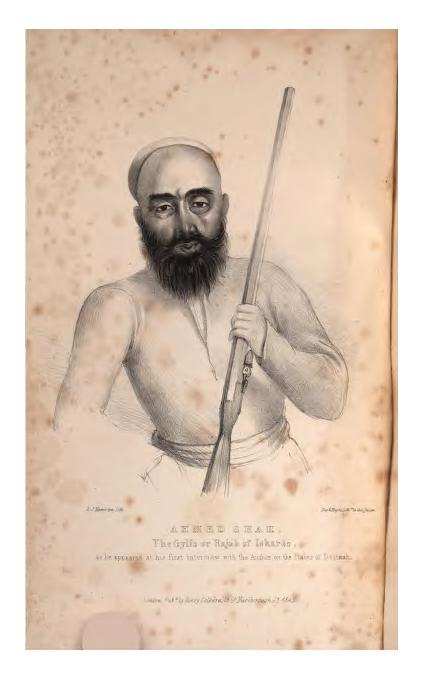
Ahmed Shah, the last Maqpon king before the 1840 Dogra invasion

In 1840, the region was subjugated by the Dogra rulers of Jammu under the suzerainty of the Sikh Empire. In the first Indo-Pakistan War, Baltistan become part of Pakistan following Gilgit Rebellion. On 29 August 2009 the government of Pakistan announced the establishment of Gilgit-Baltistan, an autonomous region with Gilgit as its capital.

== Geography ==
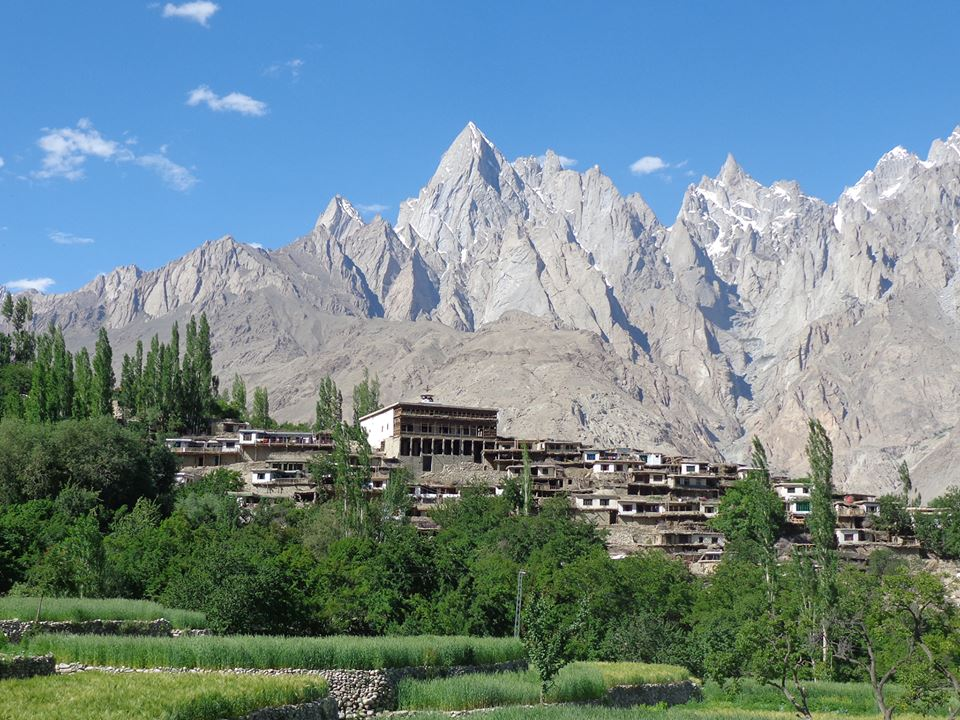
A typical Balti village

The 1911 Encyclopaedia Britannica characterises Baltistan as the western extremity of Tibet, whose natural limits are the Indus River from its abrupt southward bend around the map point 35.86°N 74.72°E and the mountains to the north and west. These features separate a comparatively peaceful Tibetan population from the Indo-Aryan tribes to the west. Muslim writers around the 16th century speak of Baltistan as the "Little Tibet", and of Ladakh as the "Great Tibet", emphasising their ethnological similarity. According to Ahmad Hassan Dani, Baltistan spreads upwards from the Indus River and is separated from Ladakh by the Siachen Glacier. It includes the Indus Valley and the lower valley of the Shyok River.

Baltistan is a rocky mass of lofty mountains, the prevailing formation being gneiss. In the north is the 56 kilometres (35 mi) long Baltoro Glacier, one of the longest glaciers outside of the polar regions, contained between two ridges whose highest peaks to the south are 7,600 m (25,000 ft) and to the north 8,615 m (28,265 ft).

According to the 1908 Imperial Gazetteer, the most important tracts in Baltistan are Skārdu, Shigar, Braldah, Basha, Rondu, Haramosh, Kiris, Khapalu, Chorbat, Parkutta, and Tolti. Farther east lies Kargil, where some of the population are Buddhists, acknowledging the Grand Lama of Lhasa as their spiritual head. The Indus River runs in a narrow gorge, widening after receiving the Shyok River at 35.23°N 75.92°E. It then forms a 32-kilometre (20 mi) crescent-shaped plain varying between 2 and 8 kilometres (1 and 5 mi) in width.

The village of Chalunkha in Chorbat, now in Leh District, is traditionally considered the southernmost settlement of Baltistan, delimiting it from the Nubra region of Ladakh. The traditional boundary of Baltistan with Ladakh along Nubra Valley was finalised in the early 19th century by the ruler of Khaplu, while that of along Suru Valley was demarcated at Ghargurdo, between Ganokh and Garkon, in the 17th century following a battle between Balti Gyalfo Ali Senge Anchan and Ladakhi Gyalpo Jamyang Namgyal. Ruins of a series of watchtowers, which were jointly guarded by the both kingdoms, are still found here. A few villages of the Kharmang ilaqa, such as Hardas and Karkichu in the Suru River Valley, remained part of Kargil after the First Kashmir War. They mark the former southern boundary of Baltistan, and are populated by ethnic Baltis till today.

The Gilgit Agency and Skardu tehsil, as well as a portion of Kargil tehsil, (Note: According to the 1961 Census of India, 31 complete and 5 partial villages of Kargil came under Pakistani control and subsequently became part of Baltistan, amounting to an area of some 1,567.2 mi^{2} (4,059 km^{2}). However, all of these villages had belonged to the Kharmang ilaqa of Baltistan, which was transferred from Skardu tehsil to Kargil in 1901. A few villages of the Kharmang ilaqa, such as Hardas and Karkichu, remained part of Kargil.) have been under Pakistani governance since 1947 with the Kashmir Valley as well as Leh tehsil and most of the Kargil tehsil being under Indian governance. The Chorbat Valley, a section of the Shyok River Valley, was divided when its four villages were captured by India during the Indo-Pakistani War of 1971, and were incorporated into the erstwhile Jammu and Kashmir state (now in Ladakh).

== Administration ==
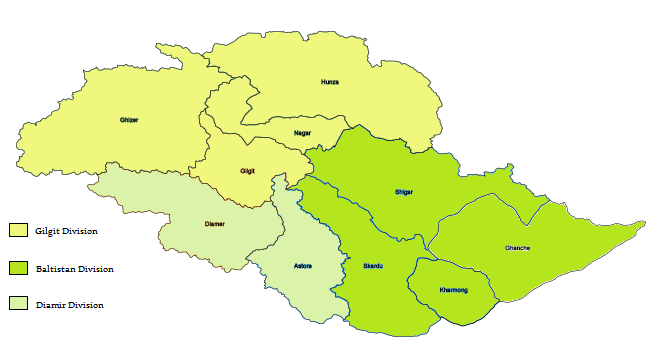
Baltistan division, in dark green, Gilgit Baltistan

The Baltistan is one of three divisions of Gilgit-Baltistan. It is administered under a BPS-20 Commissioner of Pakistan Administrative Service group of Central Superior Services of Pakistan.

=== Valleys and districts ===
Valley	District	District Area (km^{2})	Population (2023)	Capital
Chorbat°	Ghanche and Leh	8,531 (in Ghanche) 883 (in Leh)	157,822 (in Ghanche)	Khaplu (in Ghanche) Turtuk (in Leh)
Skardu	Skardu	10,168	278,885	Skardu
Shigar	Shigar	4,173	84,608	Shigar
Kharmang	Kharmang	6,144	61,304	Tolti
Total		29,889	582,619	

°Although considered part of Baltistan, Chorbat Valley has been divided between Pakistan and India, after territorial exchanges during 1972 Simla treaty.

== Tourism ==
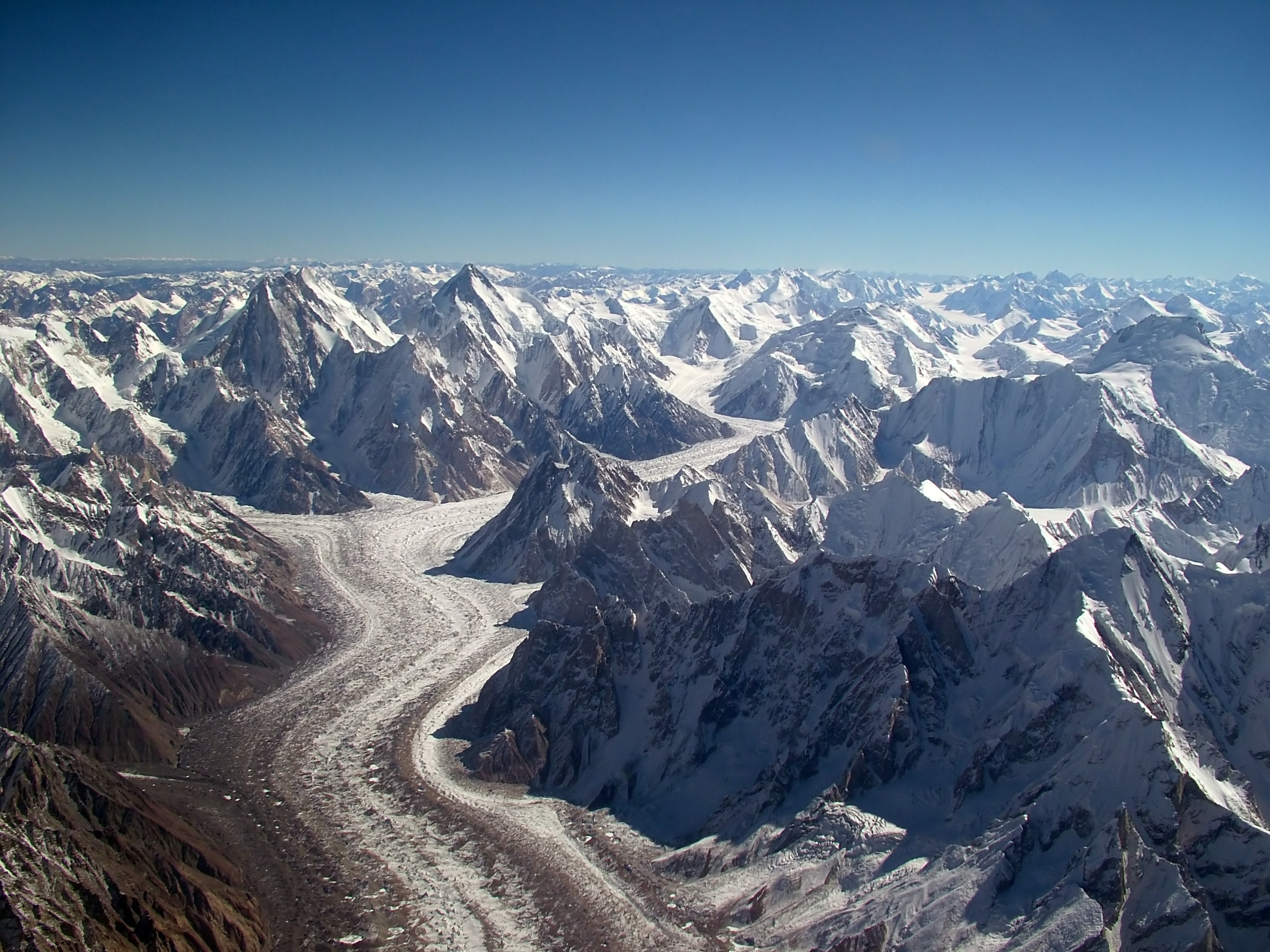
Baltoro Glacier; at 62 km (39 mi) in length, it is one of the longest Alpine glaciers on earth.

Skardu has several tourist resorts and many natural features, including plains, mountains and mountain-valley lakes. The Deosai Plain, Satpara Lake and Basho are also tourist hotspots. North of Skardu, the Shigar Valley offers plains, hiking tracks, peaks and campsites. Other valleys in Baltistan region are Khaplu, Rondu, Kachura Lake and Kharmang.

=== Glaciers ===
Baltistan is a rocky wilderness of around 70,000 square kilometres (27,000 sq mi), with the largest cluster of mountains in the world and the biggest glaciers outside the polar regions. The Himalayas advance into this region from India, Tibet and Nepal, and north of them are the Karakoram range. Both ranges run northwest, separated by the Indus River. Along the Indus and its tributaries are many valleys. Glaciers include Baltoro Glacier, Biafo Glacier, Siachen Glacier, Trango Glacier and Godwin-Austen Glacier.

=== Mountaineering ===
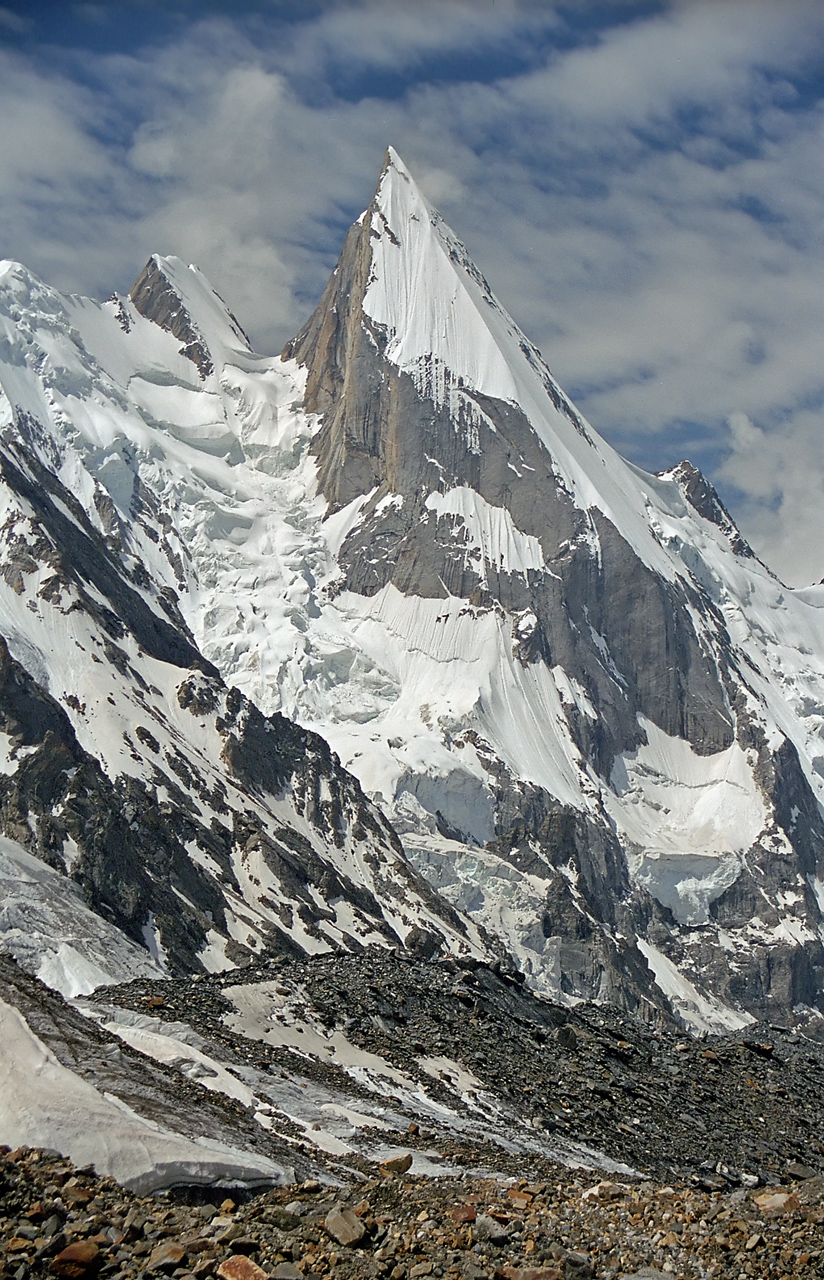
Laila Peak, in the Hushe Valley

Baltistan is home to more than 20 peaks of over 6,100 metres (20,000 ft), including K2 (the second-highest mountain on earth. Other well-known peaks include Masherbrum (also known as K1), Broad Peak, Hidden Peak, Gasherbrum II, Gasherbrum IV and Chogolisa (in the Khaplu Valley). The following peaks have been scaled:

Name	Height	Date climbed	Location
K2	8,610 m (28,250 ft)	31 July 1954	Shigar District
Gasherbrum I	8,030 m (26,360 ft)	7 July 1956	Ghanche District
Broad Peak	8,090 m (26,550 ft)	9 June 1957	Ghanche District
Muztagh Tower	7,300 m (23,800 ft)	6 August 1956	Ghanche District
Gasherbrum II	7,960 m (26,120 ft)	4 July 1958	Ghanche District
Hidden Peak	8,070 m (26,470 ft)	4 July 1957	Ghanche District
Khunyang Chhish	7,852 m (25,761 ft)	4 July 1971	Skardu District
Masherbrum	7,821 m (25,659 ft)	4 August 1960	Ghanche District
Saltoro Kangri	7,700 m (25,400 ft)	4 June 1962	Ghanche District
Chogolisa	7,665 m (25,148 ft)	4 August 1963	Ghanche District

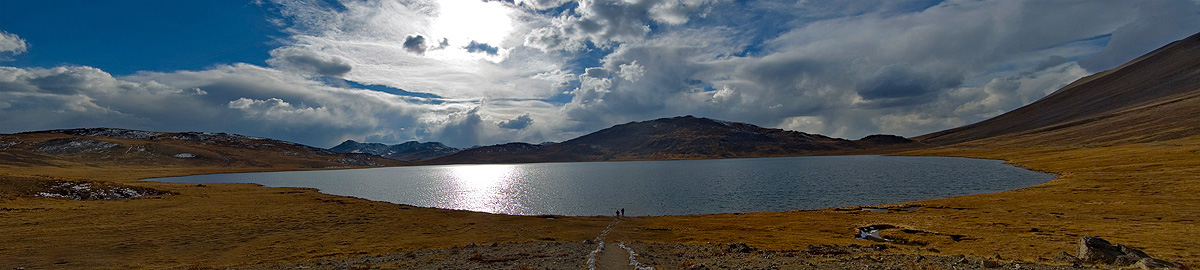
Panoramic view of Sheosar Lake in Deosai Plains

== Demographics ==
The Baltistan Division has a population of about 582,619 as of 2023. It is a blend of ethnic groups, predominantly Baltis, and Tibetans. A few Kashmiris are settled in Skardu, practicing agriculture and woodcraft.

== Religion ==
Before the arrival of Islam, Tibetan Buddhism and Bön (to a lesser extent) were the main religions in Baltistan. Buddhism can be traced back to before the formation of the Tibetan Empire in the region during the seventh century. The region has a number of surviving Buddhist archaeological sites. These include the Manthal Buddha Rock, a rock relief of the Buddha at the edge of the village (near Skardu) and the Sacred Rock of Hunza. Nearby are former sites of Buddhist shelters.

Islam was brought to Baltistan by Sufi missionaries during the 16th and 17th centuries, and most of the population converted to Noorbakhshia Islam. The scholars were followers of the Kubrawiya Sufi order. Most Noorbakhshi Muslims live in Ghanche.

== Fauna ==
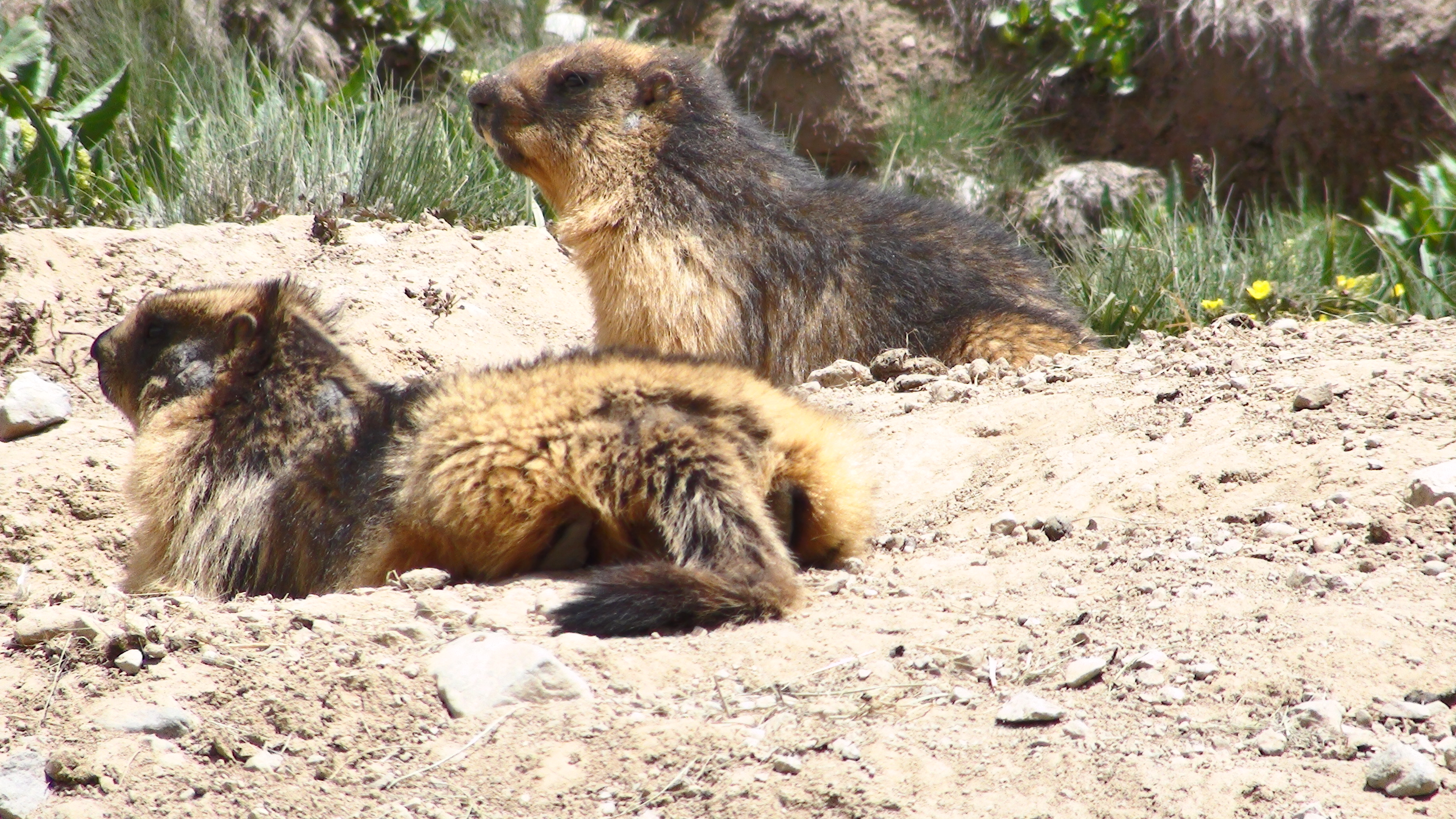
Golden marmots in Deosai National Park

Baltistan has been called a living museum for wildlife. Deosai National Park, in the southern part of the region, is habitat for predators since it has an abundant prey population. Domestic animals include yaks (including hybrid yaks), cattle, sheep, goats, horses and donkeys. Wild animals include ibex, markhor, musk deer, snow leopards, brown and black bears, jackals, foxes, wolves and marmots.

== Culture ==
=== Balti music and art ===
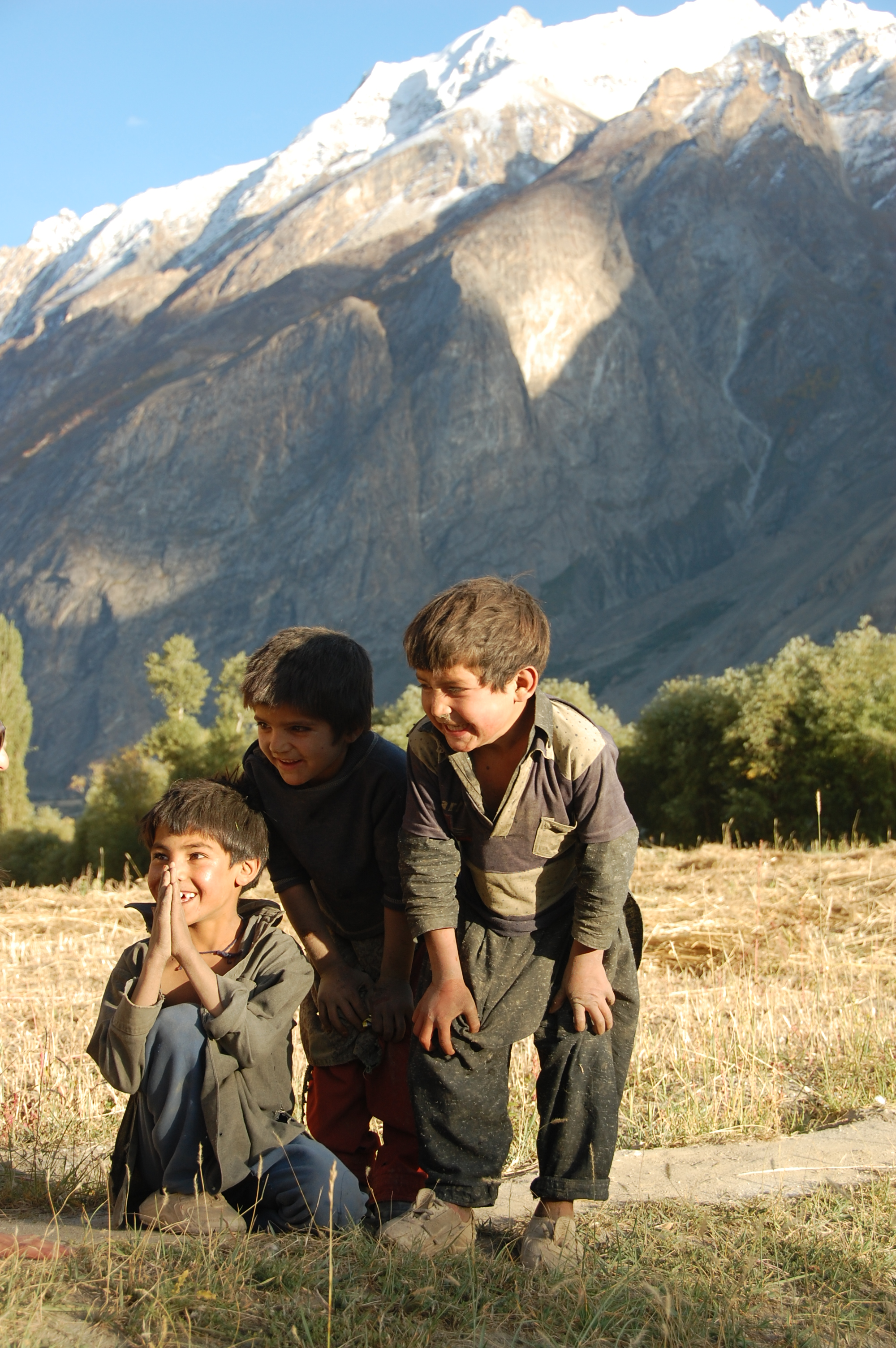
Balti children from the Shigar Valley

According to Balti folklore, a Mughal princess Gul Khatoon (known in Baltistan as Mindoq Gyalmo—Flower Queen) brought musicians and artisans with her into the region and they propagated Mughal music and art under her patronage. Musical instruments such as the surnai, karnai, dhol and chang were introduced into Baltistan.

==== Dance ====
Classical and other dances are classified as sword dances, broqchhos and Yakkha and ghazal dances. Chhogho Prasul commemorates a victory by the Maqpon rajas. As a mark of respect, the musician who plays the drum (dang) plays for a long time. A Maqpon princess would occasionally dance to this tune. Gasho-Pa, also known as Ghbus-La-Khorba, is a sword dance associated with the Gasho Dynasty of Purik (Kargil). Sneopa, the marriage-procession dance by pachones (twelve wazirs who accompany the bride), is performed at the marriage of a raja.

=== Architecture ===
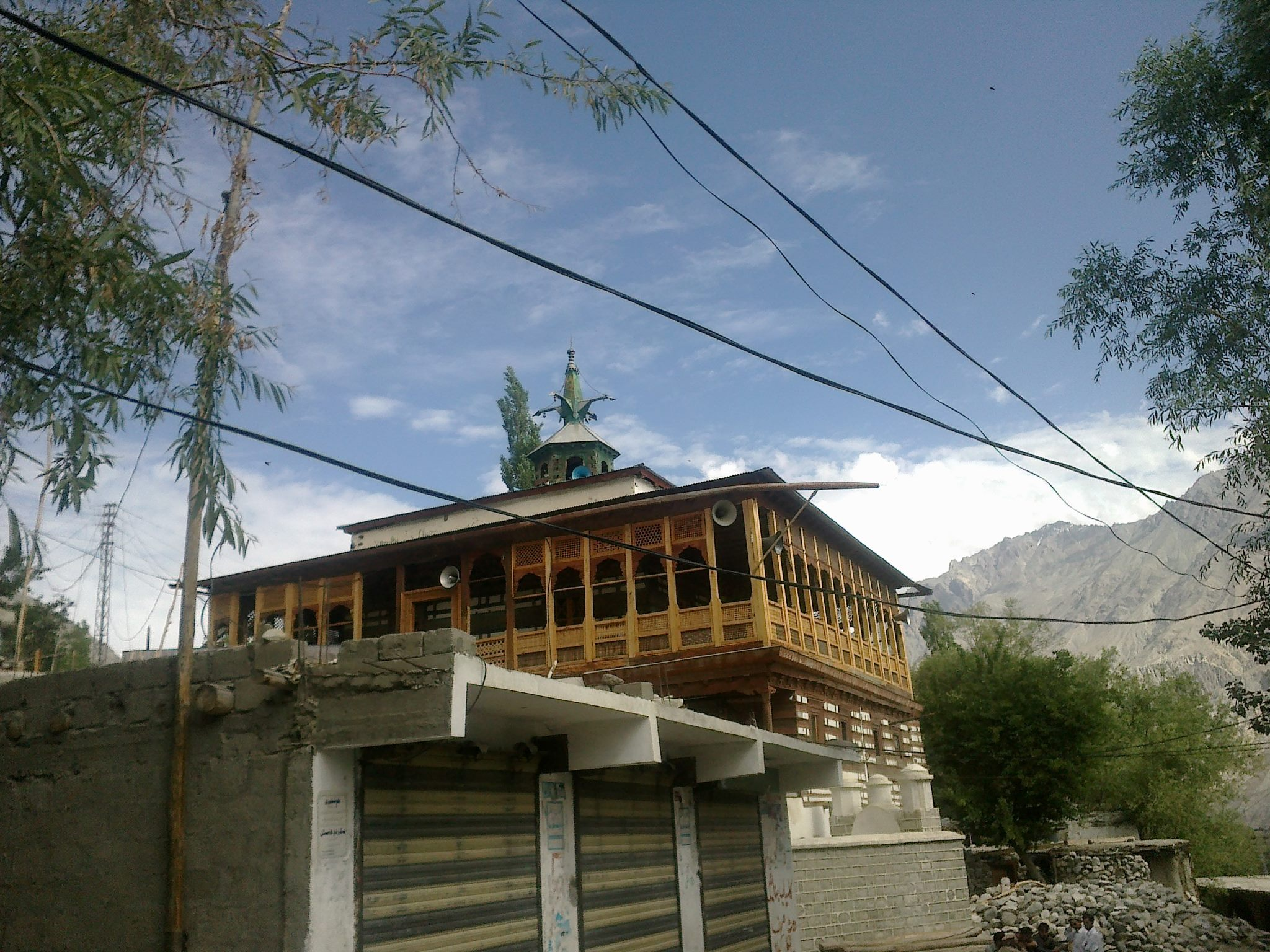
Chaqchan Mosque in Khaplu

Balti architecture has Tibetan and Mughul influences, and its monastic architecture reflects the Buddhist imprint left on the region. Buddhist-style wall paintings can be seen in forts and Noorbakhshi khanqahs, including Chaqchan Mosque in Khaplu, Amburik Mosque in Shigar, Khanqah e Muallah Shigar, Khaplu Fort, Shigar Fort and Skardu Fort.

=== Polo ===
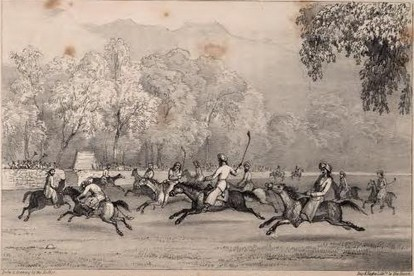
Polo match in Skardu around 1820, from Godfrey Vigne's Travels in Kashmir, Ladak, Iskardo, the countries adjoining the mountain-course of the Indus, and the Himalaya, north of the Panjab

Polo is popular in Baltistan, and indigenous to the Karakoram region, having been played there since at least the 15th–16th century. The Maqpon ruler Ali Sher Khan Anchan introduced the game to other valleys during his conquests beyond Gilgit and Chitral. The English word polo derives from the Balti word polo, meaning "the ball used in the game of polo". The game of polo itself is called Hrthapolo means horse riding game in Balti.

== Media ==
The Pakistan Broadcasting Corporation has radio and television stations in Khaplu that broadcast local programs, and there are a handful of private news outlets. The Daily K2 is an Urdu newspaper published in Skardu serving Gilgit-Baltistan for long time, and it is the pioneer of print media in Gilgit-Baltistan. Bad-e-Shimal claims the largest daily circulation in Gilgit and Baltistan.

== Bibliography ==
- Aggarwal, Ravina (2004), Beyond Lines of Control: Performance and Politics on the Disputed Borders of Ladakh, India, Duke University Press, pp. 199–, ISBN 0-8223-3414-3
- Dani, Ahmad Hasan (1998), "The Western Himalayan States", in M. S. Asimov; C. E. Bosworth (eds.), History of Civilizations of Central Asia, Vol. IV, Part 1 – The age of achievement: A.D. 750 to the end of the fifteenth century – The historical, social and economic setting, UNESCO, pp. 215–225, ISBN 978-92-3-103467-1
- Karim, Afsir (2009), "Strategic dimensions of the trans-Himalayan frontiers", in K. Warikoo (ed.), Himalayan Frontiers of India: Historical, Geo-Political and Strategic Perspectives, Routledge, pp. 56–66, ISBN 978-1-134-03294-5
- Pirumshoev, H. S.; Dani, Ahmad Hasan (2003), "The Pamirs, Badakhshan and the Trans-Pamir States", in Chahryar Adle; Irfan Habib (eds.), History of Civilizations of Central Asia, Vol. V – Development in contrast: From the sixteenth to the mid-nineteenth century, UNESCO, pp. 225–246, ISBN 978-92-3-103876-1
