= Brokskat language =

Indo-Aryan language spoken in India and Pakistan

Brokskat
- Minaro / مینارو
- དརྡ་དི་ཨརྱ། / بروقسکت
- Native to: India, Pakistan
- Region: Ladakh, Baltistan
- Ethnicity: Brokpa (Dards)
- Native speakers: (about 3,000 cited 1996)
- Language family: Indo-European: Indo-Iranian; Indo-Aryan; Eastern Dardic; Shinaic; Brokskat
- Writing system: Tibetan script, Nastaliq script

Language codes
- ISO 639-3: bkk
- Glottolog: brok1247
- ELP: Brokskat

Brokskat (Tibetan: འབྲོག་སྐད་, Wylie: ’brog skad) or Minaro is an endangered Indo-Aryan language spoken by the Brokpa people in the lower Indus Valley of Ladakh and its surrounding areas. It is the oldest surviving member of the ancient Dardic language. It is considered a divergent variety of Shina, but it is not mutually intelligible with the other dialects of Shina. It is only spoken by 2,858 people in Ladakh and 400 people in the adjoining Baltistan (in areas such as the Kharmang Valley), part of Gilgit-Baltistan, a region administered by Pakistan.

== Phonology ==
=== Consonants ===
| | | Labial | Dental/ alveolar | Palatal | Velar | | Glottal |
| | | Labial | Dental/ alveolar | Palatal | plain | labialized | Glottal |
|---|---|---|---|---|---|---|---|
| Nasal | | m | n | | ŋ | | |
| Stop | voiceless | p | t | | k | kʷ | |
| Stop | voiced | b | d | | ɡ | ɡʷ | |
| Affricate | voiceless | | t͡s | | | | |
| Affricate | voiced | | d͡z | | | | |
| Fricative | voiceless | f | s | | | | h |
| Fricative | voiced | v | z | | | | |
| Approximant | | | l | j | | w | |
| Trill | | | r | | | | |

=== Vowels ===
Vowel inventory
| | Front | | Central | | Back | |
|---|---|---|---|---|---|---|
| Close | /i/ | /iː/ | | | /u/ | /uː/ |
| Mid | /e/ | /eː/ | | | /o/ | /oː/ |
| Open | | | /a/ | /aː/ | | |

== Etymology ==
Exonym

The term Brokskat translates to 'the language of the Brokpa' in the Tibetic language. The name Brokpa is used by Ladakhi and Balti Tibetic origin people to refer to this ethnic group. Brokpa means 'hill-dweller' or 'hillbilly', reflecting their historical lifestyle as hunters in the upper mountainous regions.

Endonym

The Brokpa themselves refer to their language as Minaro and identify their ethnic group with the term as well. Their ancient religion is also known as Minaro. Recent articles also refer to the Brokpa community as "Dard Aryans", recognizing it as their cultural identity.

== Vocabulary ==
| English | Brokskat in Roman script | Brokskat in Bodyig script | Nastaliq Script |
|---|---|---|---|
| Water | wa | ཝུའ་ | وا |
| Fire | ghur | གཱུར | غُور |
| Sun | Suri | སུརིའ་ | سُوری |
| Moon | gyun | གྱུན | گیون |
| Mountain | chur | ཆུར | چُھور |
| Human | mush | མུཤ | مُوش |
| Land | bun | བུན | بُون |
| Boy | byo | བྱོ | بیو |
| Girl | molay | མོལེའ་ | مولیہ |
| Baby | bubu | བུའབུའ | بُوبُو |
| Knife | cutter | ཀཊའར | قَٹر |

== Verb tenses ==
There are two tenses, past and non-past.

| English | Brokskat-present tense | Brokskat-past tense | Broskat-future tense | Imperative |
|---|---|---|---|---|
| To go | byas | go (Note: Not english as per the citation in this section.) | byungs | boyai |
| To stand | autheis | authait | authiyungs | authi |
| To break | phitais | phitaiat | phitiaungs | phitai |
| To open | aunis | auniat | auniungs | auni |
| To laugh | hazis | hazit | haziungs | hazi |
| To sit | bazhais | bazhit | bazhiungs | bazhi |
| To walk | zazis | zazit | zaziungs | zazi |
| To throw | faitis | faitiat | fatiungs | fati |
| To look | skis | skait | skiungs | ski |
| To cut | chhinis | chinait | chhiniungs | chhini |
| To count | gyanis | gyaniat | gyaniungs | gyani |

== Bibliography ==
- Ramaswamy, N (1982). Brokskat Grammar. CIIL Grammar Series. Central Institute of Indian Languages.

Template:Languages of Ladakh
