= Dah Hanu =

- Twin Villages
- Location in Ladakh, India Dah Hanu (India)
- Coordinates: 34.60°N 76.50°E
- Country: India
- Union Territory: Ladakh
- District: Sham
- Tehsil: Skurbhchan

Population (2011)
  - Total: 1,816
- Time zone: UTC+5:30 (IST)

Dah (also known as Dha) and Hanu are two villages of the Brokpa people of the Sham district in the Indian union territory of Ladakh. Until 2010, these were the only two villages where tourists were allowed to visit out of a number of Brokpa villages.

The two villages situated in the Dha Hanu valley, also known as Aryan valley, about 163 km northwest of Leh in Ladakh. Being at a lower altitude, Dha and Hanu is warmer than Leh, allowing for the cultivation of wine-grapes and cherries as well as apricots and walnuts.

The Brokpa people of Dah Hanu are nominally Buddhist but also worship their own animist pantheon of gods. They converted to Buddhism in the mid-nineteenth century. They have an Indo-European appearance in contrast to the predominant Tibeto-Mongol inhabitants of most of Ladakh. According to popular belief, the Brokpas were part of the army of Alexander the Great and came to the region over two thousand years ago.

"Some households still practice polyandry...it is the groom who pays the bride price. Women have rights of divorce."

== See also ==
- Geography of Ladakh
- Tourism in Ladakh
