= Kanji, Ladakh =

Kanji
- village
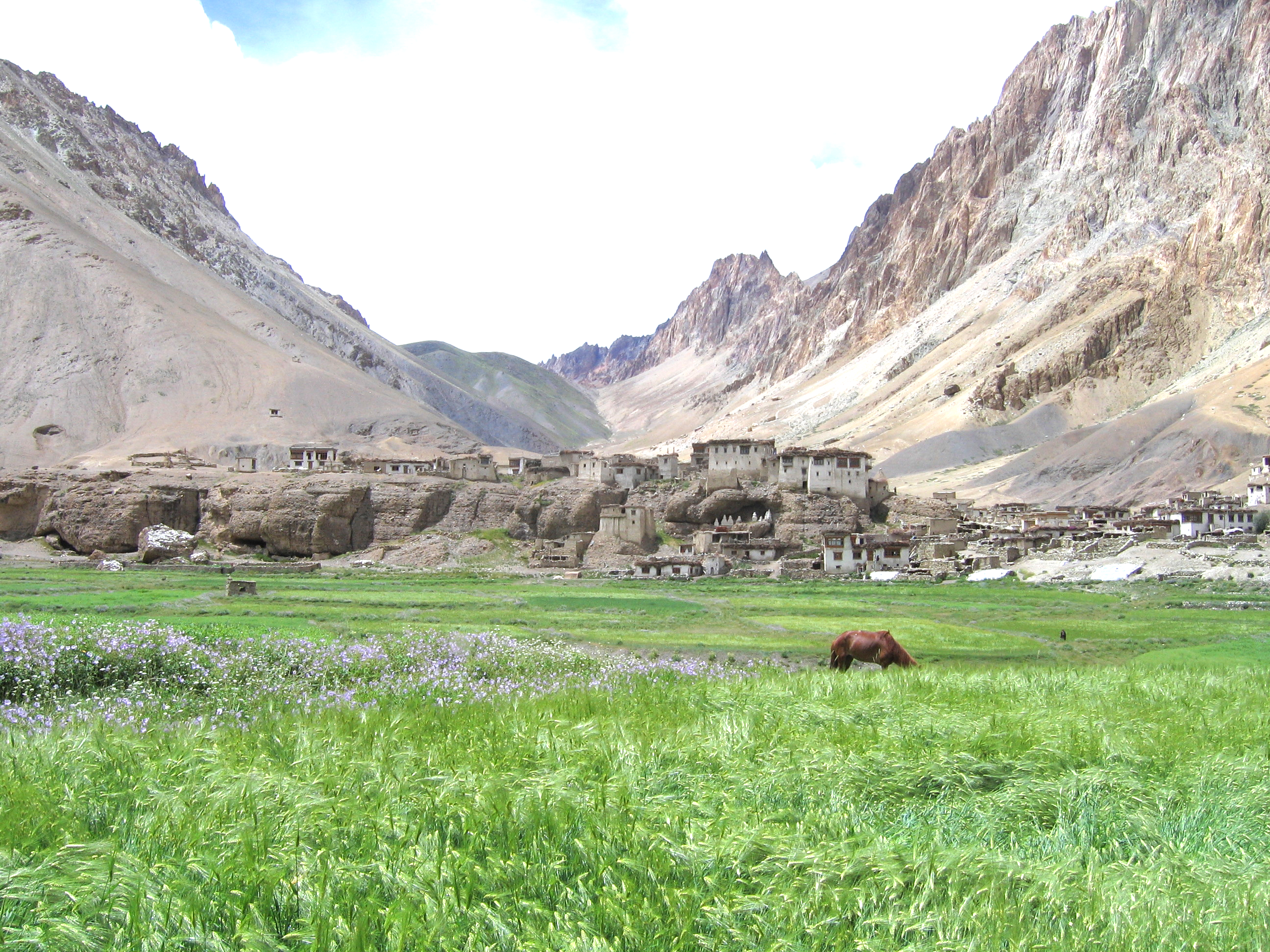
- Kanji Village

- Location in Ladakh, India Kanji (India)
- Coordinates: 34.25°N 76.6°E
- Country: India
- Union Territory: Ladakh
- District: Sham
- Tehsil: Wanla
- Elevation: 3,875 m (12,713 ft)

Population (2011)
  - Total: 325
- Time zone: UTC+5:30 (IST)
- 2011 census code: 958

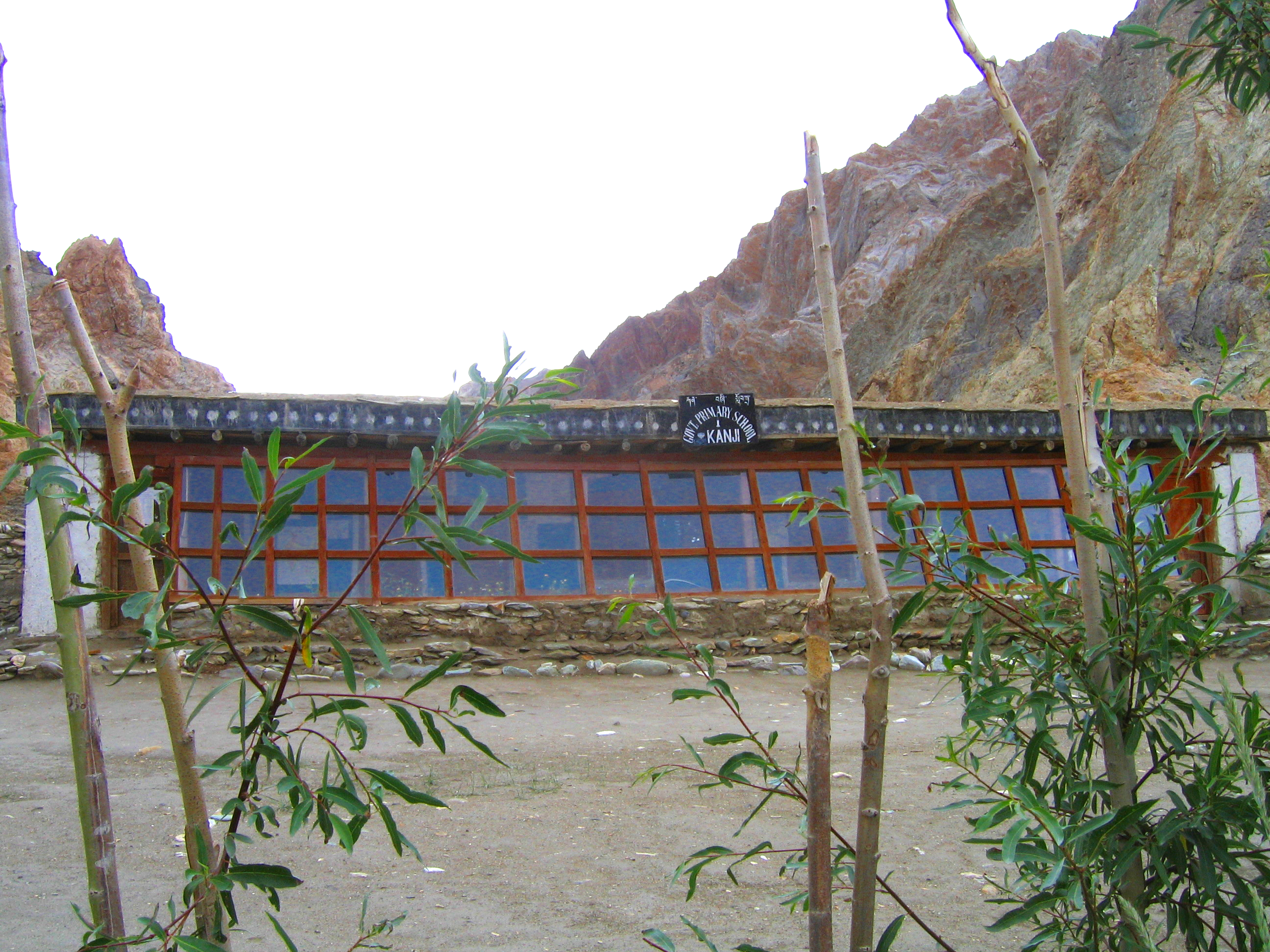
Primary school, Kanji

Kanji (also spelt Kanjee) is a village in the Sham district of the union territory of Ladakh in India. It is located in the Wanla tehsil, and can be accessed through the village of Heniskot which lies on the Srinagar-Kargil-Leh highway.

The village has a small number of families who farm the immediate area. The village is situated on an altitude of 3875 m, and is a campsite on the Kanji la and Shilakong gorge treks.

== Demographics ==
According to the 2011 census of India, Kanji has 52 households. The effective literacy rate (i.e. the literacy rate of population excluding children aged 6 and below) is 62.19%.

Demographics (2011 Census)
	Total	Male	Female
Population	325	165	160
Children aged below 6 years	42	20	22
Scheduled caste	0	0	0
Scheduled tribe	324	165	159
Literates	176	94	82
Workers (all)	139	74	65
Main workers (total)	138	74	64
Main workers: Cultivators	65	37	28
Main workers: Agricultural labourers	7	1	6
Main workers: Household industry workers	56	30	26
Main workers: Other	10	6	4
Marginal workers (total)	1	0	1
Marginal workers: Cultivators	0	0	0
Marginal workers: Agricultural labourers	0	0	0
Marginal workers: Household industry workers	0	0	0
Marginal workers: Others	1	0	1
Non-workers	186	91	95
