= Tia, Ladakh =

Tia
- Village
- Location in Ladakh#India Tia (India)
- Coordinates: 34.341362°N 76.974292°E
- Country: India
- Union Territory: Ladakh
- District: Sham
- Tehsil: Temisgam
- Executive: Councilor

Population (2011)
  - Total: 1,273
- Time zone: UTC+5:30 (IST)
- Census code: 942

Tia is a village in the Sham district of Ladakh, India. It is located in the Temisgam tehsil.

== Demographics ==
According to the 2011 census of India, Tia has 196 households. The effective literacy rate (i.e. the literacy rate of population excluding children aged 6 and below) is 70.2%.

Demographics (2011 Census)
	Total	Male	Female
Population	1273	591	682
Children aged below 6 years	132	68	64
Scheduled caste	1	1	0
Scheduled tribe	1261	587	674
Literates	801	395	406
Workers (all)	416	271	145
Main workers (total)	374	244	130
Main workers: Cultivators	149	80	69
Main workers: Agricultural labourers	0	0	0
Main workers: Household industry workers	5	5	0
Main workers: Other	220	159	61
Marginal workers (total)	42	27	15
Marginal workers: Cultivators	22	16	6
Marginal workers: Agricultural labourers	4	2	2
Marginal workers: Household industry workers	2	1	1
Marginal workers: Others	14	8	6
Non-workers	857	320	537
