= Saspochey =

Saspotsey Saspotsey
- Village
- Saspotsey
- Location in Ladakh, India Saspotsey (India)
- Coordinates: 34.3116964°N 77.1636148°E
- Country: India
- Union Territory: Ladakh
- District: Sham
- Tehsil: Saspol
- Elevation: 3,712 m (12,178 ft)

Population (2011)
  - Total: 214
- Time zone: UTC+5:30 (IST)
- 2011 census code: 949

Saspotsey is a village in the Sham district of Ladakh, India. It is located in the Saspol tehsil. One of the early period temples with paintings that may be dated to late 12th century is located here. The paintings are in a very bad state of preservation, with only two walls and a small portion of the remaining two walls having surviving paintings.

Wooden sculptures (possibly dating before 12th century CE) are also stored inside this temple.

== Ladakh Nature Centre ==
The Ladakh Nature Centre (LNC) at Saspotsey, the first nature interpretation centre in Ladakh, was inaugurated on 23 October, World Snow Leopard Day, 2026. The Centre has been developed by the Snow Leopard Conservancy India Trust (SLC-IT) with the support of the Royal Enfield Social Mission and the Ladakh Autonomous Hill Development Council (LAHDC), Leh.

== Demographics ==
According to the 2011 census of India, Saspotsey has 36 households. The effective literacy rate (i.e. the literacy rate of population excluding children aged 6 and below) is 75%.

Demographics (2011 Census)
	Total	Male	Female
Population	214	99	115
Children aged below 6 years	34	16	18
Scheduled caste	0	0	0
Scheduled tribe	214	99	115
Literates	135	74	61
Workers (all)	90	47	43
Main workers (total)	36	27	9
Main workers: Cultivators	0	0	0
Main workers: Agricultural labourers	0	0	0
Main workers: Household industry workers	0	0	0
Main workers: Other	36	27	9
Marginal workers (total)	54	20	34
Marginal workers: Cultivators	23	9	14
Marginal workers: Agricultural labourers	10	4	6
Marginal workers: Household industry workers	5	0	5
Marginal workers: Others	16	7	9
Non-workers	124	52	72

== Art Works ==
Paintings and Sculptures inside the temple at Saspotsey.

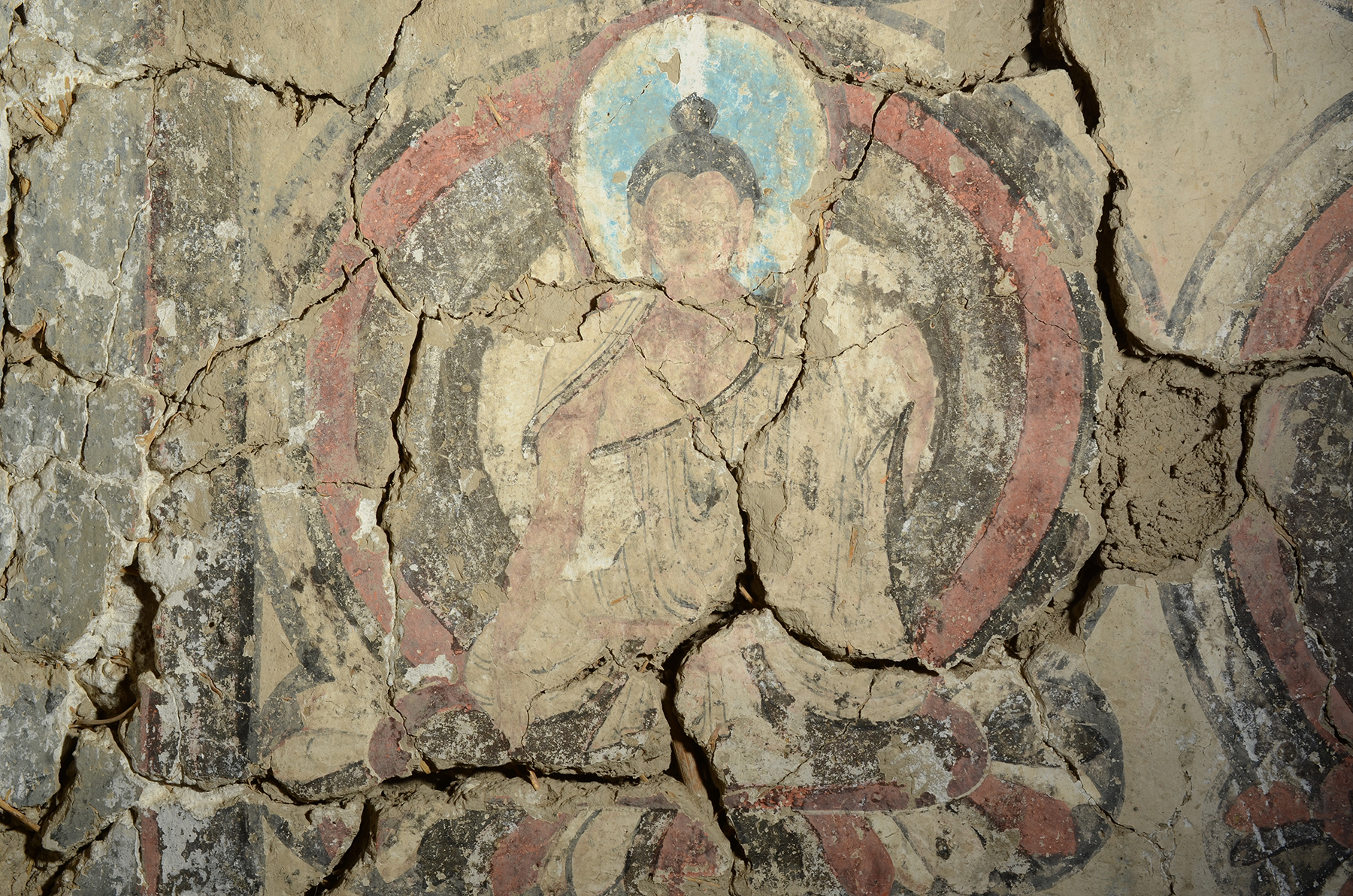
Painting 1

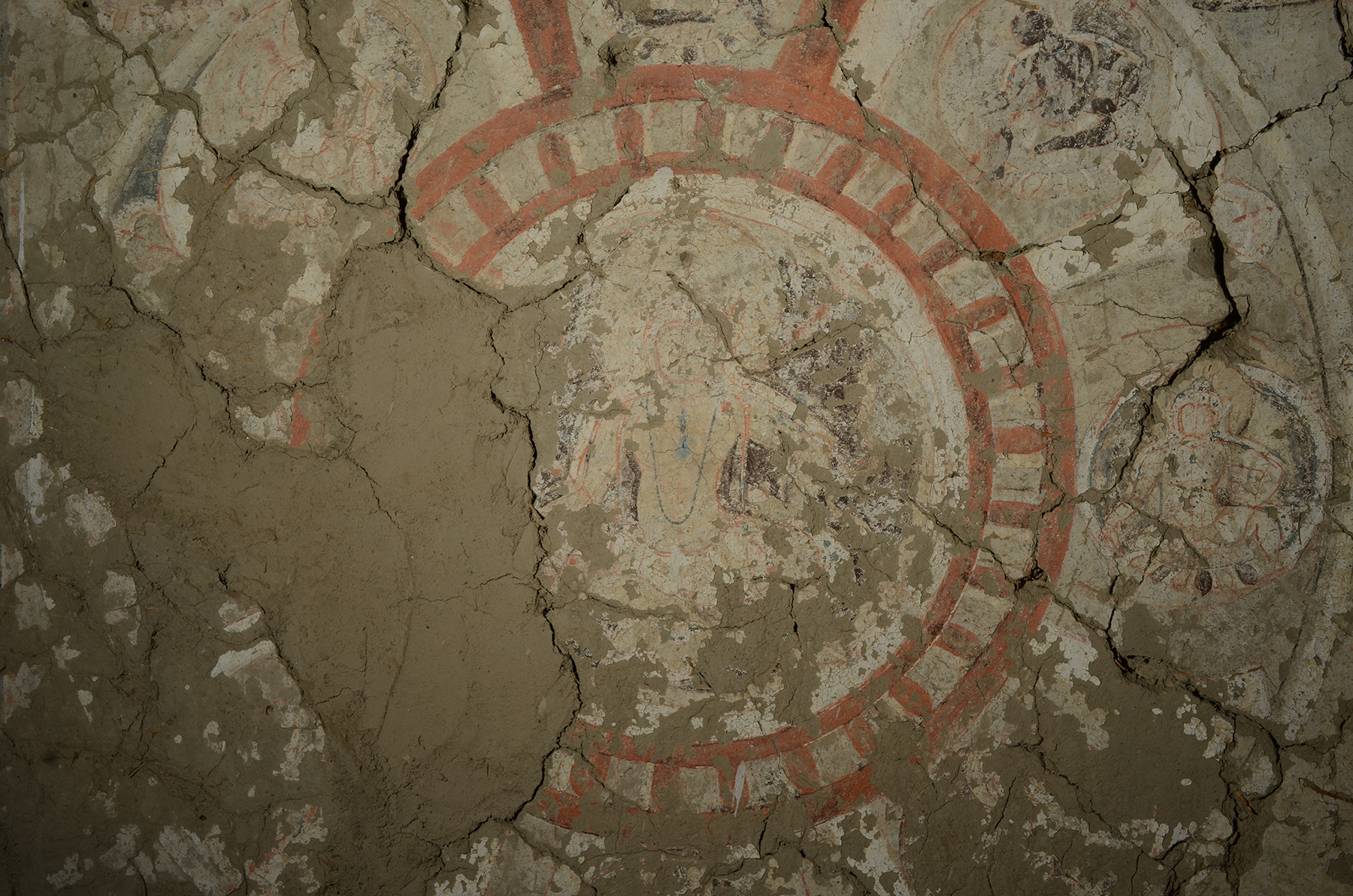
Painting2

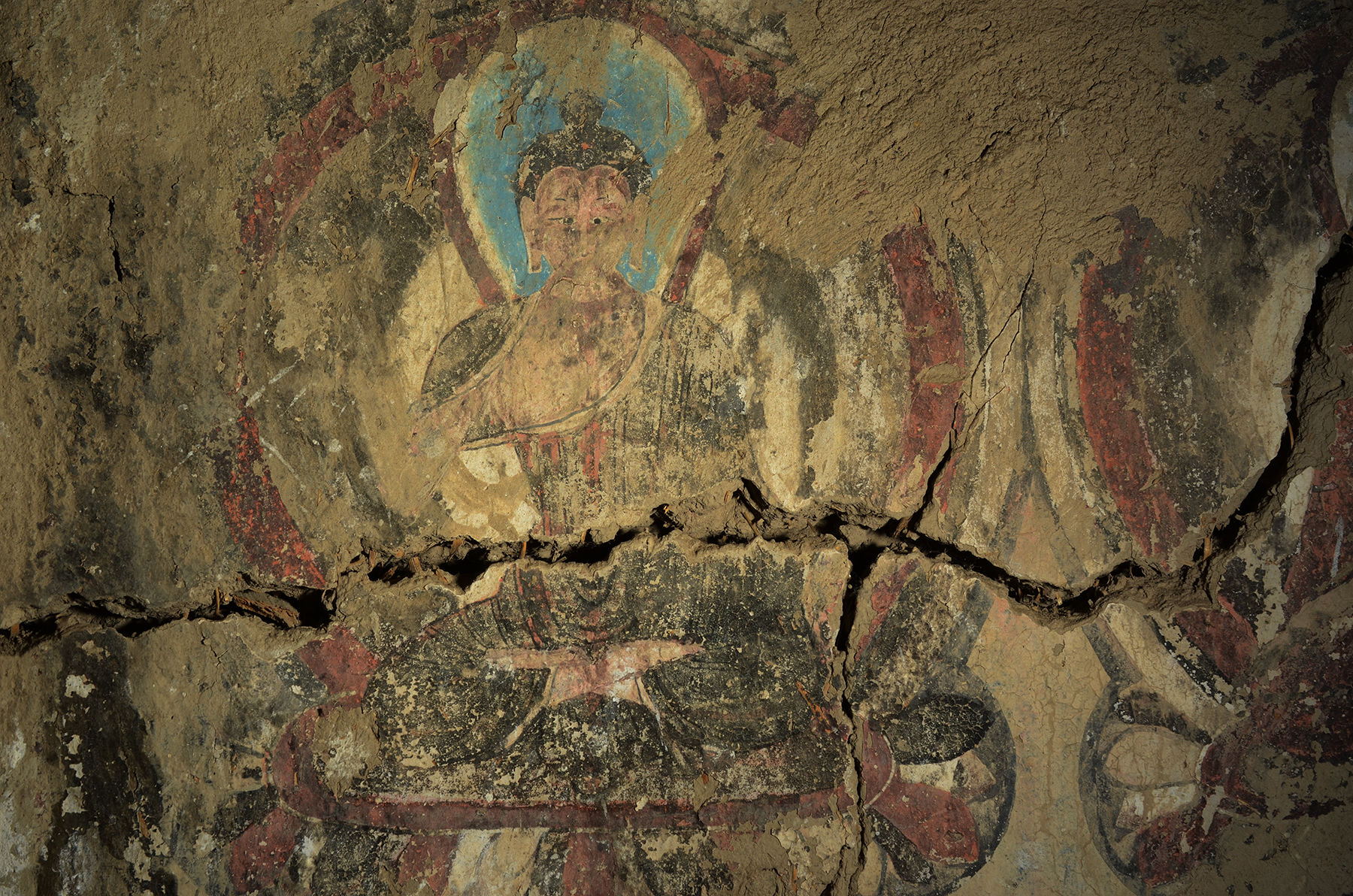
Painting 3

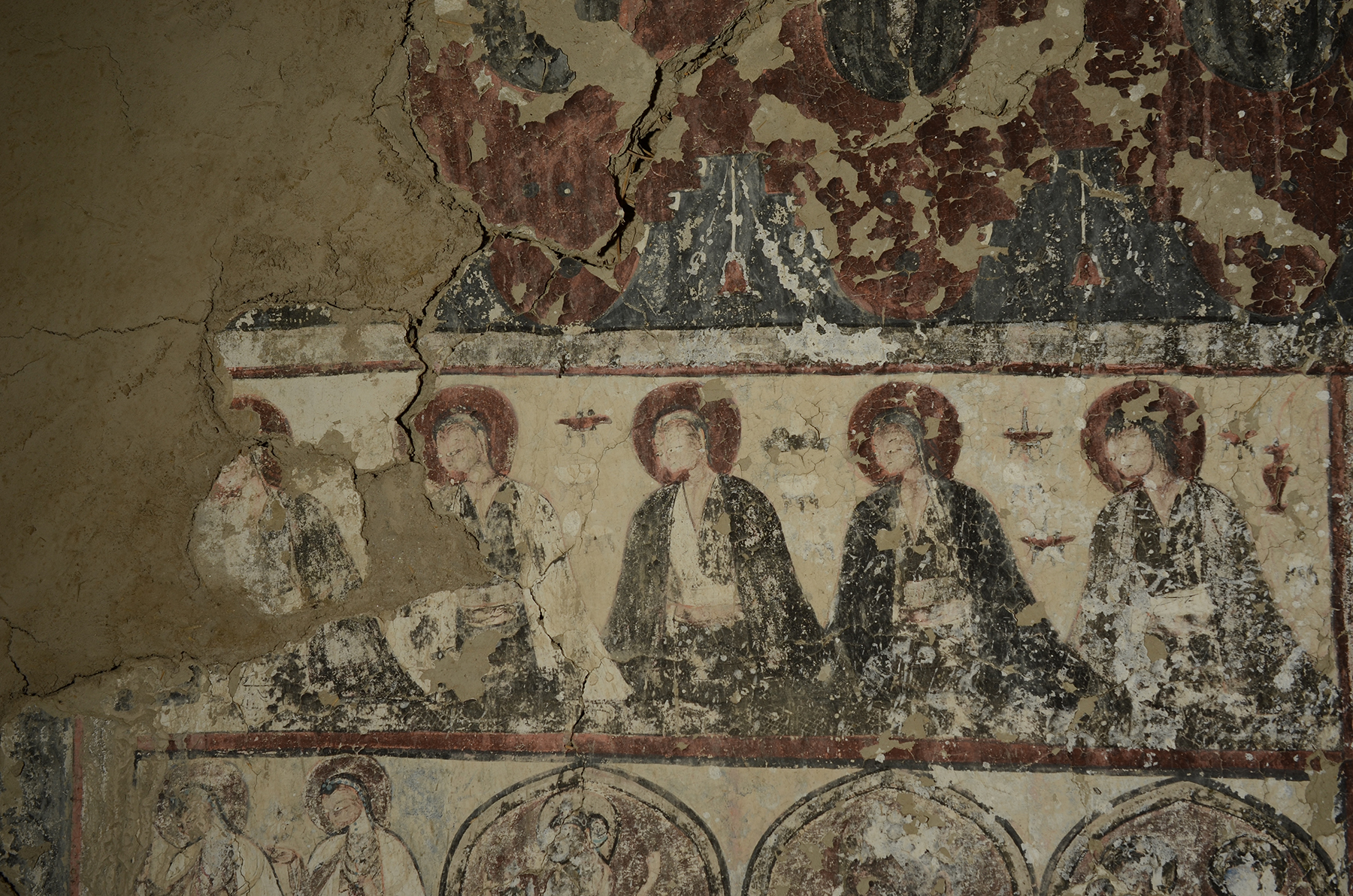
Painting 4
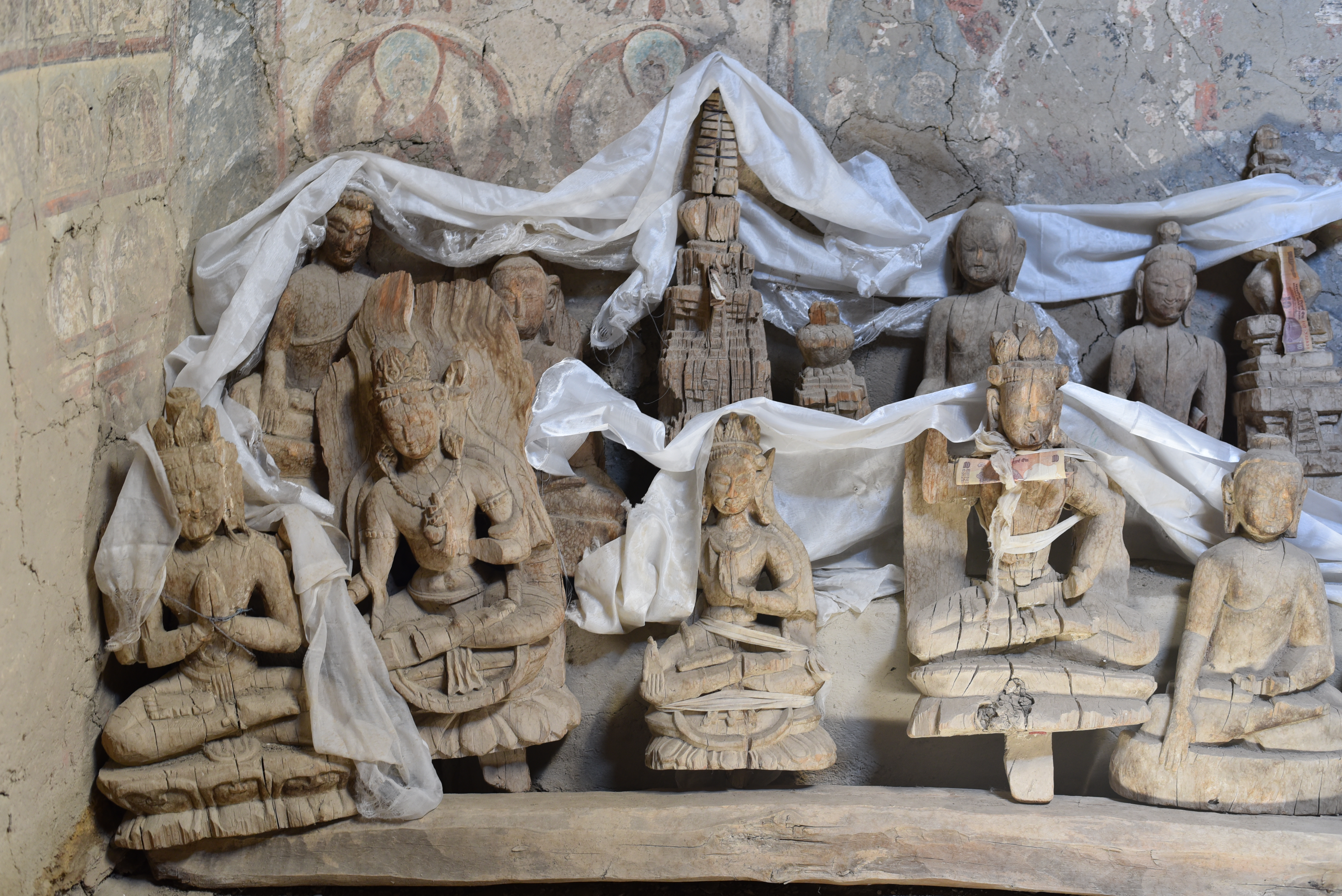
Sculptures 1

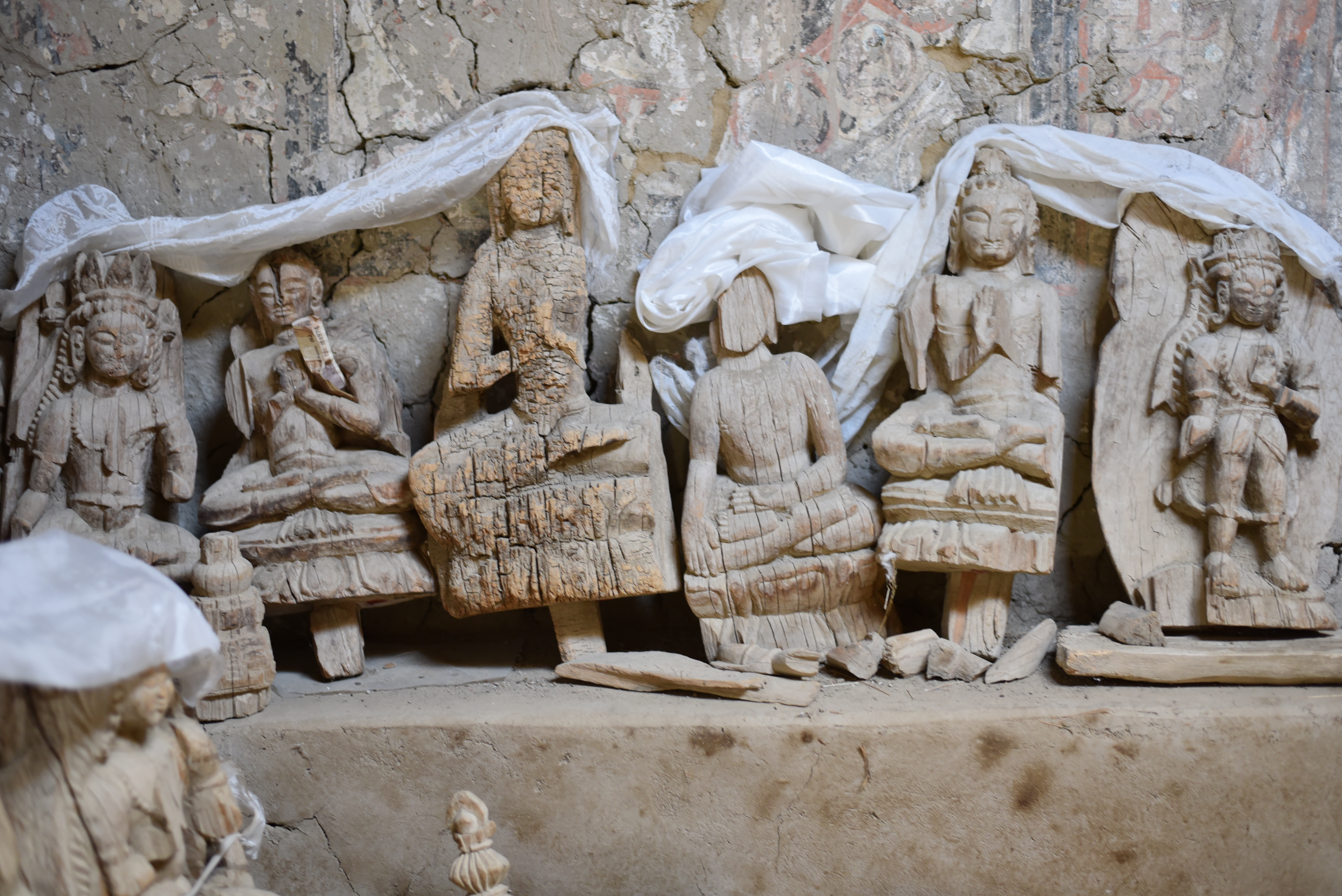
Sculptures 2
