= Bodhkharboo =

Bodhkharboo in Ladakh in India

Bodhkharboo Bodh Kharbu, Bodhkharbu
- Village
- Location within Ladakh Location within India
- Coordinates: 34.2122°N 76.2018°E
- Country: India
- Union territory: Ladakh
- District: Sham
- Tehsil: Wanla

Population
  - Total: 970
- Time zone: UTC+5:30 (IST)

Bodhkharboo (also spelled Bodh Kharbu or Bodh Kharboo) is a village in the Sham district of Ladakh, India.

== Demographics ==
According to the 2011 Census of India, Bodhkharboo recorded a total population of 970 across approximately 138 households.

Demographics of Bodhkharboo (2011 Census)
Parameter	Total	Male	Female
Population	970	501	469
Children (0–6 years)	113	56	57
Literacy Rate	72.82%	80.9%	64.08%
Scheduled Tribes	932	489	449

== See also ==
- Tourism in Ladakh
- Sham district
- Khaltsi
