= Nurla =

- Village
- Location in Ladakh, India Nurla (India)
- Coordinates: 34.3020314°N 76.9837477°E
- Country: India
- Union Territory: Ladakh
- District: Sham
- Tehsil: Temisgam
- Elevation: 3,041 m (9,977 ft)

Population (2011)
  - Total: 351
- Time zone: UTC+5:30 (IST)
- 2011 census code: 951

Nurla is a village in the Sham district of Ladakh, India. It is located in the Temisgam tehsil.

== Demographics ==
According to the 2011 census of India, Nurla has 52 households. The effective literacy rate (i.e. the literacy rate of population excluding children aged 6 and below) is 71.38%.

Demographics (2011 Census)
| | Total | Male | Female |
|---|---|---|---|
| Population | 351 | 168 | 183 |
| Children aged below 6 years | 33 | 17 | 16 |
| Scheduled caste | 0 | 0 | 0 |
| Scheduled tribe | 347 | 165 | 182 |
| Literates | 227 | 125 | 102 |
| Workers (all) | 204 | 100 | 104 |
| Main workers (total) | 72 | 37 | 35 |
| Main workers: Cultivators | 11 | 11 | 0 |
| Main workers: Agricultural labourers | 0 | 0 | 0 |
| Main workers: Household industry workers | 0 | 0 | 0 |
| Main workers: Other | 61 | 26 | 35 |
| Marginal workers (total) | 132 | 63 | 69 |
| Marginal workers: Cultivators | 83 | 26 | 57 |
| Marginal workers: Agricultural labourers | 8 | 1 | 7 |
| Marginal workers: Household industry workers | 2 | 2 | 0 |
| Marginal workers: Others | 39 | 34 | 5 |
| Non-workers | 147 | 68 | 79 |
