= Hemis (disambiguation) =

Hemis is a village in Kharu tehsil in the Leh district of Ladakh, India.

Hemis may also refer to:

- Hemis National Park, a national park in India
- HemisFair '68, a World's Fair held in San Antonio, Texas
- HemisFair Arena, an indoor arena in San Antonio, Texas
- Hemis Monastery, a Himalayan Buddhist monastery in Hemis, India
- Hemis Shukpachan, a village in the Likir tehsil in the Leh district of Ladakh, India

== See also ==
- Hermes (disambiguation)
- Hemiptera, order of insects
- Hemisphere, a line that divides the earth to equal halves
