= Tarhipti =

- Village
- Location in Ladakh, India Tarhipti (India)
- Coordinates: 34.241684°N 76.863632°E
- Country: India
- Union Territory: Ladakh
- District: Sham
- Tehsil: Temisgam

Population (2011)
  - Total: 102

Languages
  - Official: Hindi, English
- Time zone: UTC+5:30 (IST)
- Census code: 956

Tarhipti ot Tar Hipti is a village in the Sham district of Ladakh, India. It is located in the Temisgam tehsil.

== Demographics ==
According to the 2011 census of India, Tarhipti has 102 people, spread out into 20 households. The effective literacy rate (i.e. the literacy rate of population excluding children aged 6 and below) is 57.45%.

Demographics (2011 Census)
	Total	Male	Female
Population	102	56	46
Children aged below 6 years	8	7	1
Scheduled caste	0	0	0
Scheduled tribe	101	55	46
Literates	54	29	25
Workers (all)	57	30	27
Main workers (total)	35	29	6
Main workers: Cultivators	24	21	3
Main workers: Agricultural labourers	1	1	0
Main workers: Household industry workers	0	0	0
Main workers: Other	10	7	3
Marginal workers (total)	22	1	21
Marginal workers: Cultivators	22	1	21
Marginal workers: Agricultural labourers	0	0	0
Marginal workers: Household industry workers	0	0	0
Marginal workers: Others	0	0	0
Non-workers	45	26	19
