= Leido =

Leido Lehdho, Leh Dho
- Village
- Location in Ladakh, India Leido (India)
- Coordinates: 34.381487°N 76.691837°E
- Country: India
- Union Territory: Ladakh
- District: Sham
- Tehsil: Skurbuchan

Population (2011)
  - Total: 370
- Time zone: UTC+5:30 (IST)
- Census code: 945

Leido, also spelled Leh Dho and Lehdho, is a village in the Sham district of Ladakh, India. It is located in the Skurbuchan tehsil.

== Demographics ==
According to the 2011 census of India, Leido has 55 households. The effective literacy rate (i.e. the literacy rate of population excluding children aged 6 and below) is 73.89%.

Demographics (2011 Census)
	Total	Male	Female
Population	370	188	182
Children aged below 6 years	33	16	17
Scheduled caste	0	0	0
Scheduled tribe	344	173	171
Literates	249	144	105
Workers (all)	199	106	93
Main workers (total)	198	106	92
Main workers: Cultivators	153	74	79
Main workers: Agricultural labourers	8	5	3
Main workers: Household industry workers	0	0	0
Main workers: Other	37	27	10
Marginal workers (total)	1	0	1
Marginal workers: Cultivators	1	0	1
Marginal workers: Agricultural labourers	0	0	0
Marginal workers: Household industry workers	0	0	0
Marginal workers: Others	0	0	0
Non-workers	171	82	89
