= Hanu, Ladakh =

Hanu
- Village
- Location in Ladakh, India
- Coordinates: 34.591°N 76.623°E
- Country: India
- Union Territory: Ladakh
- District: Sham
- Tehsil: Aryan Valley
- Panchayat: Hanu

Population (2011)
  - Total: 1,207
- Time zone: UTC+5:30 (IST)
- Census code: 940

Hanu (also called Hanoo) is a village panchayat located in the Aryan Valley tehsil of Sham district, Ladakh, India. It is one of the main Brokpa villages in Ladakh. It falls within the Aryan valley Tehsil of Ladakh .It is in the valley of the Hanu stream that flows from the Chorbat La pass to drain into the Indus river.

== Geography ==
Hanu consists of three villages — Yogma Hanu (Lower Hanu), Goma Hanu (Upper Hanu) and Hanu Thang — which lie in the eponymous valley, running between the Chorbat La pass and the Indus River valley near Dah. The Hanu stream flows down the valley and joins the Indus at Hanu Thang . To the north of the Chorbat La pass, the Chorbat Lungpa river flows north to join the Shyok river near Hassanabad Chorbat.

== History ==
The Chorbat La pass is considered the traditional boundary between Baltistan and Ladakh. According to geographer Frederick Drew, the valleys of Chorbat Lungpa and Hanu constituted the main route from Baltistan to Ladakh in the past. The two villages Goma Hanu and Yogma Hanu are fortified, indicating that they experienced raids from Baltistan in the past.

== Demographics ==
According to the 2011 census of India, Hanoo has a population of 1207 across 224 households. The literacy rate is 47.69%.

== See also ==
- Dah
- Garkon
- Darchik
- Chulichan
