= Photoksar =

Fotoksar Photoksar
- Village
- Location in Ladakh, India Fotoksar (India)
- Coordinates: 34.073060°N 76.823723°E
- Country: India
- Union Territory: Ladakh
- District: Sham
- Tehsil: Wanla

Population (2011)
  - Total: 241
- Time zone: UTC+5:30 (IST)
- Census code: 960

Fotoksar or Photoksar is a village in the Sham district of Ladakh, India. It is located in the Wanla tehsil.

== Location ==
Fotoksar is around 165 kilometres (103 mi) from the nearest airport city of Leh. On the way towards Lamayuru monastery from Leh, a road left towards Wanla leaving the main Kargil-Leh highway, which goes further to Sirsir-La pass (4,760 metres (15,620 ft)) and then to Photoksar. The Sisir-La pass is open only in summers. So, in winter this village is cut off from the outside world.

== Demographics ==
According to the 2011 census of India, Fotoksar has 48 households. The effective literacy rate (i.e. the literacy rate of the population excluding children aged 6 and below) is 71.23%.

Demographics (2011 Census)
	Total	Male	Female
Population	241	119	122
Children aged below 6 years	29	13	16
Scheduled caste	0	0	0
Scheduled tribe	241	119	122
Literates	151	83	68
Workers (all)	120	62	58
Main workers (total)	60	58	2
Main workers: Cultivators	59	57	2
Main workers: Agricultural labourers	0	0	0
Main workers: Household industry workers	0	0	0
Main workers: Other	1	1	0
Marginal workers (total)	60	4	56
Marginal workers: Cultivators	57	4	53
Marginal workers: Agricultural labourers	0	0	0
Marginal workers: Household industry workers	3	0	3
Marginal workers: Others	0	0	0
Non-workers	121	57	64
