= Likir =

- Village
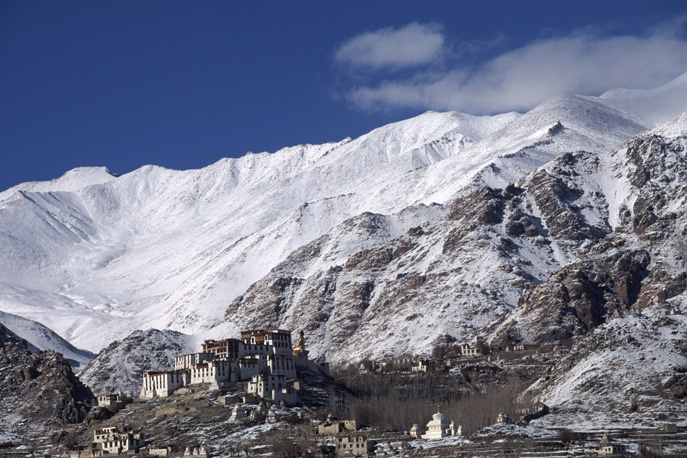
- Klu-kkhyil monastery

- Location in Ladakh, India Likir (India)
- Coordinates: 34.2903203°N 77.2132106°E
- Country: India
- Union Territory: Ladakh
- District: Sham
- Tehsil: Saspol
- Elevation: 3,651 m (11,978 ft)

Population (2011)
  - Total: 1,058

Languages
  - Official: Hindi, English
- Time zone: UTC+5:30 (IST)
- 2011 census code: 848

Likir is an emerging town located in Saspol tehsil in the Sham district of Ladakh, India. It is located in the Saspol tehsil, in the Ladakh region. Khalatse is a nearby trekking place.

It is famous for the nearby Klu-kkhyil (meaning "water spirits") gompa (Buddhist monastery). The Likir Monastery was first built in the 11th century and was rebuilt in the 18th century, and currently has a 25-foot-tall (7.6 m) gold-covered Buddha statue. It is occupied by monks of the Gelukpa order. It is located 52 km from Leh.

== Demographics ==
According to the 2011 census of India, Likir has 218 households. The effective literacy rate (i.e. the literacy rate of population excluding children aged 6 and below) is 72.93%.

Demographics (2011 Census)
	Total	Male	Female
Population	1058	573	485
Children aged below 6 years	105	57	48
Scheduled caste	0	0	0
Scheduled tribe	1056	572	484
Literates	695	432	263
Workers (all)	299	211	88
Main workers (total)	255	194	61
Main workers: Cultivators	141	122	19
Main workers: Agricultural labourers	20	16	4
Main workers: Household industry workers	3	3	0
Main workers: Other	91	53	38
Marginal workers (total)	44	17	27
Marginal workers: Cultivators	13	2	11
Marginal workers: Agricultural labourers	1	0	1
Marginal workers: Household industry workers	1	1	0
Marginal workers: Others	29	14	15
Non-workers	759	362	397
