= Alchi =

- Village
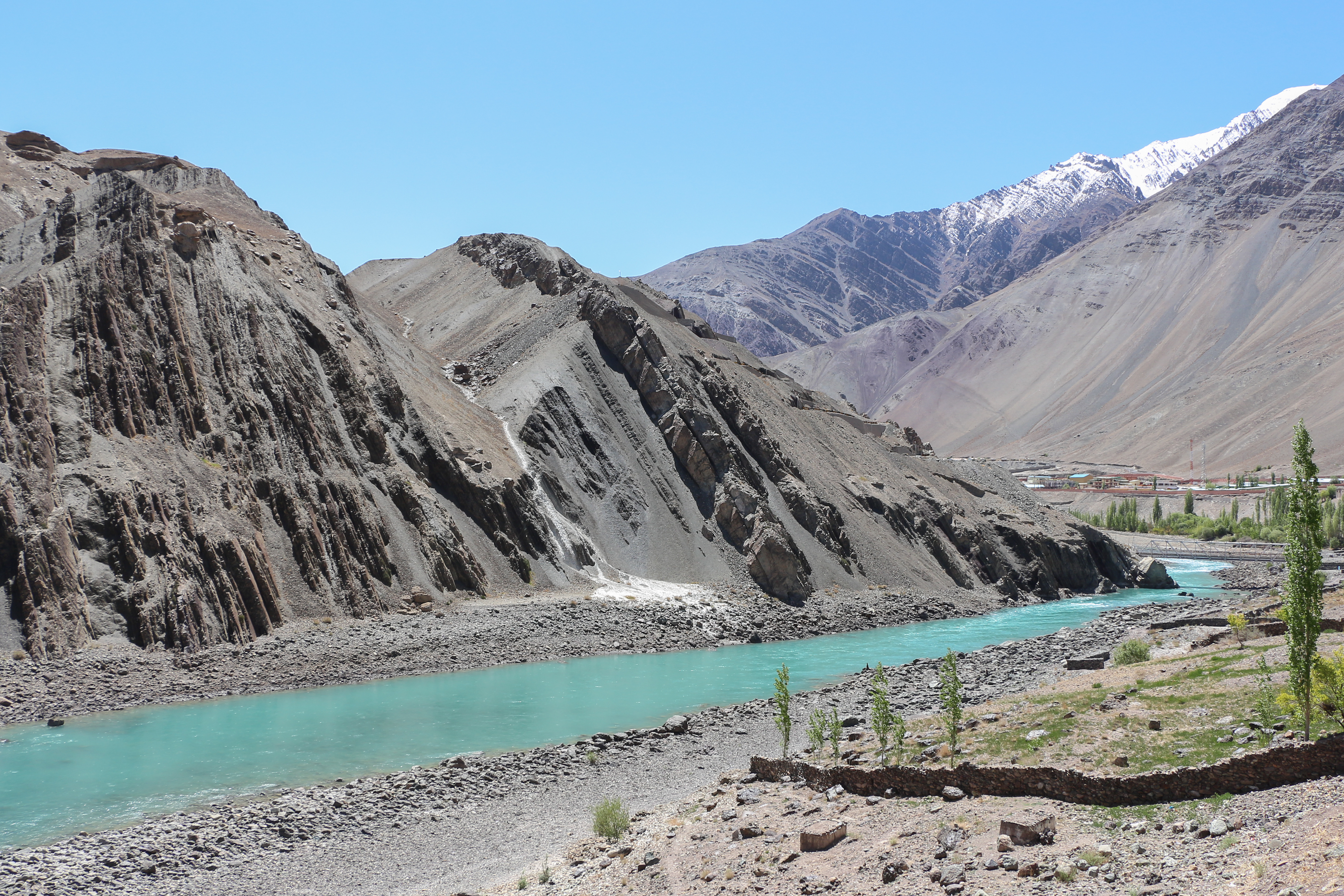
- The Indus River valley at Alchi

- Location in Ladakh, India Alchi (India)
- Coordinates: 34.2334°N 77.1625°E
- Country: India
- Union Territory: Ladakh
- District: Sham
- Tehsil: Saspol

Population (2011)
  - Total: 932

Languages
  - Official: Hindi, English
- Time zone: UTC+5:30 (IST)
- Census code: 953

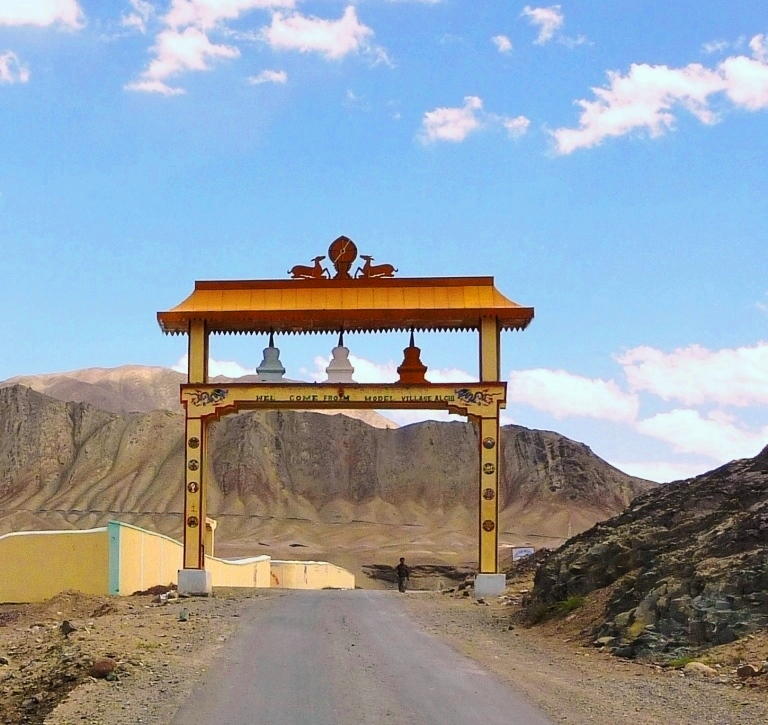
"Welcome from Model Village", Alchi, Ladakh. 2010

Alchi is a village in the Sham district of Ladakh, India. It is located in the Saspol tehsil, on the banks of the Indus River 70 km (43.49miles) downstream from the capital Leh. Unlike the other gompas in Ladakh, Alchi is situated on lowland, not on a hilltop.

The Alchi Monastery or Alchi Gompa lies about 65 km (40.3miles) from Leh on the banks of the Indus River.

== History ==
Alchi has long been distinguished by its isolation and rich heritage. In ancient times, access to the village was possible only via a hanging bridge made of ropes and sticks. To preserve their exclusivity, the villagers would often remove the bridge, deterring unwanted visitors. Those wishing to enter had to call out to the locals to lower the bridge, often waiting in patience while the residents delayed their response. This practice gave rise to the name Halchi from "Ha", the sound made in response, and "lchid", meaning heavy or late, marking the villagers as slow responders. Over time, the name evolved into Alchi, the form known today.

The village has one of the oldest monasteries in Ladakh (a national heritage) Alchi Monastery, mainly known for its magnificent and well-preserved 11th- or 12th-century wall paintings, all in an Indo-Himalayan style. The monastery houses thousands of rare and unique sculptures and paintings back to 11th-century Western Tibet.

== Demographics ==
According to the 2011 census of India, Alchi has 145 households. The effective literacy rate (i.e. the literacy rate of population excluding children aged 6 and below) is 72.51%.

Demographics (2011 Census)
	Total	Male	Female
Population	932	575	357
Children aged below 6 years	88	46	42
Scheduled caste	0	0	0
Scheduled tribe	712	355	357
Literates	612	422	190
Workers (all)	577	420	157
Main workers (total)	471	400	71
Main workers: Cultivators	118	99	19
Main workers: Agricultural labourers	18	4	14
Main workers: Household industry workers	1	0	1
Main workers: Other	334	297	37
Marginal workers (total)	106	20	86
Marginal workers: Cultivators	64	2	62
Marginal workers: Agricultural labourers	36	12	24
Marginal workers: Household industry workers	0	0	0
Marginal workers: Others	6	6	0
Non-workers	355	155	200

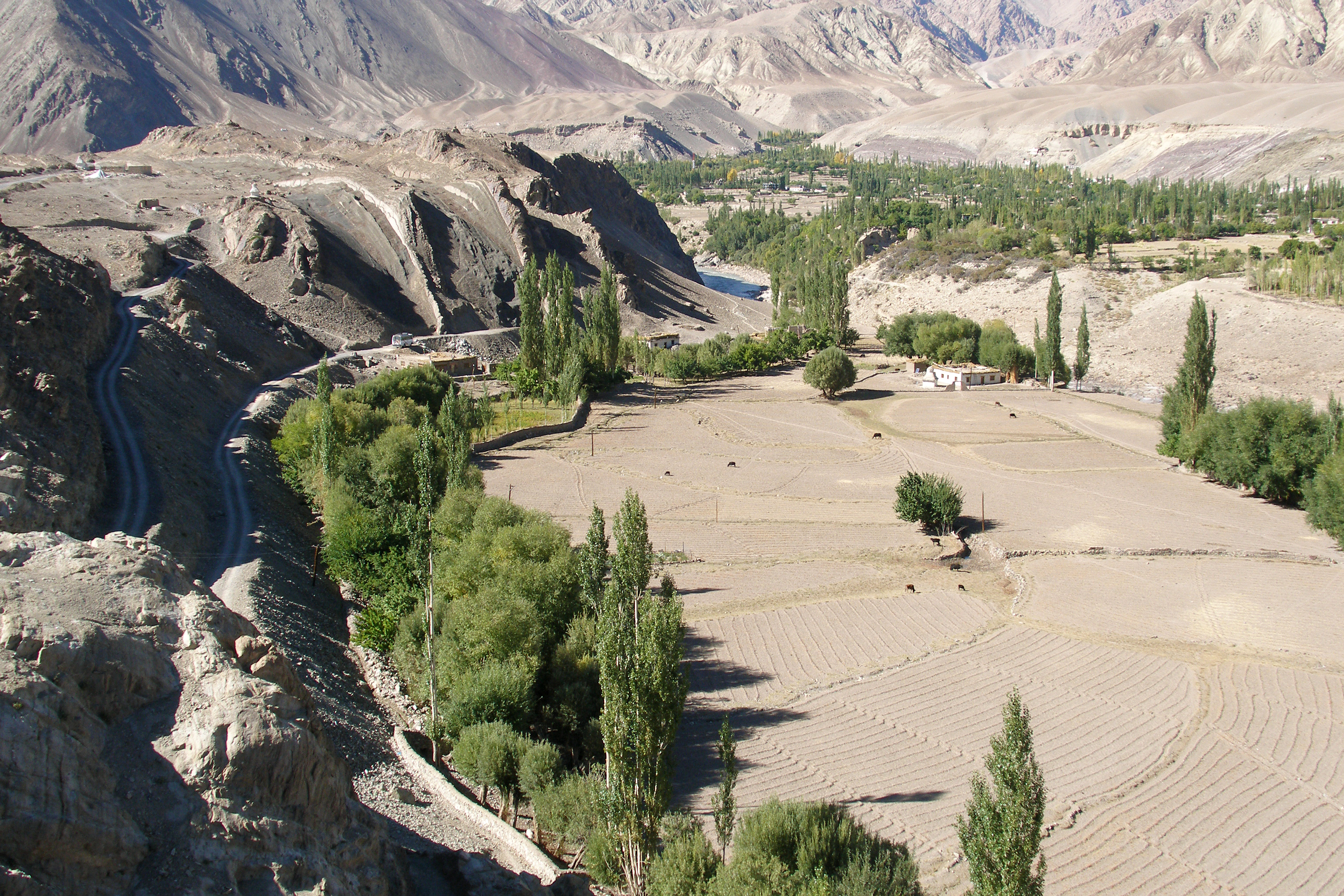
Alchi village, Ladakh

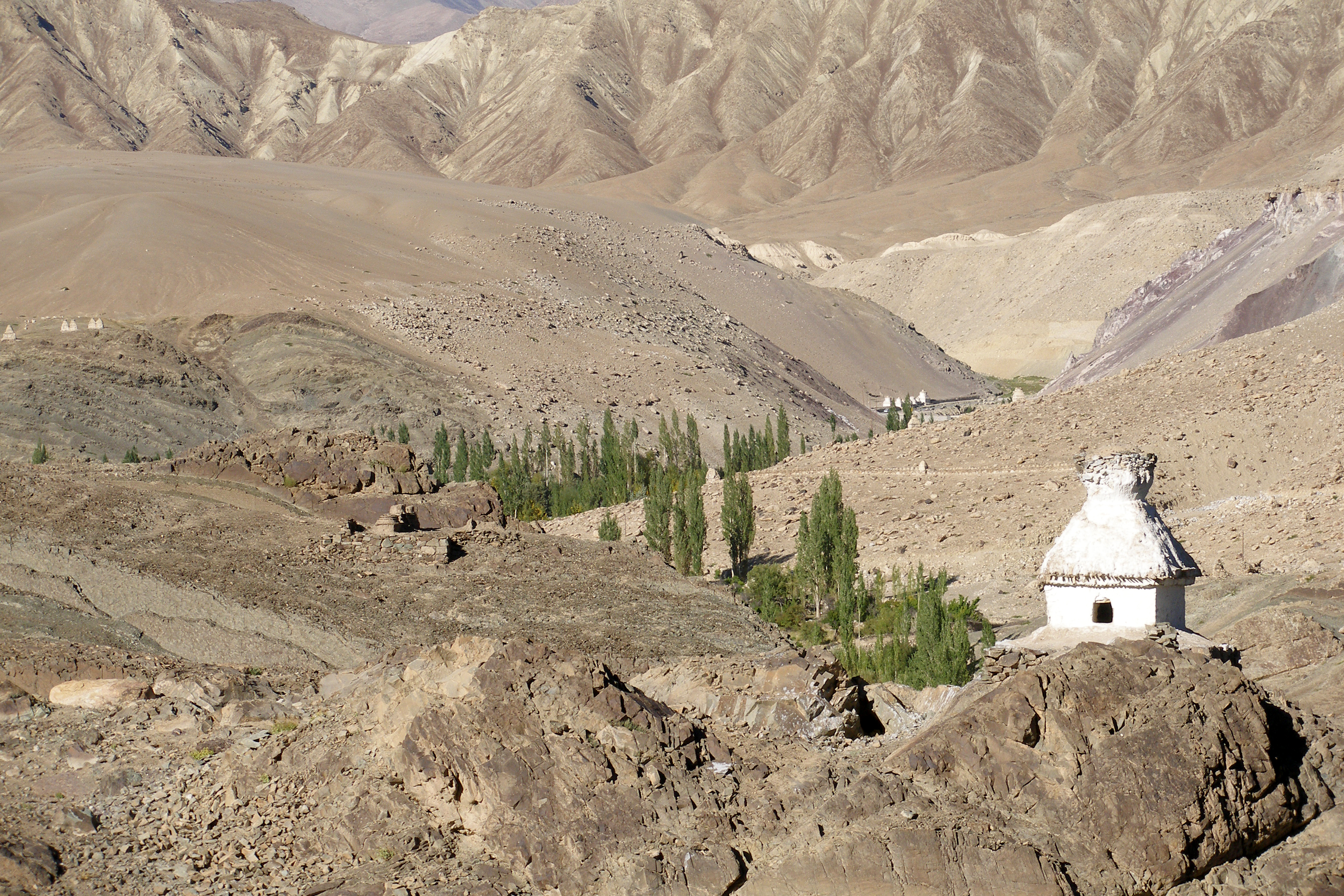
Chortens

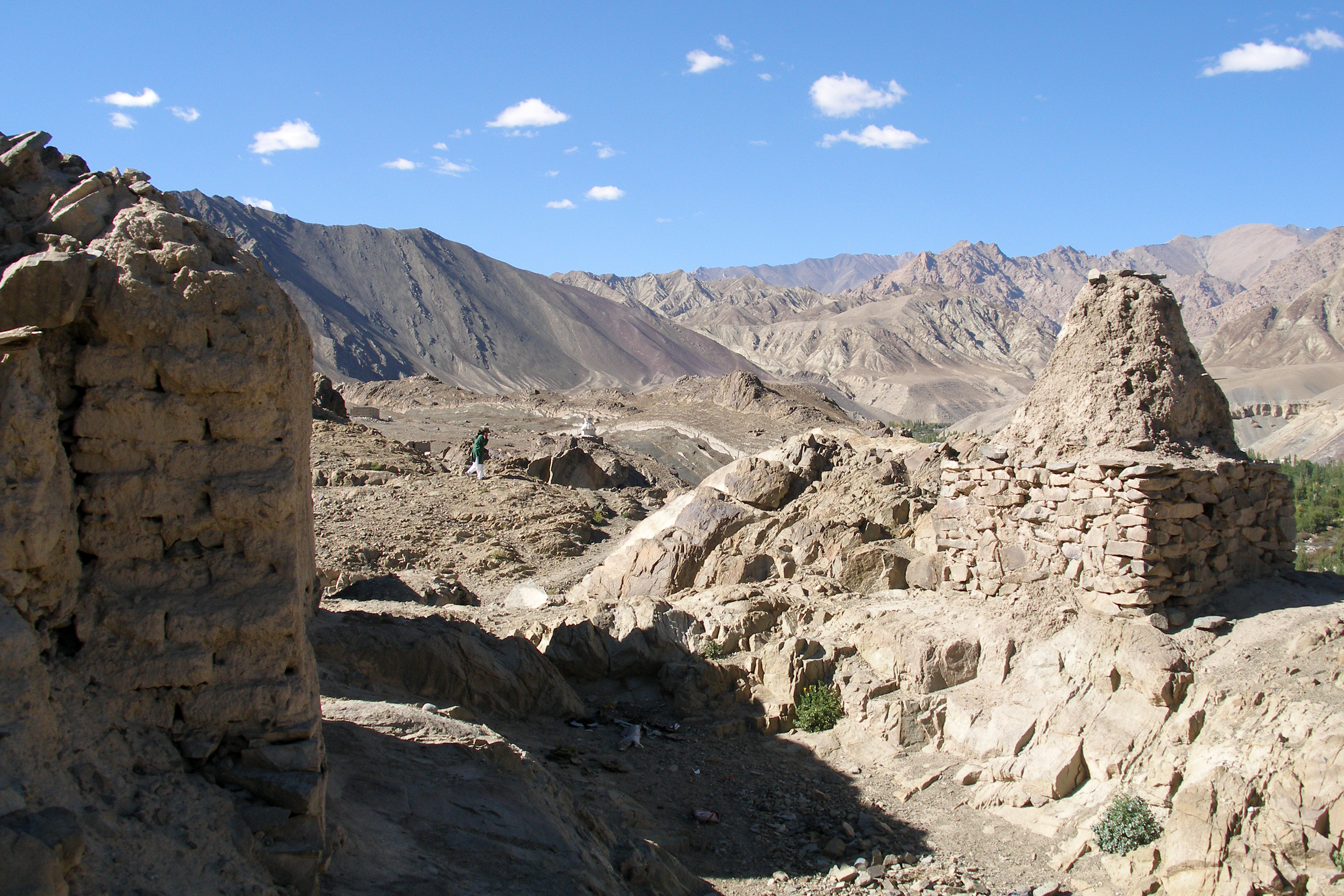
Chortens

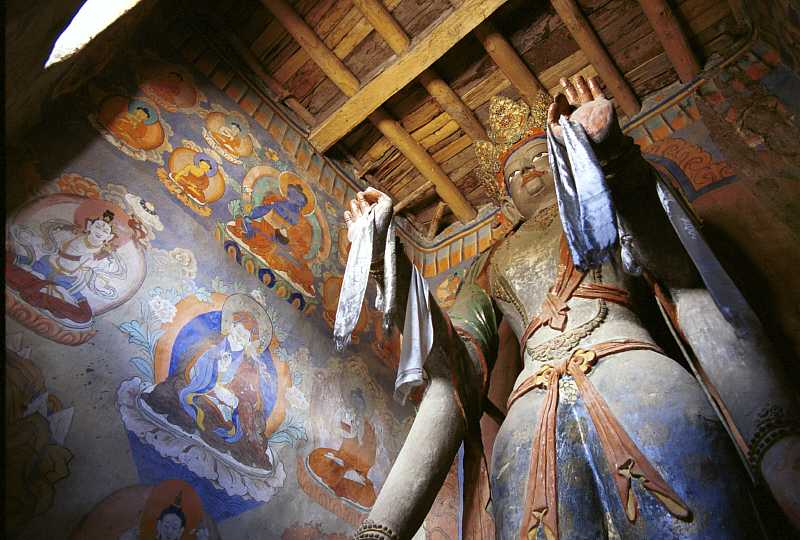
Image of Tara (Buddhism) in Ladakh

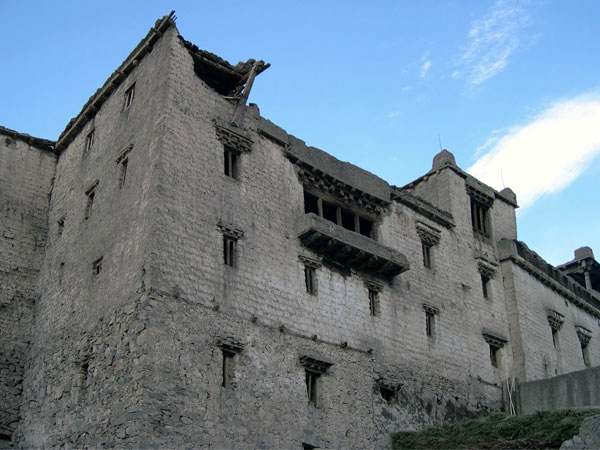
Palace of Sonam-Dorje
