= Tingmosgang =

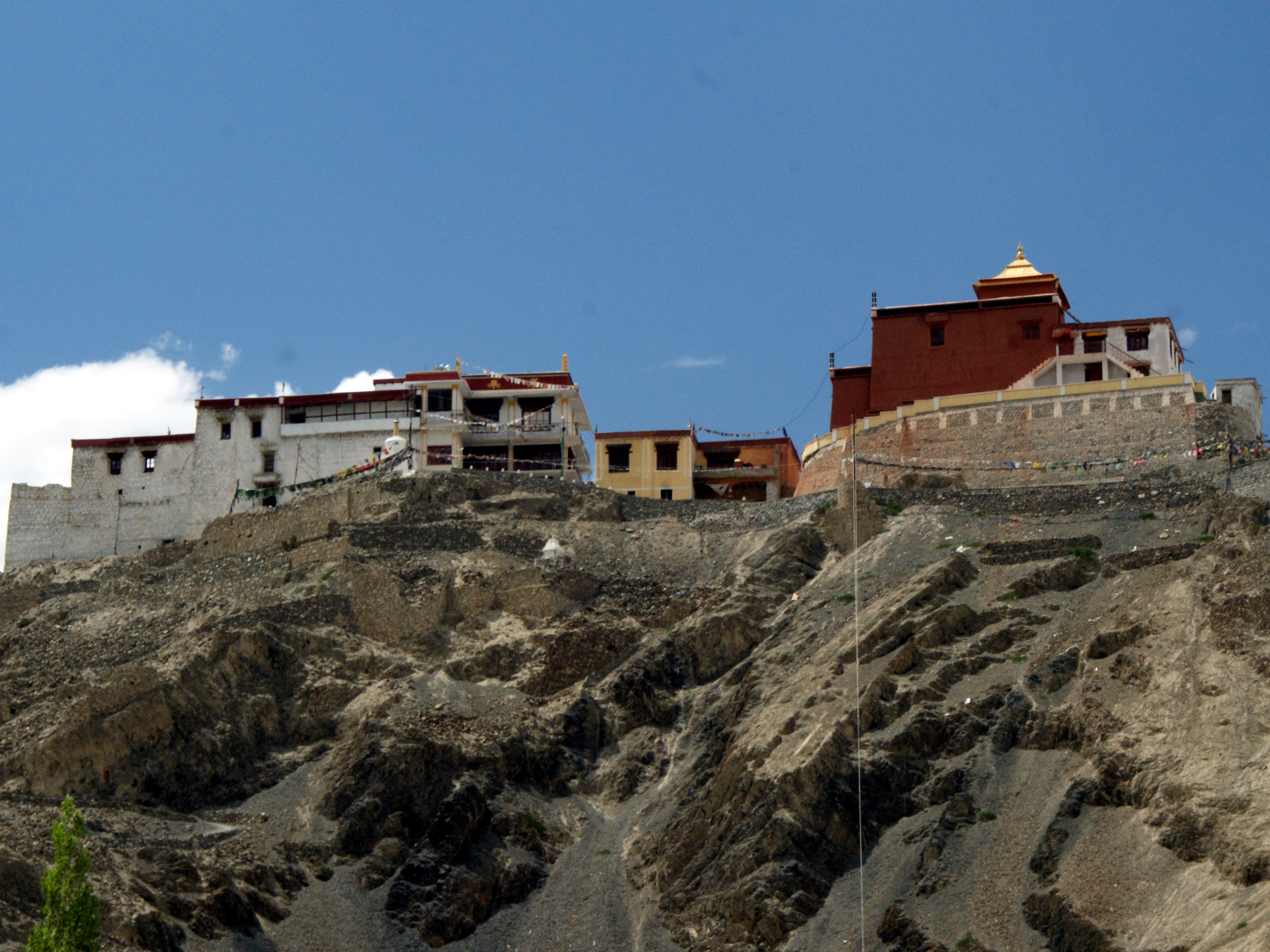
- Tingmosgang Monastery

- Location in Ladakh, India Tingmosgang (India)
- Coordinates: 34.322°N 76.988°E
- Country: India
- Union Territory: Ladakh
- District: Leh

Languages
  - Official: Ladakhi
- Time zone: UTC+5:30 (IST)

Tingmosgang (Note: Ladakhi: གཏིང་མོ་སྒང, romanized: gting mo sgang) is a fortress in Temisgam village, on the bank of the Indus River in Ladakh, in northwestern India. It is 92 km west of Leh, near Khalatse, and north of the present main road. The town has a palace and the monastery over a hillock.

== History ==
Tingmosgang was built by King Drag-pa-Bum as his capital in the 15th century. It is through his grandson Bhagan that Ladakh's second dynasty originated – Namgyals (Victorious) – which politically endured until the Dogra annexation in 1841 and whose lineage still lives on in the Stok Palace.

=== Treaty of Tingmosgang ===
Tingmosgang is significant from an historical point of view. After the death of the Fifth Dalai Lama, the regent ruling Tibet sent the head of the Drukpa order here as an emissary, and in 1684 the Treaty of Tingmosgang, sometimes called the Treaty of Temisgam, was signed between Ladakh and Tibet, ending the Tibet–Ladakh–Mughal War and demarcating the boundary between the two countries. The treaty also provided for Ladakh's exclusive right to trade in pashmina wool produced in Tibet, in exchange for brick-tea available from Ladakh. Ladakh was also bound to send periodic missions to Lhasa, carrying presents for the Dalai Lama.

Geographically, the Indus Valley is the back-bone of Ladakh, historically from Upshi down to Khaltse, it is Ladakh's heartland. All the main places associated with Ladakh's dynastic history – Shey, Leh, Basgo and Tingmosgang – together with all the important gompas, outside Zanskar, are situated along this stretch of the Indus River.

== See also ==
- Namgyal dynasty of Ladakh

== Bibliography ==
- Rizvi, Janet. 1996. Ladakh: Crossroads of High Asia. Second Edition. Oxford India Paperbacks. 3rd Impression 2001. ISBN 0-19-564546-4.
- http://www.tibetjustice.org/materials/treaties/treaties2.html
