= Skinlingyong =

Skinlingyong Skinding
- Village
- Location in Ladakh, India Skinlingyong (India)
- Coordinates: 34.323184°N 77.003032°E
- Country: India
- Union Territory: Ladakh
- District: Sham
- Tehsil: Khalsi

Population (2011)
  - Total: 237

Languages
  - Official: Hindi, English
- Time zone: UTC+5:30 (IST)
- Census code: 947

Skinlingyong (also called Skindiyang) is a village in the Sham district of Ladakh, India. It is located in the Khalsi tehsil.

== Demographics ==
According to the 2011 census of India, Skinlingyong has 38 households. The effective literacy rate (i.e. the literacy rate of population excluding children aged 6 and below) is 66.51%.

Demographics (2011 Census)
	Total	Male	Female
Population	237	122	115
Children aged below 6 years	28	11	17
Scheduled caste	0	0	0
Scheduled tribe	236	122	114
Literates	139	80	59
Workers (all)	93	50	43
Main workers (total)	92	49	43
Main workers: Cultivators	64	29	35
Main workers: Agricultural labourers	0	0	0
Main workers: Household industry workers	0	0	0
Main workers: Other	28	20	8
Marginal workers (total)	1	1	0
Marginal workers: Cultivators	0	0	0
Marginal workers: Agricultural labourers	0	0	0
Marginal workers: Household industry workers	0	0	0
Marginal workers: Others	1	1	0
Non-workers	144	72	72
