= Domkhar =

Domkhar Damkhar
- Village
- Location in Ladakh, India Domkhar (India)
- Coordinates: 34.331968°N 76.928472°E
- Country: India
- Union Territory: Ladakh
- District: Sham
- Tehsil: Khalsi

Population (2011)
  - Total: 1,202
- Time zone: UTC+5:30 (IST)
- Census code: 944

Domkhar (also spelt Damkhar) is a village in Sham district of Ladakh in India, located in the Khalsi tehsil.

The Domkhar Rock Art Sanctuary was created in 2012, in order to preserve prehistoric petroglyphs in the area.

== Demographics ==
According to the 2011 census of India, Damkhar has 199 households. The effective literacy rate (i.e. the literacy rate of population excluding children aged 6 and below) is 62.22%.

Demographics (2011 Census)
	Total	Male	Female
Population	1202	608	594
Children aged below 6 years	114	63	51
Scheduled caste	17	8	9
Scheduled tribe	1177	594	583
Literates	677	371	306
Workers (all)	650	357	293
Main workers (total)	604	336	268
Main workers: Cultivators	344	176	168
Main workers: Agricultural labourers	4	2	2
Main workers: Household industry workers	4	3	1
Main workers: Other	252	155	97
Marginal workers (total)	46	21	25
Marginal workers: Cultivators	9	5	4
Marginal workers: Agricultural labourers	2	1	1
Marginal workers: Household industry workers	1	0	1
Marginal workers: Others	34	15	19
Non-workers	552	251	301
