= Hemis Shukpachan =

Hemis Shukpachan Hemisshukpachan, Hemishok Pachan
- Village
- Location in Ladakh, India Hemis Shukpachan (India)
- Coordinates: 34.313807°N 77.076387°E
- Country: India
- Union Territory: Ladakh
- District: Sham
- Tehsil: Saspol

Population (2011)
  - Total: 739
- Time zone: UTC+5:30 (IST)
- PIN: 194106
- STD Code: 01982
- Census code: 950

Hemis-Shukpachan or Hemishok Pachan is a village in the Sham district of Ladakh, India. It is located on the right side bank of Indus River and is in the Saspol tehsil. Alternative transliterations of the village's name include Hemmis Shyk Pachan and Hemis Shukpachan.

== Demographics ==
According to the 2011 census of India, Hemis Shukpachan has 144 households. The effective literacy rate (i.e. the literacy rate of population excluding children aged 6 and below) is 65.62%.

Demographics (2011 Census)
	Total	Male	Female
Population	739	351	388
Children aged below 6 years	70	30	40
Scheduled caste	0	0	0
Scheduled tribe	734	349	385
Literates	439	238	201
Workers (all)	271	186	85
Main workers (total)	177	120	57
Main workers: Cultivators	28	25	3
Main workers: Agricultural labourers	2	2	0
Main workers: Household industry workers	2	0	2
Main workers: Other	145	93	52
Marginal workers (total)	94	66	28
Marginal workers: Cultivators	71	56	15
Marginal workers: Agricultural labourers	4	1	3
Marginal workers: Household industry workers	8	0	8
Marginal workers: Others	11	9	2
Non-workers	468	165	303
