= Saspol Caves =

Painted cave temples

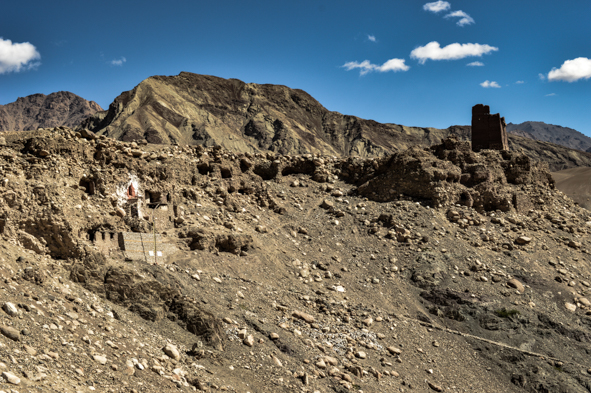
- Saspol Caves

- Location in Leh District of Ladakh

Religion
- Affiliation: Tibetan Buddhism

Location
- Location: Saspol Caves, Leh District, Ladakh, India
- Interactive map of Saspol Caves
- Coordinates: 34°15′N 77°9′E

Saspol Caves (a.k.a. Gon-Nila-Phuk Cave Temples) are situated in the hills behind Suspol, Ladakh, India, which is about 76 km from the city centre of Leh. Paintings exist in five caves, two of them extensively damaged. One of the painted caves, that have been given a coat of lime wash and red paint in the exterior is the most visited and is considered as the main cave. The paintings of Anuttarayoga Tantra (also known as Yoganiruttaratantra) in the main cave are very rare for the period of execution. These caves are under the administration of Likir Monastery.

== Dating the era ==
Very few early painted cave temples exist in Ladakh and these paintings date to the late 14th/15th century CE.

== Preservation status ==
The caves, also known as Gon-Nila-Phuk Cave temples, are in danger of total collapse and were therefore listed in 2016 World Monuments Watch. Rammed earth fortifications can be seen on top of the hill near the caves.

== Conservation ==
Art and architectural conservation projects were carried out by the INTACH Ladakh Chapter in 2015 and 2016 in collaboration with M/s Art Conservation Solutions. The project was funded in 2015 by the Prince Claus Fund and in 2016 and 2018 by the World Monuments Fund.

== Gallery ==
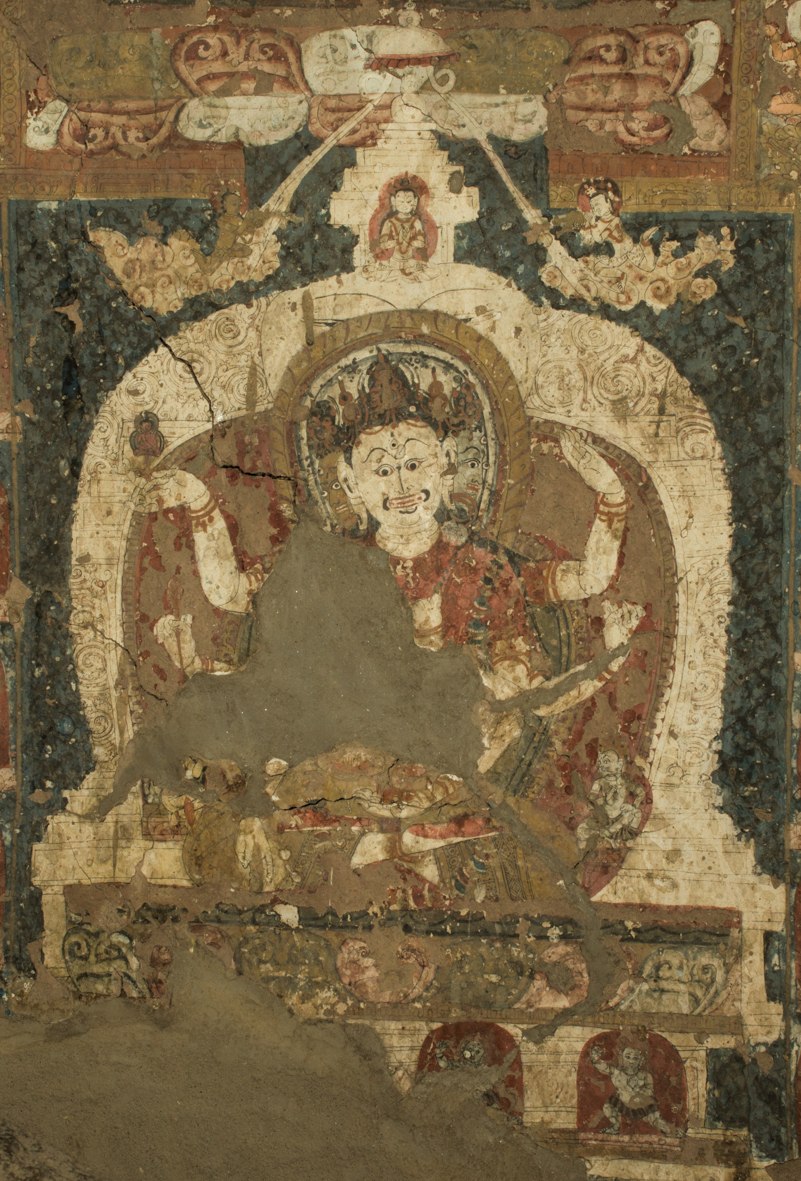
Ushnishavijaya

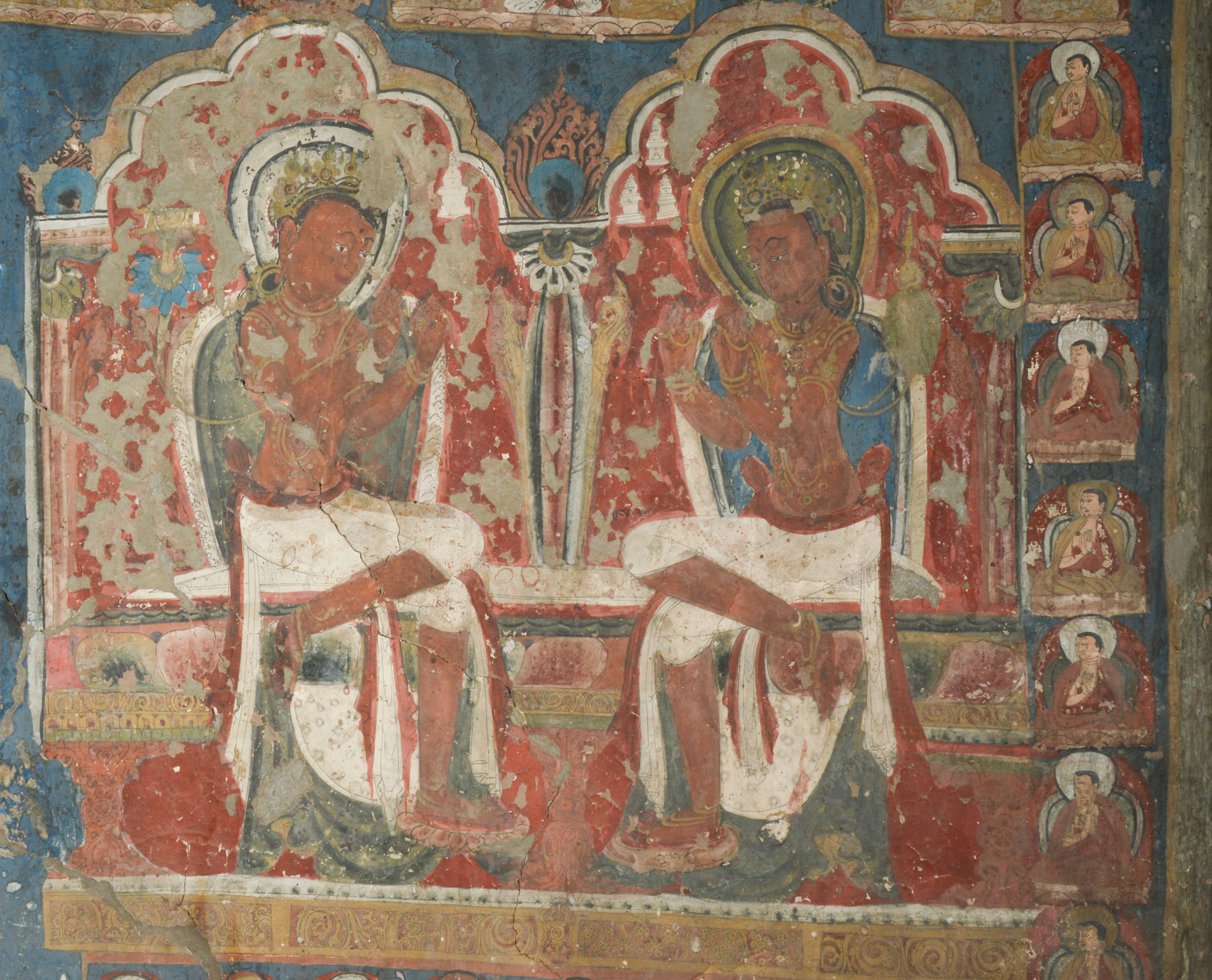
Manjushri and Maitreya

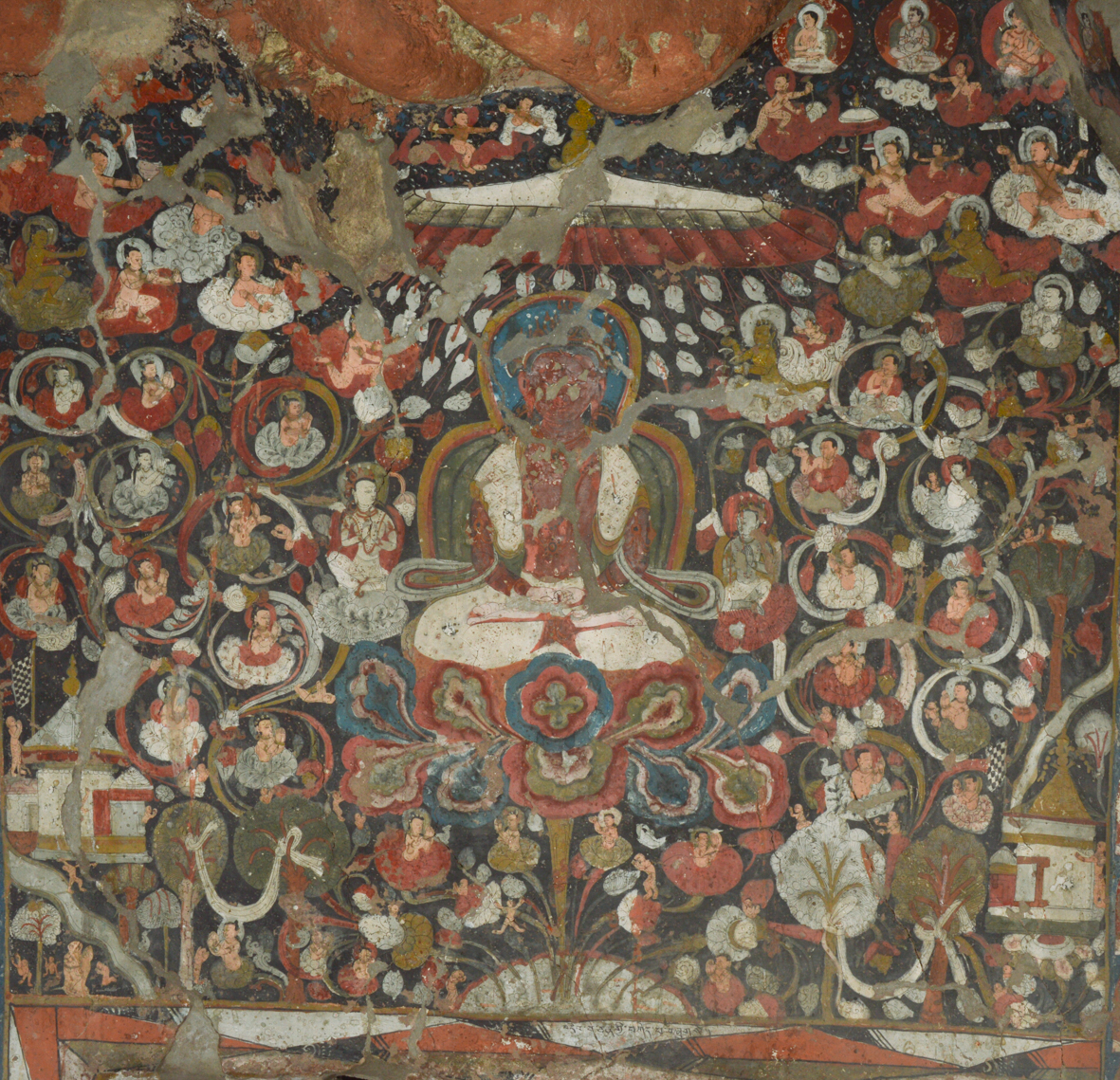
Amitabha in Sukhavati

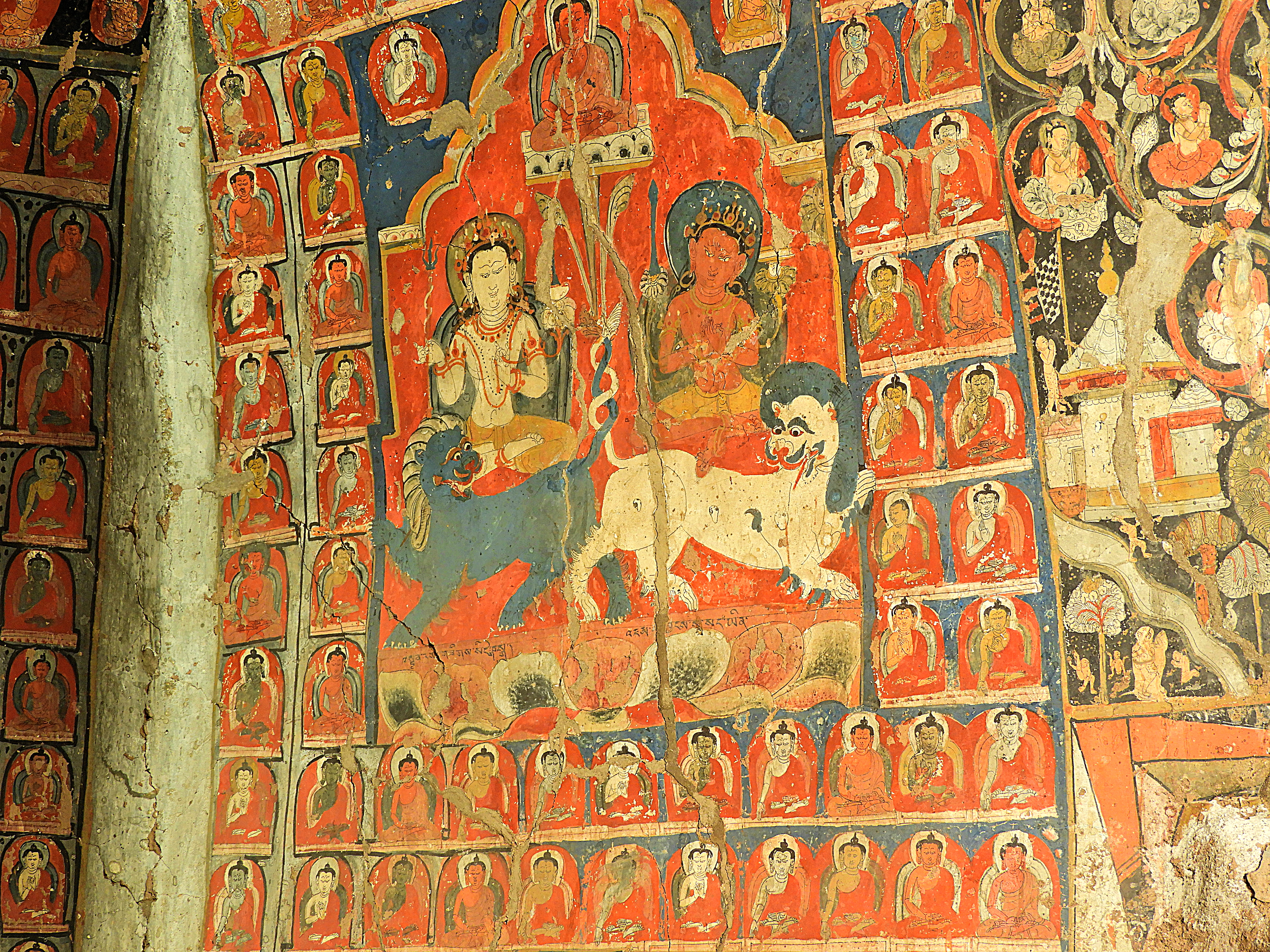

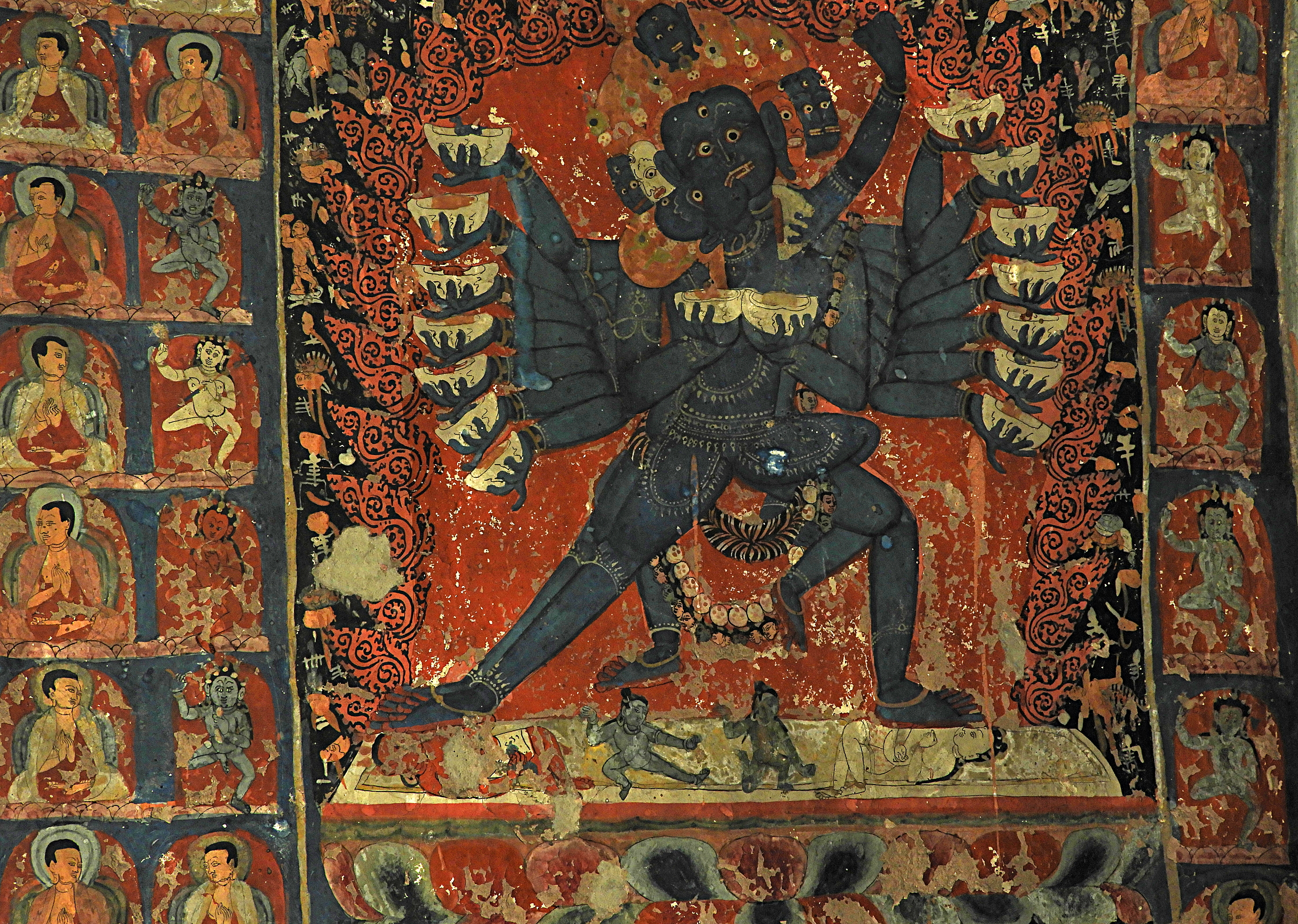
Hevajra

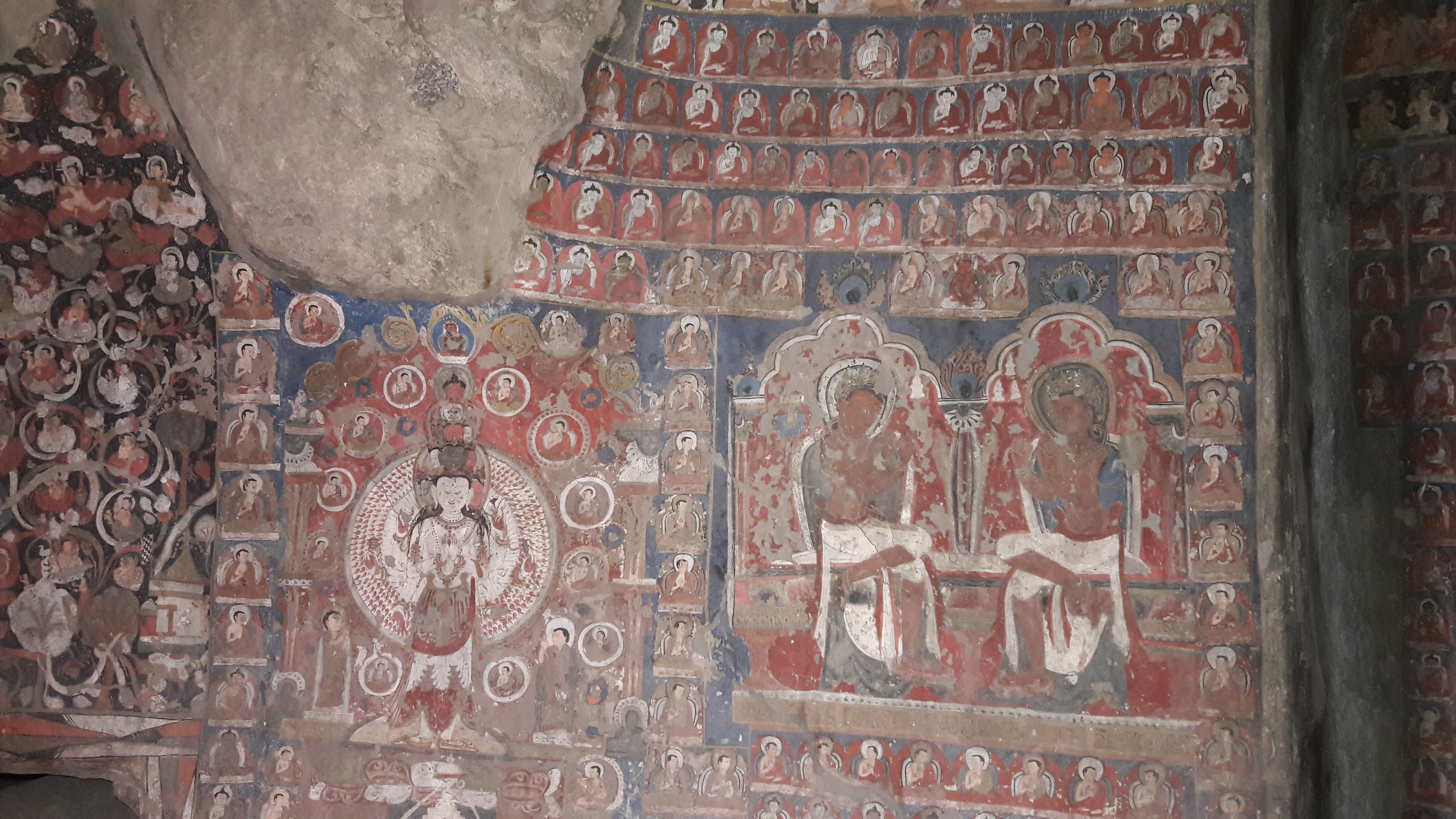
Avalokiteshwara painting and Manjushri & Maitreya painting

== See also ==
Tourism infrastructure

- Tourism in Ladakh
- Geography of Ladakh
- India-China Border Roads
- List of districts of Ladakh
- Siachen Base Camp (India)

Borders

- Actual Ground Position Line (AGPL), India-Pakistan border across Siachen region
- Line of Actual Control (LAC), India-China border across Ladakh
- Line of Control (LoC), India-Pakistan border across Ladakh and Jammu and Kashmir

Conflicts

- Sino-Indian War
- Indo-Pakistani wars and conflicts
- Siachen conflict
- Siachen Glacier
