= Sham district =

District in Ladakh, India, established in 2026

- District of Ladakh
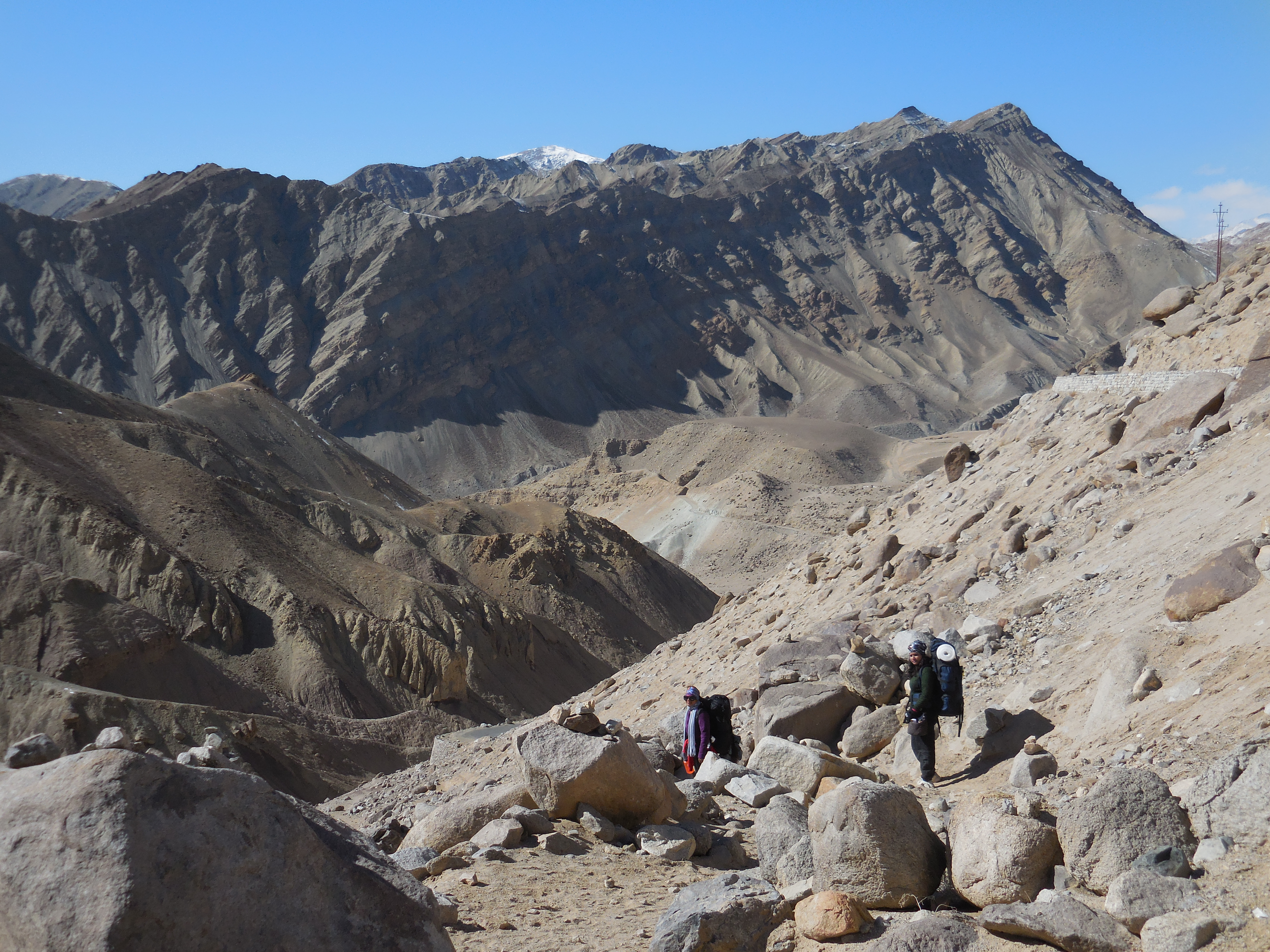
- View of Sham Valley
- Interactive map of Sham district
- Coordinates: 34°19′N 76°53′E
- Country: India
- Union Territory: Ladakh
- Headquarter: Khaltse
- Established: 27 April 2026

Government
  - Deputy Commissioner: Sh. Kunzes Angmo JKAS
  - Lok Sabha constituencies: Ladakh
  - MP: Mohmad Haneefa

Area
  - Total: 11,000 km^{2} (4,200 sq mi)

Population (2011)
  - Total: 33,000

Languages
  - Official: Hindi, English, Ladakhi, Urdu and Purgi
  - Spoken: Shina, Balti, Tibetan
- Time zone: UTC+05:30 (IST)

Sham district, with headquarter at Khalatse, is a district in Ladakh in India, established in April 2026.

== Etymology ==
The word "Sham" in the native dialect means "west," signaling where it is situated in Ladakh.

== History ==
=== Maryul kingdom ===
Until its absorption into the Maryul kingdom during the 10th century, Brokpa chiefs wielded nominal autonomy in the region.

=== Formation of new district ===
Earlier announced on 26th August 2024 as a new district was awaiting the formal notification for the creation. On 27th April 2026, 5 new districts were notified in the government gazette for boosting the service delivery and infrastructure, including Sham district with 27 revenue villages.

== Administration ==
Sham district, with district headquarter at Khalatse, entails the Sham Valley and Aryan Valley. Within Sham Valley, Alchi, Likir, Lamayuru, Hemis Shukpachan, Temisgam, and Uleytokpo has key habitations. Aryan Valley has Dah , Hanu.

Sub–divisions, Blocks and Villages in Sham district
Current district	Sub-Division	Tehsil	Blocks	Villages
Sham district	Khaltsi	Khaltsi	Khaltsi	Khaltsi, Takmachik, Skindiyang, Domkhar
Sham district	Khaltsi	Temisgam	Temisgam	Temisgam, Tia, Nurla, Tar Hipti
Sham district	Khaltsi	Wanla	Wanla	Wanla, Kanjee, Lamayuru, Fotoksar, Bodhkharboo, Haniskote
Sham district	Khaltsi	Skurbuchan	Skurbuchan	Skurbuchan, Kukshow, Lehdo
Sham district	Khaltsi	Aryan Valley	Dha Bema	Dha Bema, Garkone, Hanu, Darchiks
Sham district	Likir			
Sham district	Likir	Saspol	Saspol	Suspol, Hemisshukpachan, Alchi, Saspochay, Likir, Gaira-Mangnu
Total	2	6	6	27

== Demographics ==
Based on aggregation of the village-level data from the 2011 Census of India for the areas constituting the present district, Sham had an estimated population of about 33,000. The district is predominantly rural and sparsely populated.

Sham is a Buddhist majority district.

== Politics ==
=== Parliamentary Constituency ===
The district falls under Ladakh Lok Sabha constituency. The present Member of Parliament (MP) of Ladakh is Mohmad Haneefa (independent candidate).

=== Autonomous Hill Council ===
Sham District is administered by an elected body known as the Ladakh Autonomous Hill Development Council, Sham. The LAHDC was established in 2026.

== People ==
It is inhabited by Brokpa ethnolinguistic people of Dardic origin.

== Tourism ==
=== Aryan Valley ===
The Aryan valley is popular for its old Aryan culture and custom and the valley has abundance of apricot orchards and grapes. Aryan Valley, historically known as Dah Hanu region, is an area comprising four village clusters — Dah, Hanu, Garkon and Darchik.

Aryan Valley Apricot Blossom Festival (locally known as Chuli Mendok) is a 9-days long annual spring celebration held every year usually within first two weeks of April, though dates vary slightly every year as they are tied to the natural blooming cycle of the trees, which is influenced by winter snowfall and spring temperatures, the exact festival schedule is announced annually by the Ladakh Tourism Department to align with the blossoms. The official festival typically lasts about 9 days, though the entire blossoming window across the region's different altitudes can stretch from late March to early May. Lower altitude areas like the Aryan and Sham Valleys bloom first (early to mid-April), while higher regions near Leh and parts of Nubra bloom later (mid to late April). The festival is a vibrant display of the unique Brokpa community's traditions, including their in traditional attire (featuring elaborate floral headgear, heavy silver jewellery, and ornate beads), traditional performances (folk music, traditional dances, and storytelling by village elders), local food (apricot-based delicacies, including sun-dried apricots, jams, juices, and traditional Ladakhi dishes made with organic apricot oil), and traditional Ladakhi handicrafts, handloom stalls, and apricot wood carvings. Village homestays accommodation is available.

=== Sham Valley ===
Sham Valley, also known as the "Apricot Valley," is a scenic area situated in the western part of Ladakh, India. Located in the Himalayas, this valley is known for its scenery, diverse cultural legacy, and rural communities. The valley's green fields, filled with apricot and apple orchards, create a sharp contrast with the barren, rough mountains that encircle it. The region's allure is enhanced by the clear blue skies, pristine rivers, and ancient monasteries, attracting photographers and nature lovers to this paradise.

==== Gurudwara Patthar Sahib ====
A Sikh shrine 30 km west of Leh city along the NH1 Leh-Kargil-Srinagar Highway, built in memory of Guru Nanak Dev Ji's visit to Ladakh. It is known for the legend of the large boulder (Patthar) that miraculously moved to protect the Guru from a demon's attack.

==== Magnetic Hill ====
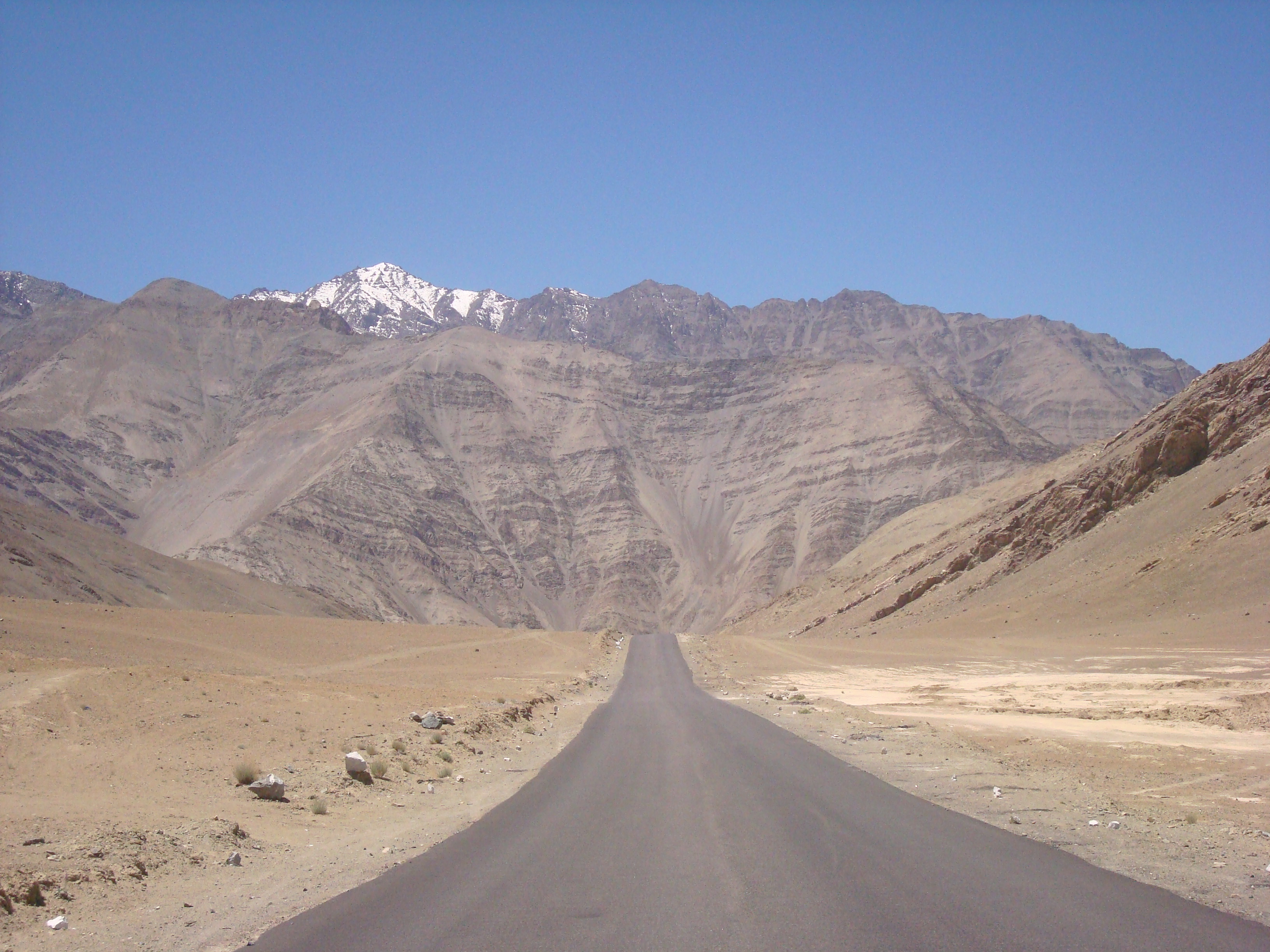
Magnetic hill in Sham district on NH1.

Magnetic Hill is a gravity hill, at an altitude of about 14,000 feet, 30 km west of Leh city along the NH1 Leh-Kargil-Srinagar Highway. It is a stretch of road where vehicles appear to defy gravity and move uphill when left in neutral gear. This optical illusion, caused by the layout of the surrounding land, attracts some curious visitors.

==== Kali Mandir ====
A small temple dedicated to Goddess Kali, located near the Magnetic Hill. It is a place of worship and has views of the surrounding mountains, attracting both devotees and tourists.

==== Confluence of Indus and Zanskar ====
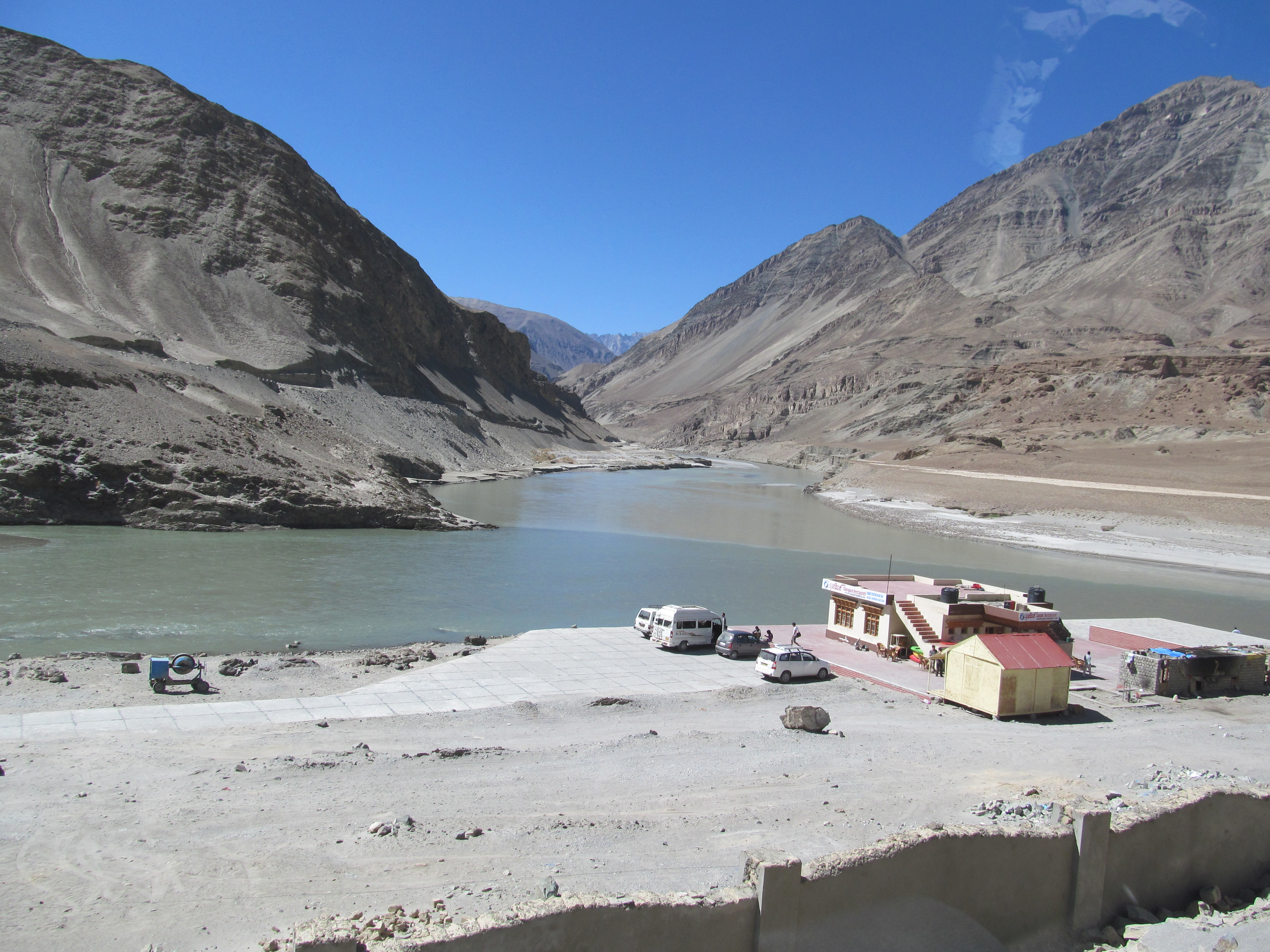
The confluence of the Zanskar River (from top) and the Indus (bottom flowing from left to right) is 3 km southeast of Nimmu/Nimu/Nimoo village along NH1 Kargil-Leh Highway in Ladakh.

The confluence of the brown waters of the Indus River and the green waters of the Zanskar River near Nimmu village is a popular spot for photography and river rafting. It is revered as a sacred prayag in Hinduism and Buddhism.

==== Likir Monastery ====
Likir Monastery, one of the oldest monasteries in Ladakh, is an attraction in Sham Valley. Founded in the 11th century, this monastery belongs to the Gelugpa sect of Tibetan Buddhism. The monastery is home to a large statue of Maitreya Buddha, which stands 23 meters tall. Visitors can explore the monastery's collection of thangkas, ancient manuscripts and wall paintings.

==== Alchi Monastery ====
Alchi Monastery is known for its architecture and ancient artwork. Unlike other monasteries in Ladakh, Alchi is situated on flat ground rather than on a hilltop. It dates back to the 10th century and is known for its well-preserved wall paintings, wood carvings, and statues that reflect the Indo-Tibetan style. The monastery complex consists of several temples, with the Sumtseg and Dukhang being the most notable ones. Alchi Monastery is a UNESCO World Heritage site.

==== Rizong Monastery ====
Rizong Monastery, also known as Yuma Changchubling, is a secluded monastery located amidst rocky hills. Founded in the 19th century, it is one of the most isolated monasteries in Ladakh. Rizong is a meditation center for monks, and it is known for its strict monastic rules. The monastery also has a nunnery located nearby, where nuns practice and study Buddhism.

==== Uleytokpo ====
Uleytokpo is a village in Sham Valley. Known for its scenery, it is a popular stopover for travelers exploring the region and offers opportunities for camping by the Indus River. The village is surrounded by lush greenery and offers views of the mountains. Uleytokpo is an ideal place for nature walks, bird watching, and experiencing the rural lifestyle of Ladakh.

== Transport ==
=== Road ===
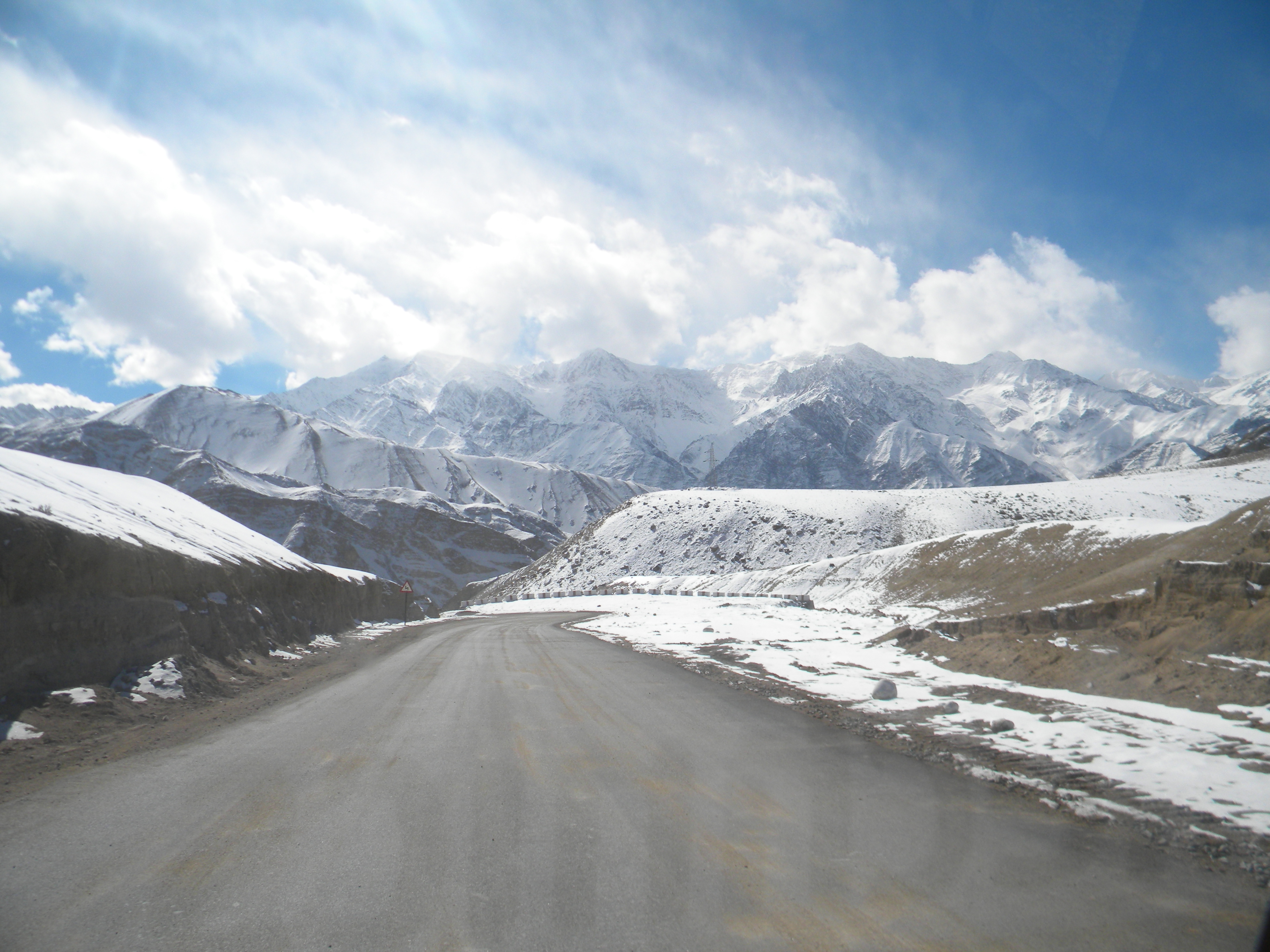
National highway NH 1 connects Srinagar and Leh via Kargil

national highway NH 1 runs through the district and connects Srinagar to Leh. NH 301 extends from the junction with NH 1 in Kargil and extends to Zanskar. The highways connecting Kargil to Srinagar and Zanskar are often blocked by snow from during winter. NH 1 from Kargil to Dras and Leh also experiences temporary blockages due to adverse weather. Government operated buses provide local connectivity, and also connect Kargil with other towns. The Kargil-Skardu road earlier linked Kargitransport added from Kargil to Skardu in Gilgit-Baltistan in Pakistan-administered Kashmir. It has been closed since the Indo-Pakistani war of 1947–1948.

=== Air ===
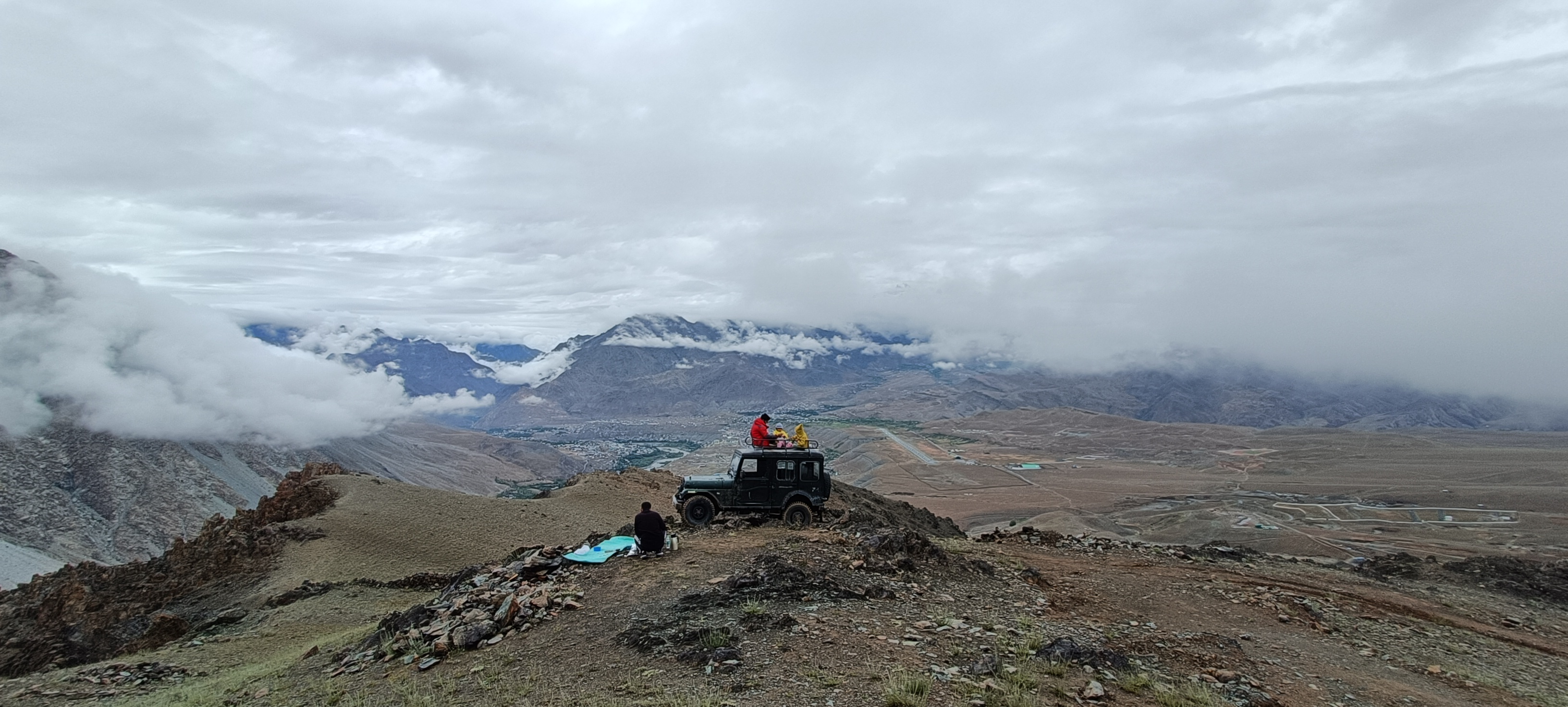
View of Kargil airport from Choskore La.

Kargil Airport was built in 1996 for civilian operations. The operational control was later transferred to the Indian Air Force. The air force operates seasonal flights that carry cargo and transport civilians during the winter. The nearest major airports are the Leh Airport with regular domestic flights and the Srinagar International Airport.

=== Rail ===
Srinagar railway station is the nearest railway station from the town, and has limited railway services. The nearest major railhead is the Jammu Tawi railway station located about 440 km (270 mi) from the town.

== See also ==
- List of districts of Ladakh
- Geography of Ladakh
- Tourism in Ladakh
