= Darchik =

- village
- Derchiks
- Location in Ladakh, India Darchik (India)
- Coordinates: 34.6331626°N 76.3831383°E
- Country: India
- Union Territory: Ladakh
- District: Sham
- Tehsil: Aryan valley
- Household: 85
- Panchayat: Garkon

Area
  - Land: 95.50 ha (236.0 acres)

Population (2011)
  - Total: 624
  - Density: 653/km^{2} (1,690/sq mi)

Languages
  - Official: Brokskat
- Time zone: UTC+5:30 (IST)
- PIN: 194103

Darchik (Alternative spellings: Darchiks, and Derchiks ) is a village located in Aryan valley tehsil of the Sham district of Ladakh, primarily populated by the Brokpa people. The main language spoken here is known as Brokskat (in Ladakhi) which is part of the Dardic language of the Indo-European branch.

== Geography ==
The village includes three hamlets: Gund (Barjay), Hordass and Sanachay.

== History ==
Historically, Chulichan and the adjacent regions were populated by Brokpa people — folklore maintains that they arrived at their current habitat from the Gilgit region. The Brokpa chieftains wielded autonomy in the region, pledging nominal allegiance to the Maqpon rulers of Skardu.

However, things changed in the seventeenth century when Jamyang Namgyal of Ladakh had a conflict with Ali Sher Khan Anchan of Skardu and had to accept Gurgurdho as a boundary between their territories. Consequently, Darchik integrated with Ladakh, though probably not to any substantial extent. In the early nineteenth century, as the village came under the Dogras of Jammu upon their annexation of Ladakh, it became part of Leh tehsil in the princely State of Jammu and Kashmir.

In 1947, as Jammu and Kashmir joined India, Darchik became part of the Ladakh Division. In 1979, it became a part of the newly-formed Kargil District. Local Brokpas have demanded representation to the seats reserved for minorities in the hill council. In the aftermath of the Kargil War, the Indian Army adopted Darchik as a model village under Operation Sadbhavana.

== Demography ==
Darchik falls in the Soudh community development block. As per the 2011 census of India, it has a population of 624 people living in 85 households.

== See also ==
- Geography of Ladakh
- Tourism in Ladakh
