= Dah, Ladakh =

Dah Dha-Bema
- Village
- Location in Ladakh, India Dah (India)
- Coordinates: 34.6025°N 76.5112°E
- Country: India
- Union Territory: Ladakh
- District: Sham
- Tehsil: Aryan Valley
- Tehsil headquarters designation: 16 October 2026
- Tehsil headquarters: Dah-Bema

Population (2011)
  - Total: 609
- Time zone: UTC+5:30 (IST)
- Census code: 939

Dah (or Dha, Da; Tibetan: མདའ, Wylie: mda, THL: da) is a panchayat Town situated on the Bank of Indus river In Aryan Valley It is the most prominent of all the Brokpa settlements, other than Dah, it has six hamlets: Biama(or phunder), Baldes, Sannit, Pardos, Lastyang and Dundur. It serves as the headquarters of Aryan Valley tehsil in Sham district of Ladakh, India.

== Geography ==
Dah village is a frontier part of Ladakh, located on the right bank of the Indus River in Ladakh. It is in on the left side of lower valley of the Dah stream that flows from the Yaldor nullah to drain into the Indus River. The Yaldor nullah gets its water from two mountain streams, one from the north-west (Yaldor West or Gragrio Nullah) and one from the north-east (Yaldor East or Junk Lungnal), which meet in a Y shape at Yaldor village.

Lastyang is a small tributary valley located north of the Indus and northeast of Dha. Baldes is a small pasture valley located on the Baldes stream, across from Lastyang, on the left bank of the Indus River.

Biama (also known as Phunder) is located between Hanu and Dah, at a river junction where the Heniskot stream meets the Danjak. Sannit is a small side valley located north of the Indus and northeast of Dah.

The village and its hamlets are built into the side of a high mountain wall on a slope above the fields. The alleys are used as irrigation canals, with water flowing into the fields on a regular basis. The hamlets are sparsely populated. There are five snowmelt nallah, and a river that serves as a water source. They are located between or near cultivated fields strewn with fruit trees, which are especially concentrated near the stream and water canals. All of the residents of these hamlets have ancestral homes in the Dah village.

Dah stream in Aryan Valley

Traveling up the Dah stream, there are several summer habitations, which the inhabitants of Dha occupy for a short time or longer depending on their elevation. While descending, the first areas to appear are Dunder, Cilgiadi, and Cumavcings, which has cultivated fields. The valley stretching along the Dah stream to its source is a large area. In ancient times, this area was the Minaro summer pasture Nirda. The Nirda pasture is a lovely location. Brokpa worship a large juniper tree festooned with prayer flags as Chilligi Deuha, a shrine (juniper shrine).

=== Flora and fauna ===
Dah village is located on a narrow, extremely green ledge above the otherwise barren Indus River gorge. It has dense vegetation with a wide range of herbs, shrubs, and trees such as shukpa, stagpa, umbu, seva, skyrepa, spenme, kangtakari, askuta, garma, yuled, and kumout. The foliage is dense, and light filters through the grapevine and tree lattice. The houses are dispersed and surrounded by farmland. Apricots, walnuts, willows, and poplars are plenty in the area.

== Demographics ==
The inhabitants of these village are Buddhist Dards known to outsiders as Brokpa, speaking Brokskat language. According to the 2011 census of India, Dah has 103 households. The effective literacy rate (i.e. the literacy rate of population excluding children aged 6 and below) is 58.95%.

Demographics (2011 Census)
	Total	Male	Female
Population	609	324	285
Children aged below 6 years	95	62	33
Scheduled caste	0	0	0
Scheduled tribe	607	323	284
Literates	303	176	127
Workers (all)	312	160	152
Main workers (total)	183	152	31
Main workers: Cultivators	135	110	25
Main workers: Agricultural labourers	1	0	1
Main workers: Household industry workers	1	1	0
Main workers: Other	46	41	5
Marginal workers (total)	129	8	121
Marginal workers: Cultivators	119	1	118
Marginal workers: Agricultural labourers	0	0	0
Marginal workers: Household industry workers	0	0	0
Marginal workers: Others	10	7	3
Non-workers	297	164	133

== See also ==
- Geography of Ladakh
- Tourism in Ladakh
