= Skur Buchan =

Skur Buchan Skurbuchan
- Village and Tehsil
- Location in Ladakh, India Skur Buchan (India)
- Coordinates: 34°26′07″N 76°42′38″E
- Country: India
- Union Territory: Ladakh
- District: Sham
- Tehsil: Skurbuchan

Population (2011)
  - Total: 1,932
- Time zone: UTC+5:30 (IST)
- Census code: 943

Skurbuchan, also spelled Skitchan, is the headquarters of the eponymous block and one of the tehsil in the Sham district of Ladakh, India. It is located 125 km (78 mi) west of Leh city. People here are devoted to Tibetan Buddhism, particularly the Drikung Kagyu lineage.

== Demographics ==
According to the 2011 census of India, Skur Buchan has 299 households. The effective literacy rate (i.e. the literacy rate of population excluding children aged 6 and below) is 66.13%.

Demographics (2011 Census)
	Total	Male	Female
Population	1932	916	1016
Children aged below 6 years	243	138	105
Scheduled caste	4	2	2
Scheduled tribe	1905	901	1004
Literates	1117	555	562
Workers (all)	1290	609	681
Main workers (total)	861	455	406
Main workers: Cultivators	338	129	209
Main workers: Agricultural labourers	46	17	29
Main workers: Household industry workers	48	5	43
Main workers: Other	429	304	125
Marginal workers (total)	429	154	275
Marginal workers: Cultivators	293	93	200
Marginal workers: Agricultural labourers	28	8	20
Marginal workers: Household industry workers	17	2	15
Marginal workers: Others	91	51	40
Non-workers	642	307	335
