= Wanla =

- Village and Tehsil
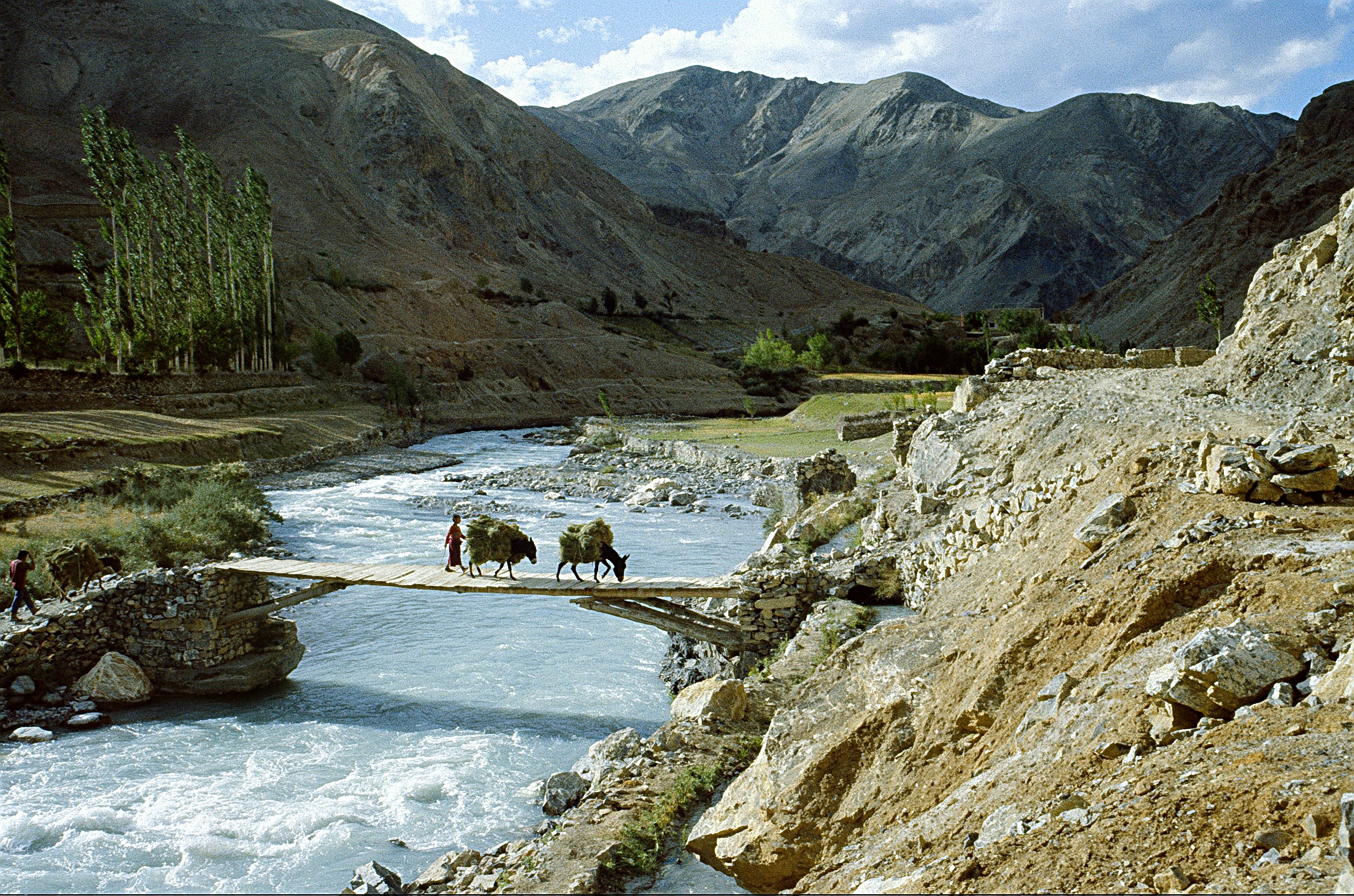
- Yapola River in Wanla
- Interactive map of Wanla
- Location in Ladakh, India Wanla (India)
- Coordinates: 34.2490°N 76.8299°E
- Country: India
- Union Territory: Ladakh
- District: Sham
- Tehsil: Wanla

Population (2011)
  - Total: 1,015
- Time zone: UTC+5:30 (IST)
- Census code: 954

Wanla is a village and one of the tehsil in the Sham district of Ladakh, India. It is located on the banks of the Yapola River (also known as the Wanla river). The Wanla Monastery is located in this village.

== Demographics ==
According to the 2011 census of India, Wanla has 170 households. The effective literacy rate (i.e. the literacy rate of population excluding children aged 6 and below) is 63.81%.

Demographics (2011 Census)
| | Total | Male | Female |
|---|---|---|---|
| Population | 1015 | 518 | 497 |
| Children aged below 6 years | 106 | 57 | 49 |
| Scheduled caste | 0 | 0 | 0 |
| Scheduled tribe | 1014 | 517 | 497 |
| Literates | 580 | 327 | 253 |
| Workers (all) | 529 | 266 | 263 |
| Main workers (total) | 317 | 248 | 69 |
| Main workers: Cultivators | 196 | 159 | 37 |
| Main workers: Agricultural labourers | 2 | 1 | 1 |
| Main workers: Household industry workers | 2 | 2 | 0 |
| Main workers: Other | 117 | 86 | 31 |
| Marginal workers (total) | 212 | 18 | 194 |
| Marginal workers: Cultivators | 190 | 7 | 183 |
| Marginal workers: Agricultural labourers | 3 | 0 | 3 |
| Marginal workers: Household industry workers | 1 | 0 | 1 |
| Marginal workers: Others | 18 | 11 | 7 |
| Non-workers | 486 | 252 | 234 |

== Culture ==
Wanla is known to produce Pashmina wool, wood carvings (Ladakh Shing-skos) and Thangka paintings for local livelihood and cultural heritage preservation. Ladakh Shing-skos received Geographical Indication tag in 2024 and artisans are from Wanla cluster are recognized as master carvers.
