= Temisgam =

Temisgam Timishgan, Temisgang
- Village and Tehsil
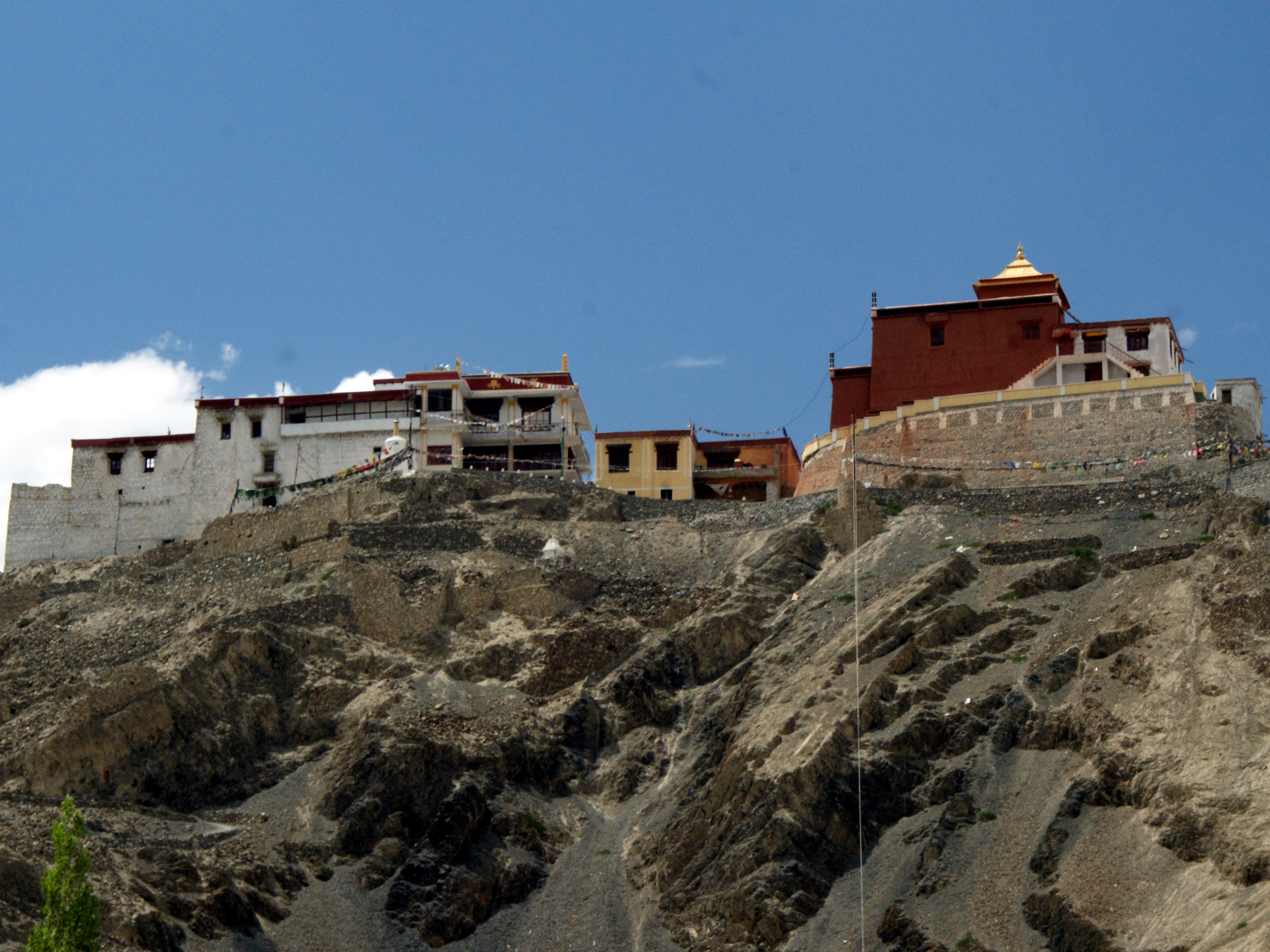
- Tingmosgang Monastery

- Location in Ladakh, India Temisgam (India)
- Coordinates: 34.324370°N 76.988744°E
- Country: India
- Union Territory: Ladakh
- District: Sham
- Tehsil: Temisgam

Population (2011)
  - Total: 1,517
- Time zone: UTC+5:30 (IST)
- Census code: 941

Temisgam is a village and one of the tehsil in the Sham district of Ladakh, India. The Tingmosgang castle and monastery are located here.

== Demographics ==
According to the 2011 census of India, Temisgam has 234 households. The effective literacy rate (i.e. the literacy rate of population excluding children aged 6 and below) is 75.48%.

Demographics (2011 Census)
	Total	Male	Female
Population	1517	744	773
Children aged below 6 years	171	104	67
Scheduled caste	3	3	0
Scheduled tribe	1431	698	733
Literates	1016	553	463
Workers (all)	891	429	462
Main workers (total)	642	329	313
Main workers: Cultivators	319	160	159
Main workers: Agricultural labourers	21	14	7
Main workers: Household industry workers	87	22	65
Main workers: Other	215	133	82
Marginal workers (total)	249	100	149
Marginal workers: Cultivators	36	14	22
Marginal workers: Agricultural labourers	96	15	81
Marginal workers: Household industry workers	49	26	23
Marginal workers: Others	68	45	23
Non-workers	626	315	311
