= Suspol =

Suspol Saspol
- Village and Tehsil
- Location in Ladakh, India Suspol (India)
- Coordinates: 34.3519096°N 77.170334°E
- Country: India
- Union Territory: Ladakh
- District: Sham
- Tehsil: Saspol
- Elevation: 4,945 m (16,224 ft)

Population (2011)
  - Total: 1,205

Languages
  - Official: Hindi, English
- Time zone: UTC+5:30 (IST)
- 2011 census code: 952

Suspol, also spelled Saspol, is a village and eponymous tehsil headquarter in the Sham district of Ladakh in India.

Saspol village is home to Saspol Caves. The interior walls of some of these caves are decorated with unique 15th century CE wall paintings.

== Demographics ==
According to the 2011 census of India, Suspol has 198 households. The effective literacy rate (i.e. the literacy rate of population excluding children aged 6 and below) is 84.05%.

Demographics (2011 Census)
	Total	Male	Female
Population	1205	641	564
Children aged below 6 years	114	63	51
Scheduled caste	0	0	0
Scheduled tribe	1159	596	563
Literates	917	522	395
Workers (all)	785	402	383
Main workers (total)	469	272	197
Main workers: Cultivators	158	131	27
Main workers: Agricultural labourers	2	0	2
Main workers: Household industry workers	100	2	98
Main workers: Other	209	139	70
Marginal workers (total)	316	130	186
Marginal workers: Cultivators	90	31	59
Marginal workers: Agricultural labourers	32	4	28
Marginal workers: Household industry workers	31	9	22
Marginal workers: Others	163	86	77
Non-workers	420	239	181
