= History of Ladakh =

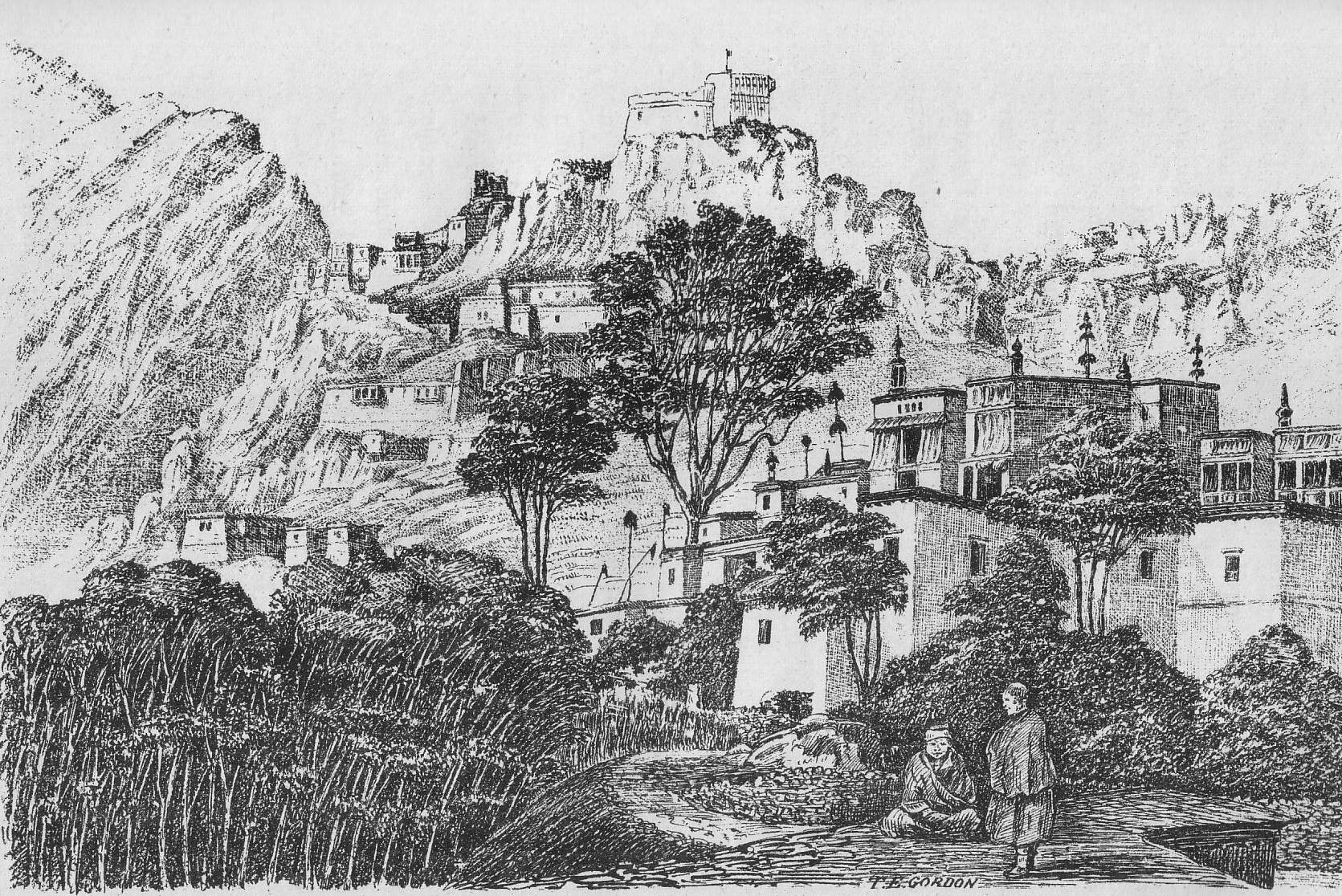
Hemis Monastery in the 1870s

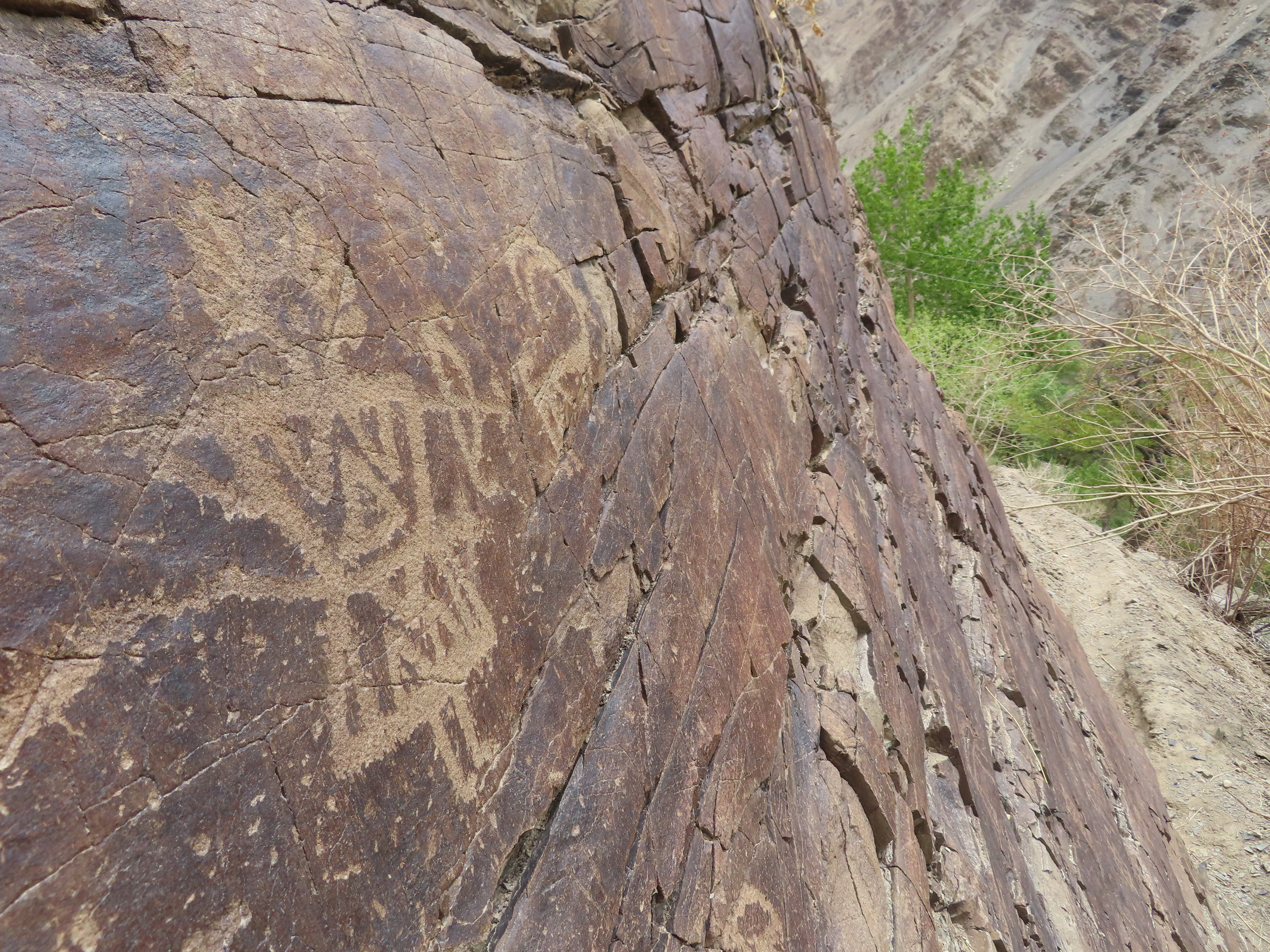
Rock art in Ladak

Ladakh has a long history of human settlement, with archaeological evidence dating back to about 9000 B.C. It has been a crossroads of High Asia for thousands of years and has seen many cultures, empires and technologies born in its neighbours. As a result of these developments Ladakh has imported many traditions and culture from its neighbours and combining them all gave rise to a unique tradition and culture of its own.

== Earliest history ==
The first glimpse of political history is found in the kharosthi inscription of "Uvima Kavthisa" discovered near the K'a-la-rtse (Khalatse) bridge on the Indus, suggesting a Kushan presence in Ladakh around 112 CE. Two other short Kharosthi and a few Brahmi inscriptions were also recorded at Khalatse.

The Chinese pilgrim monk Xuanzang, c. 634 CE, described a journey from Chuluduo (Kūluta, Kulu) to Luohuluo (Lahul) and then states that, "[f]rom here, the road, leading to the north, for over one thousand, eight hundred or nine hundred li by perilous paths and over mountains and valleys, takes one to the country of Lāhul. Going further to the north over two thousand li along a route full of difficulties and obstacles, in cold winds and wafting snowflakes, one could reach the country of Marsa (also known as Sanbohe)." The kingdom of Moluosuo, or Mar-sa, would seem to be synonymous with Mar-yul, a common name for Ladakh. Elsewhere, the text remarks that Mo-lo-so, also called San-po-ho borders with Suvarnagotra or Suvarnabhumi (Land of Gold), identical with the Kingdom of Women (Strirajya). According to Tucci, the Zhangzhung kingdom, or at least its southern districts, were known by this name by the 7th-century Indians. In 634/5 Zhangzhung acknowledged Tibetan suzerainty for the first time, and in 653 a Tibetan commissioner (mnan) was appointed there. Regular administration was introduced in 662, and an unsuccessful rebellion broke out in 677.

In the 8th century, Ladakh was caught between Tibetan expansion pressing from the east, and Chinese influence exerted from Central Asia through the passes. In 719 a census was taken, and in 724 the administration was reorganized. In 737, the Tibetans launched an attack against the king of Bru-za (Gilgit), who asked for Chinese help, but was ultimately forced to pay homage to Tibet. The Korean monk Hyecho (704-787) (pinyin: Hui Chao), reached India by sea and returned to China in 727 via central Asia. He referred to three kingdoms lying to the northeast of Kashmir which were:

"under the suzerainty of the Tibetans. . . . The country is narrow and small, and the mountains and valleys very rugged. There are monasteries and monks, and the people faithfully venerate the Three Jewels. As to the kingdom of Tibet to the East, there are no monasteries at all, and the Buddha's teaching is unknown; but, in [these] countries, the population consists of Hu; therefore, they are believers. (Petech, The Kingdom of Ladakh, p. 10)."

Rizvi points out that this passage not only confirms that, in the early 8th century, the region of modern Ladakh was under Tibetan suzerainty, but that the people belonged to non-Tibetan stock.

In 747, the hold of Tibet was loosened by the campaign of Chinese General Gao Xianzhi, who tried to re-open the direct communications between Central Asia and Kashmir. After Gao's defeat by the Qarluqs and Arabs on the Talas river (751), Chinese influence decreased rapidly and Tibetan influence resumed.

The geographical treatise Hudud-al-Alam (982) mentions Bolorian (Bolor = Bolu, Baltistan) Tibet, where people were chiefly merchants and lived in huts. Nestorian crosses carved into boulders, apparently due to Sogdian Christian merchants found in Drangtse (Tangtse), and Arabic inscriptions of about the same time are evidence of the importance of trade in this region. After the collapse of the Tibetan monarchy in 842, Tibetan suzerainty quickly vanished.

== La-Chen/Gon dynasty ==
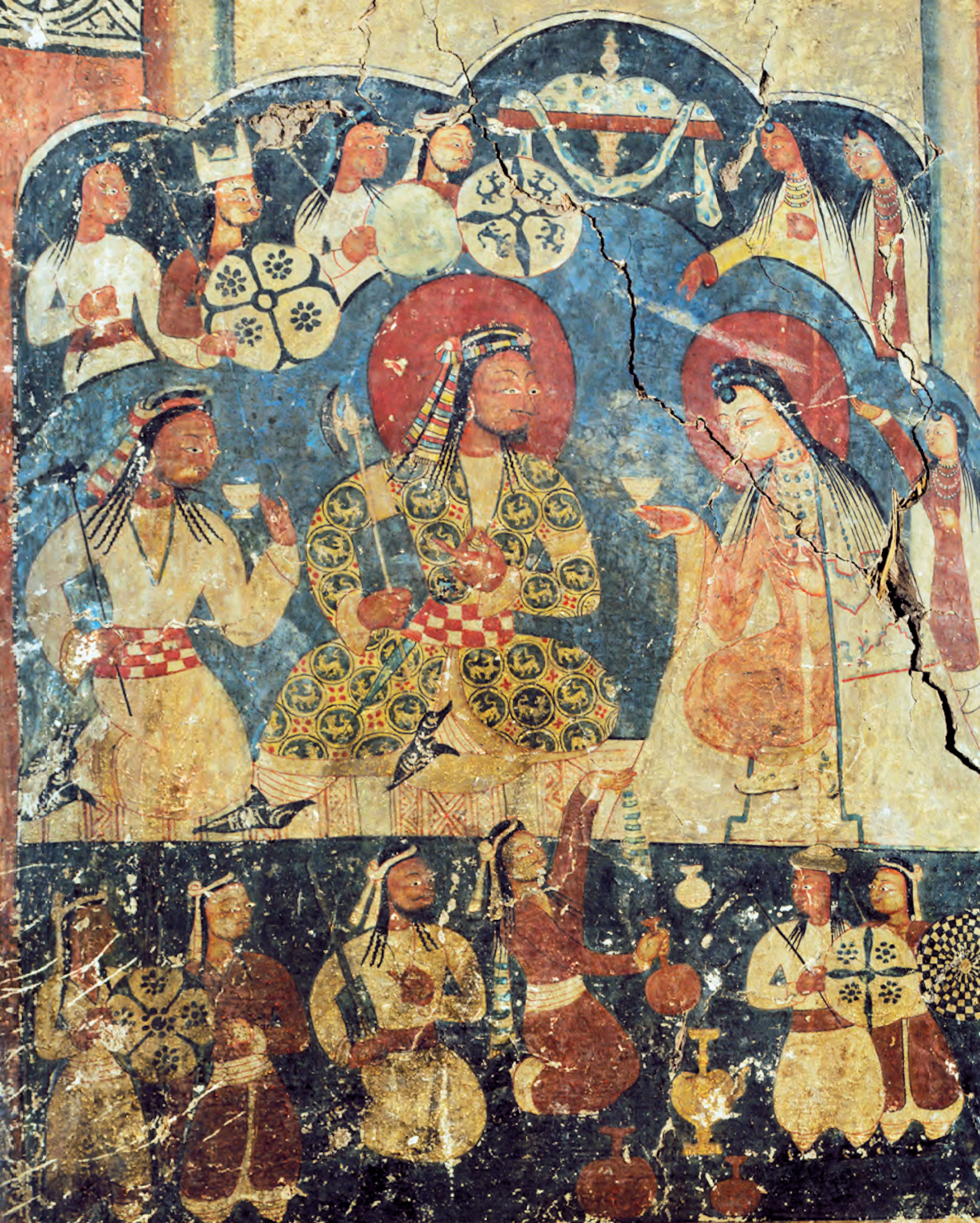
Royal drinking scene at Alchi Monastery circa 1200 CE. The king wears a decorated Qabā', of Turco-Persian style. It is similar to another royal scene at nearby Mangyu Monastery.

After the breakup of the Tibetan Empire in 842, Nyima-Gon, a representative of the ancient Tibetan royal house founded the first Ladakh dynasty. Nyima-Gon's kingdom had its centre well to the east of present-day Ladakh. This was the period in which Ladakh underwent Tibetanization, eventually making Ladakh a country inhabited by a mixed population, the predominant racial strain of which was Tibetan. However, soon after the conquest, the dynasty, intent on establishing Buddhism, looked not to Tibet, but to north-west India, particularly Kashmir. This has been termed the Second Spreading of Buddhism in the region (the first one being in Tibet proper.) An early king, Lde-dpal-hkhor-btsan (c. 870 -900), swore an oath to develop the Bön religion in Ladakh and was responsible for erecting eight early monasteries including the Upper Manahris monastery. He also encouraged the mass production of the Hbum scriptures to spread religion. Little, however is known about the early kings of Nyima-Gon's dynasty. The fifth king in line has a Sanskrit name, Lhachen Utpala, who conquered Kulu, Mustang, and parts of Baltistan.

Around the 13th century, due to Islamic invasions, India ceased having anything to offer from a Buddhist point of view, and Ladakh began to seek and accept guidance in religious matters from Tibet.

== The Namgyal dynasty ==
Continual raids on Ladakh by the plundering Muslim states of Central Asia led to the weakening and partial conversion of Ladakh. Ladakh was divided, with Lower Ladakh ruled by King Takpabum from Basgo and Temisgam, and Upper Ladakh by King Takbumde from Leh and Shey. Lhachen Bhagan, a later Basgo king, reunited Ladakh by overthrowing the king of Leh. He took on the surname Namgyal (meaning victorious) and founded a new dynasty which still survives today. King Tashi Namgyal (1555–1575) managed to repel most Central Asian raiders, and built a royal fort on the top of the Namgyal Peak. Tsewang Namgyal temporarily extended his kingdom as far as Nepal.

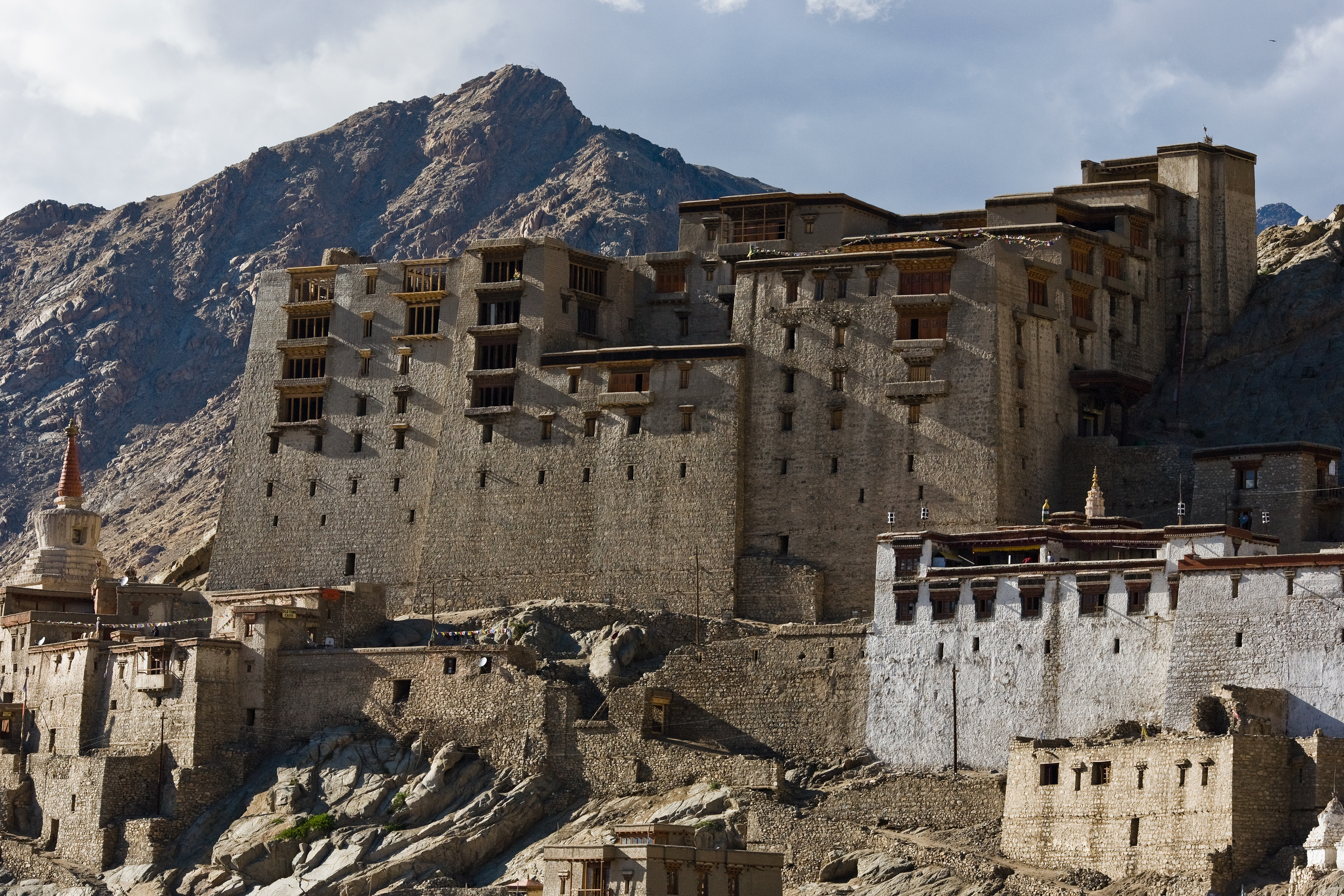
The Leh Palace, built by Sengge Namgyal

During the reign of Jamyang Namgyal, Ladakh was invaded by Balti ruler Ali Sher Khan Anchan in response to Jamyang's killing of some Muslim rulers of Baltistan. Many Buddhist gompas were damaged during Khan's invasion. Today, few gompas exist from before this period. The success of Khan's campaign impressed his enemies. According to some accounts, Jamyang secured a peace treaty and gave his daughter's hand in marriage to Ali Sher Khan. Jamyang was given the hand of a Muslim princess, Gyal Khatun's hand in marriage. Sengge Namgyal (1616–1642), known as the 'lion' king was the son of Jamyang and Gyal. He made efforts to restore Ladakh to its old glory by an ambitious and energetic building programme by rebuilding several gompas and shrines, the most famous of which is Hemis. He also moved the royal headquarters from Shey Palace to Leh Palace and expanded the kingdom into Zanskar and Spiti, but was defeated by the Mughals, who had already occupied Kashmir and Baltistan. His son Deldan Namgyal (1642–1694) had to placate the Mughal emperor Aurangzeb by building a mosque in Leh. However, he later with the help of the Mughal Army under Fidai Khan, son of Mughal viceroy of Kashmir, Ibrahim Khan, defeated the 5th Dalai Lama invasion in the plains of Chargyal, situated between Neemoo and Basgo.

Many Muslim missionaries propagated Islam during this period in Ladakh and proselytised many Ladakhi people. Many Balti Muslims settled in Leh after the marriage of Jamyang to Gyal. Muslims were also invited to the region for trading and other purposes.

== Modern times ==
=== Princely state of Jammu and Kashmir ===
By the beginning of the 19th century, the Mughal Empire had collapsed, and Sikh rule had been established in Punjab and Kashmir. However the Dogra region of Jammu remained under its Rajput rulers. Raja Gulab Singh, acting under the suzerainty of the Sikh monarch Ranjit Singh, sent his general Zorawar Singh to invade Ladakh in 1834. King Tshespal Namgyal was dethroned and exiled to Stok. Ladakh came under Dogra rule and was later incorporated into the princely state of Jammu and Kashmir under British suzerainty. It still maintained considerable autonomy and relations with Tibet. During the Dogra–Tibetan War (1841–42), Tibet invaded Ladakh and the Ladakhis attempted to overthrow the Dogras with Tibetan help, but all of them were defeated. The Namgyal family was given the jagir of Stok, which it nominally retains to this day. European influence began in Ladakh in the 1850s and increased. Geologists, sportsmen, and tourists began exploring Ladakh. In 1885, Leh became the headquarters of a mission of the Moravian Church.

Ladakh was administered as a wazarat during the Dogra rule, with a governor termed wazir-e-wazarat. It had three tehsils, based at Leh, Skardu and Kargil. The headquarters of the wazarat was at Leh for six months of the year and at Skardu for six months. When the legislative assembly called Praja Sabha was established in 1934, Ladakh was given two nominated seats in the assembly.

Administrators of Ladakh (1846–1905)
Maharaja	Administrators (a.k.a. Thanedar, Wazir Wazarat, Kardar, Governor)	Start	End	Ref
Gulab Singh (1846–1857)	Magna Thanedar (Note: Appointed by Zorawar Singh. "The system of administration introduced by Wazir Zorawar remained in force for some time.")	1846	1847	
Gulab Singh (1846–1857)	Mehta Basti Ram	1847	1860	
Ranbir Singh (1857–1885)	Mehta Mangal (Note: "Kedaru Thanedar was followed by Wazir Labajoo of Kishtwar as Kardar of Baltistan in 1863. […] He was succeeded by Mehta Mangal whose decade long reign from 1875 to 1885 […]")	1860	1865	
Ranbir Singh (1857–1885)	Wazir Shibsarn	1865	1867	
Ranbir Singh (1857–1885)	Sayyid Akbar Ali	1867	1868	
Ranbir Singh (1857–1885)	Frederic Drew	1868	1871	
Ranbir Singh (1857–1885)	William H. Johnson	1871	1882	
Ranbir Singh (1857–1885)	Pandit Radha Krishen Kaul	1882	1888	
Pratap Singh (1885–1925)	Sardar Muhammad Akbar Khan	1888	1891	
Pratap Singh (1885–1925)	Diwan Urjan Nath	1891	1893	
Pratap Singh (1885–1925)	Pandit Parkash Joo	1893	1895	
Pratap Singh (1885–1925)	Lala Bishan Das	1895	1900	
Pratap Singh (1885–1925)	Pandit Lachman Das	1900	1901	
Pratap Singh (1885–1925)	Pandit Vaskak Dhar	1901	1903	
Pratap Singh (1885–1925)	Munshi Faqir Chand	1903	1906	
Pratap Singh (1885–1925)	Chaudhri Khushi Mohammad	1906	1908	
Pratap Singh (1885–1925)	Sham Lal	1908	1909	
Pratap Singh (1885–1925)	Sultan Khan	1909	1910	
Pratap Singh (1885–1925)	Hashmat Ullah Khan	1910	1912	
Pratap Singh (1885–1925)	Janak Singh	1912	1913	
Pratap Singh (1885–1925)	Trilik Chand	1913	1919	
Pratap Singh (1885–1925)	Dewan Munshi La	1919	1921	
Pratap Singh (1885–1925)	Wazir Feroz Chand	1921	1926	
Pratap Singh (1885–1925)	Administrative borders of Ladakh, Gilgit and Baltistan undergo changes			
Hari Singh (1925–1952)	Pandit Shri Ram	1926	1929	
Hari Singh (1925–1952)	Niranjan Lal	1929	1933	
Hari Singh (1925–1952)	Rao Rattan Singh	1933	1938	
Hari Singh (1925–1952)	Chowdhary Faiz Ullah Khan	1938	1940	
Hari Singh (1925–1952)	Dhruv Singh	1940	1943	
Hari Singh (1925–1952)	Ramesh Chander	1943	1946	
Hari Singh (1925–1952)	Bishmamber Nath Jutshi	1946	1947	

Ladakh was claimed as part of Tibet by Phuntsok Wangyal, a Tibetan Communist leader.

=== Indian state of Jammu and Kashmir ===
In 1947, partition left Ladakh a part of the Indian state of Jammu and Kashmir, to be administered from Srinagar. In 1948, Pakistani raiders invaded Ladakh and occupied Kargil and Zanskar, reaching within 30 km of Leh. Reinforcement troops were sent in by air, and a battalion of Gurkhas made its way slowly to Leh on foot from south. Kargil was a scene of fighting again in 1965, 1971, and 1999.

In 1949, China closed the border between Nubra and Sinkiang, blocking the 1000-year-old trade route from India to Central Asia. In 1950, China invaded Tibet, and thousands of Tibetans, including the Dalai Lama sought refuge in India. In 1962, China occupied Aksai Chin, and promptly built roads connecting Xinjiang and Tibet, and the Karakoram Highway, jointly with Pakistan. India built the Srinagar-Leh highway during this period, cutting the journey time between Srinagar and Leh from 16 days to two. Simultaneously, China closed the Ladakh-Tibet border, ending the 700-year-old Ladakh-Tibet relationship.

Since the early 1960s the number of immigrants from Tibet (including Changpa nomads) has increased as they flee the occupation of their homeland by the Chinese. Today, Leh has some 3,500 refugees from Tibet. They hold no passports, only customs papers. Some Tibetan refugees in Ladakh claim dual Tibetan/Indian citizenship, although their Indian citizenship is unofficial. Since partition Ladakh has been governed by the State government based in Srinagar, never to the complete satisfaction of the Ladakhis, who demand that Ladakh be directly governed from New Delhi as a Union Territory. They allege continued apathy, Muslim bias, and corruption of the state government as reasons for their demands. In 1989, there were violent riots between Buddhists and Muslims, provoking the Ladakh Buddhist Council to call for a social and economic boycott of Muslims, which was lifted in 1992. In October 1993, the Indian government and the State government agreed to grant Ladakh the status of Autonomous Hill Council. In 1995, the Ladakh Autonomous Hill Development Council was created.

In February 2019, Ladakh became a separate Revenue and Administrative Division within Jammu and Kashmir, having previously been part of the Kashmir Division. As a division, Ladakh was granted its own Divisional Commissioner and Inspector General of Police.

Leh was initially chosen to be the headquarters of the new division however, following protests, it was announced that Leh and Kargil will jointly serve as the divisional headquarters, each hosting an Additional Divisional Commissioner to assist the Divisional Commissioner and Inspector General of Police who will spend half their time in each town.

=== Indian union territory of Ladakh ===
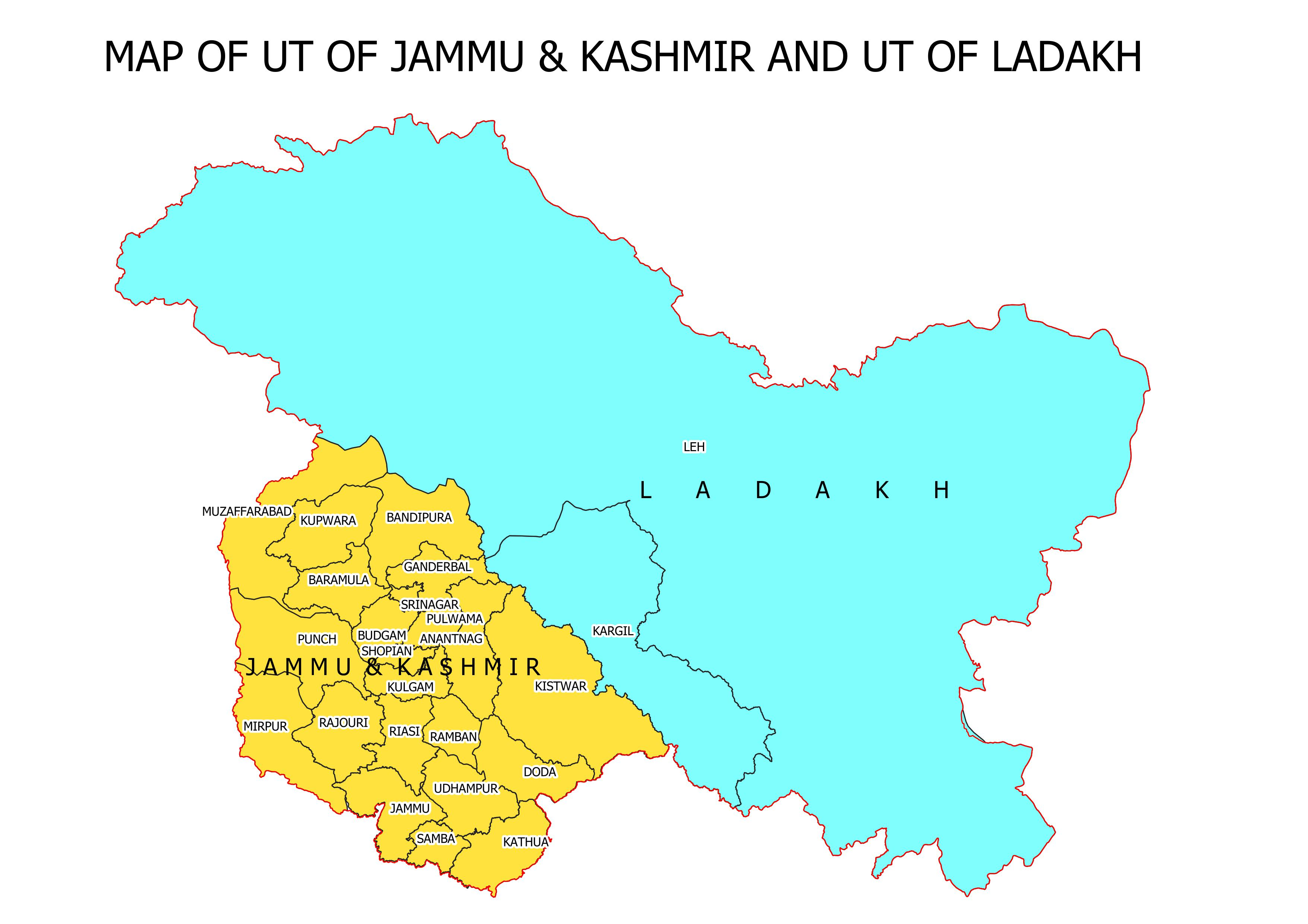
Map of Ladakb released by Government of India but 1.Gilgit-Baltistan 2.Aksai Chin are not controlled.

In August 2019, a reorganisation act was passed by the Parliament of India which contained provisions to reconstitute Ladakh as a union territory, separate from the rest of Jammu and Kashmir on 31 October 2019. Under the terms of the act, the union territory was to be administered by a Lieutenant Governor acting on behalf of the central Government of India and would not have an elected legislative assembly or chief minister. Each district within the new union territory will continue to elect an autonomous district council as done previously.

== Map ==
History of Ladakh (Ladakh)
Clickable map of points taken from the local map of Ladakh drawn by Ea Rasmussen, Moesgaard Museum/University of Aarhus. The highlighted yellow area on the base map is the administrative area of the Union Territory of Ladakh.
- Aqua highlight labels represent Gompas or monasteries that paid the highest taxes in the 1850s — Hemis (with Hanle) Rs 900; Chimra Rs 900; Thigse Rs 500; Pitak Rs 500; Gawan Rs 900; Lama Yuru Rs 900. (see Strachey's 1851 map of Ladakh for similar location spellings i.e. Chimra/Chemre etc)
- Route marked in red arrows depicts routes of Zorawar Singh's Ladakhi and Balti campaigns. Arrows 1 to 5 depict the start from Kishtawar in 1834, through Warwan to Suru Valley, then north to Dkarste and from there turning south east to Khalatse. Arrows A to D depict the conquest of Balti, reaching Skardu and back. Coloured labels represent southeast–wards conquests heading into Tibet and ending at Taklakot.
- Col N. Kumar led Indian teams climbed Teram Kangri II in 1978 and Sia Kangri and Saltoro Kangri in 1981.

== Historiography ==
The main written source for Ladakhi history is the 17th century Ladakh Chronicles. The Ladakhi Chronicles are one of only two surviving pre-19th century literary sources from Ladakh, with the other being the 1663 biography of sTag-ts'ah-ras-pa. Only seven original manuscripts of the chronicles are known to have existed, of which only two survive to the modern day.
