= Ladakh Chronicles =

Historical work about Ladakh

The Ladakh Chronicles, or La-dvags-rgyal-rabs (Tibetan: ལ་དྭགས་རྒྱལ་རབས, Wylie: La dwags rgyal rabs), (Note: also called the Royal Chronicle of Ladakh) is a historical work that covers the history of Ladakh from the beginnings of the first Tibetan dynasty of Ladakh until the end of the Namgyal dynasty. The chronicles were compiled by the Namgyal dynasty, mostly during the 17th century, and are considered the primary written source for Ladakhi history.

It remains one of only two surviving pre-19th century literary sources from Ladakh. Only seven original manuscripts of the chronicles are known to have existed, of which two survive today.

== Background ==
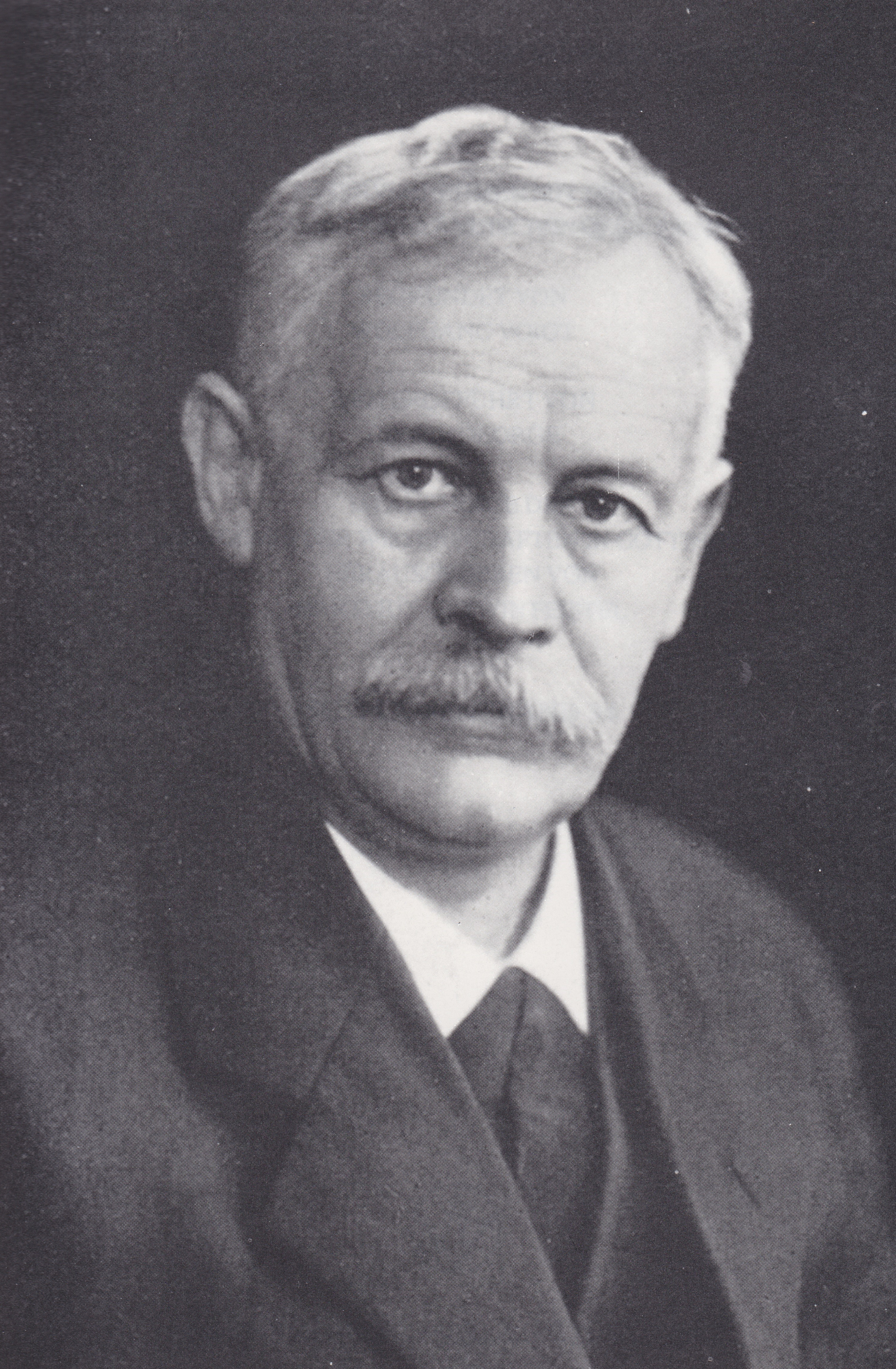
August Hermann Francke, whose translation became widely used for studying the Ladakh Chronicles.

Until the early 19th century, European historians believed that there were no written histories from Ladakh. After reports to the contrary, Alexander Cunningham found the first known manuscript of the chronicles (Ms. Cunningham) during his stay in Ladakh in 1847.

The origin, intent, and time of the authorship of the Ladakh Chronicles remains unknown to modern historians. (Note: Bray describes the intent of the third chronicle as "to present the Ladakhi royal dynasty in the best possible light".) It remains one of only two surviving pre-19th century literary sources from Ladakh.

== Manuscripts ==
There are seven extant manuscripts of the Ladakh Chronicles:

- Ms.S Bodleian Library in Oxford, MS.Tibet. c.7.: This manuscript belonged to the former King of Ladakh and was stored in the library of the sTog palace. The original manuscript has since disappeared, but its contents were copied in 1856 and later published by Emil Schlagintweit together with a German translation as Die Könige von Tibet.
- Ms.A: This manuscript only covers the history up until the reign of Sengge Namgyal (r. 1616–1642). The original manuscript no longer survives but its text was partly published and translated by missionary Karl Marx. It was published posthumously in the Journal of the Asiatic Society of Bengal between 1891 and 1902.
- Ms.B: This manuscript consists of only four pages about the Namgyal dynasty and its conquest by the Dogra dynasty of Jammu and Kashmir. The original manuscript no longer exists.
- Ms.C: This manuscript was compiled at the end of the 19th century by Ladakhi scholar Munshi dPal-rgyas (Note: also known as Munshi Tsering Palgyas) and includes three appendices about the Dogra conquest. The original no longer exists.
- Ms.L British Museum, Oriental Collection 6683: This manuscript covers Ladakhi history until the reign of Deldan Namgyal (r. 1642–1694) and also contains a plainlist of subsequent rulers until the Dogra conquest.
- Ms.Cunningham: Covers the history from the reign of Tsewang Namgyal I (r. 1575–1595) until at least the reign of Delek Namgyal (r. 1680–1691). The manuscript was translated into Urdu for Alexander Cunninhgam during his stay in Ladakh in 1847, from which parts were even reproduced in his English works; he did not consider the story after the end of the 17th century to be important and omitted those parts. The original manuscript and its Urdu translations are lost.
- Ms.Sonam: Consists of approximately 40 pages and covers the entire history of the two Ladakhi dynasties until the Dogra conquest. The manuscript is a modernized and shortened version of Ms.C until events c. 1825, after which it contains extra details that are not covered by the other manuscripts. Its owner also added appendices and minor changes not originally contained in the manuscript, and it is known to be in the private possession of a 'Bri-guh-pa monk, named Sonam, at the Lamayuru Monastery.

=== Combined edition and scholarship ===
In 1926, Tibetologist August Herman Francke published a non-critical translation of the chronicle, in what was the first detailed history of Ladakh. His edition was based on five manuscripts (Ms.S, Ms.A, Ms.B, Ms.C, Ms.L). Francke's edition would become the standard edition for all future studies on the pre-Dogra Ladakh.

In the later part of the 20th century, research on the Ladakh Chronicles was complemented by further studies by Joseph Gergan, Luciano Petech, and Zahiruddin Ahmad. Petech, in a comparative study with other texts, notes an abundance of omissions and mistakes; he warns against trusting the chronicle blindly. Other scholars have also warned about gaps in the chronicles' treatment of the period before the 17th century.

== Contents ==
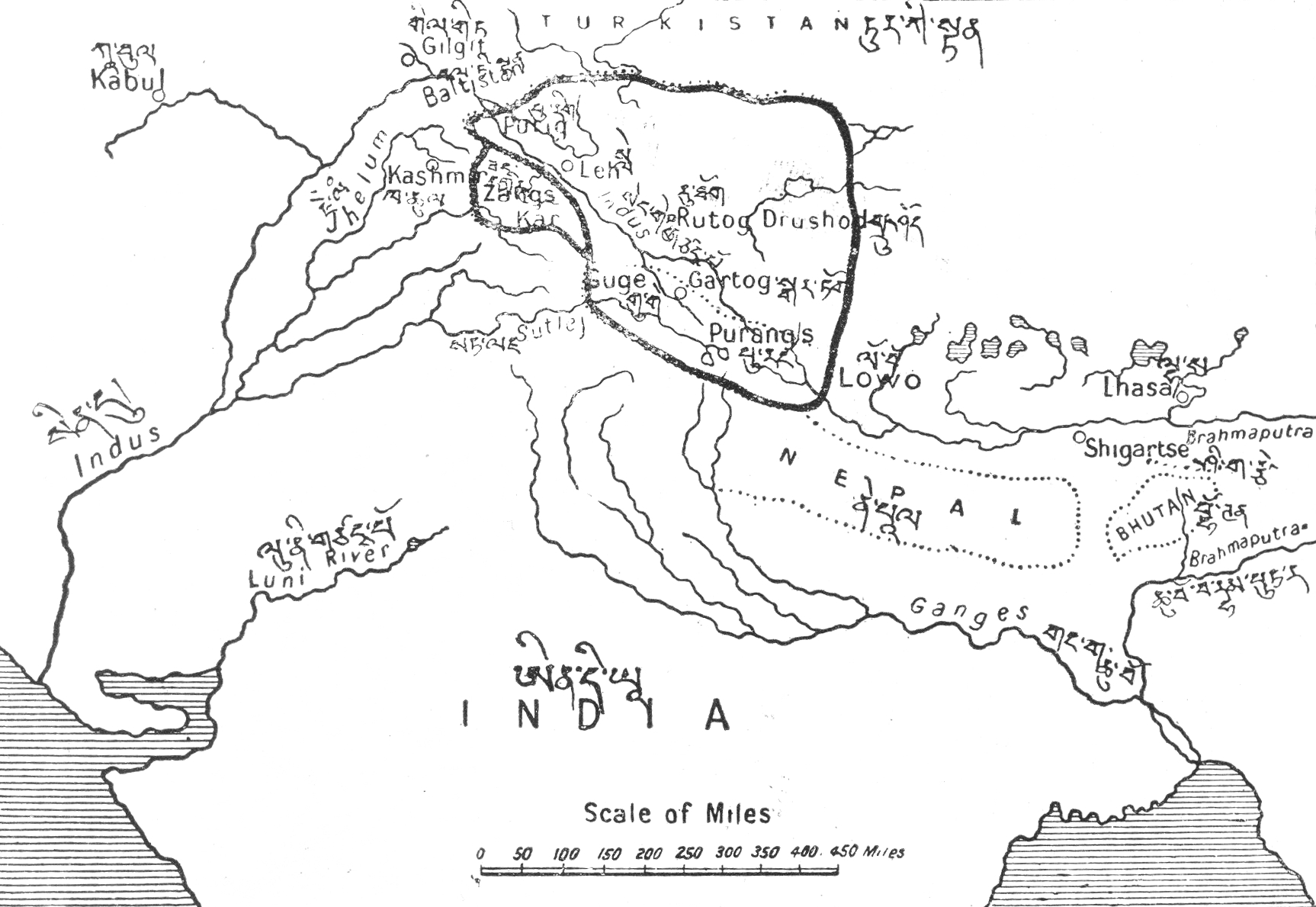
Maryul (c. 975 CE – 1000 CE) as depicted by A. H. Francke. The border between Maryul and Guge is shown with a thin dotted line, slightly to the north of Gartok; the border between Maryul and Zanskar is marked by a bolded line, slightly to the west of Leh.

The Ladakh Chronicles were split into three main sections: the first two sections are about the history of central Tibet; the third section is specifically about Ladakh. The principal chronicle is the Royal Genealogy of Ladakh. The chronicles refers to several dynasties of kings, mentioning that some were descended from the mythological Tibetan hero Gesar.

Tibetans controlled the area from 663, and it was controlled by the Tibetan Empire until 842, after which the area was described by the chronicles as splintering into several principalities plagued by warfare and raiding. The chronicles then describe the establishment of Maryul by descendants of the central Tibetan monarchy in the 10th century. The chronicles describe the period of conflicts with the Mughal Empire during the late 14th to 16th centuries in Ladakh and Baltistan. The chronicles then describe the development of the Namgyal dynasty and its expansion to Purig in the west and the Tibetan lands of Guge in the east. The latter parts of the Ladakh Chronicles in manuscripts Ms. C and Ms. Sonam contain details about the surprise Dogra invasion of Ladakh.

The chronicles also cover the first-millennium presence of Buddhism, the growth of Buddhism in the first half of the second millennium, and the introduction of Islam in the 16th century.

=== Treaty of Tingmosgang (1684) ===
The first publication of the Ladakh Chronicles' summary of the 1684 Treaty of Tingmosgang appeared as an appendix to a book by Henry Ramsay. It is held that Prime Minister Desi Sangye Gyatso of Tibet and the King Delek Namgyal of Ladakh agreed on the Treaty of Tingmosgang (sometimes called the "Treaty of Temisgam") in the fortress of Tingmosgang at the conclusion of the Tibet–Ladakh–Mughal War in 1684. The original text of the Treaty of Tingmosgang no longer survives, but its contents are summarized in the Ladakh Chronicles.

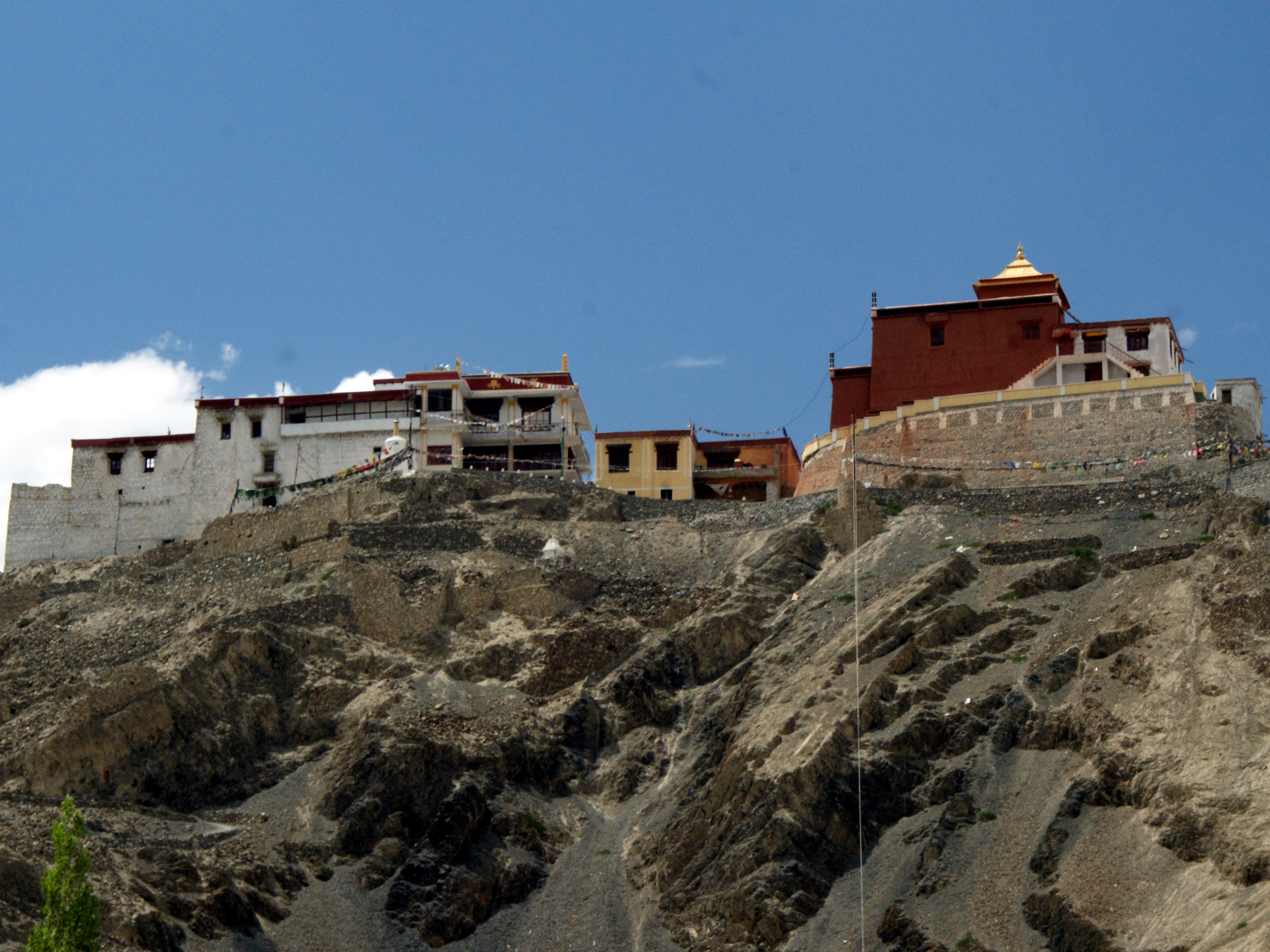
Monastery of Tingmosgang

The summary contained in the Ladakh Chronicles includes six main clauses of the treaty:

1. A general declaration of principle that the region of Guge (mNa'-ris-sKorgSum) was divided into three separate kingdoms in the 10th century;
2. The Tibetan recognition of the independence of Ladakh and the restriction for the King of Ladakh from inviting foreign armies into Ladakh;
3. The regulation of trade of goat-wool, subdivided into two subclauses, for Guge and the northern plain of Tibet (Byaṅ-thaṅ);
4. A clause fixing the Ladakh-Tibet frontier at the Lha-ri stream at Demchok, but granting Ladakh an enclave at Men-ser;
5. Another clause regulating Ladakh-Tibet trade;
6. The arrangement of a fee to Mi-'pham dBaṅ-po (then-regent of Ladakh) for his cost in arranging the treaty.

The trade regulations provided for Ladakh's exclusive right to trade in pashmina wool produced in Tibet, in exchange for brick-tea from Ladakh. Ladakh was also bound to send periodic missions to Lhasa carrying presents for the Dalai Lama. The fee in the sixth clause was later paid by Desi Sangye Gyatso to Mi-'pham dBaii-po in the form of three estates in Tibet sometime between the autumn of 1684 and 1685.
