= Tashi Namgyal I =

16th-century King of Ladakh

Tashi Namgyal
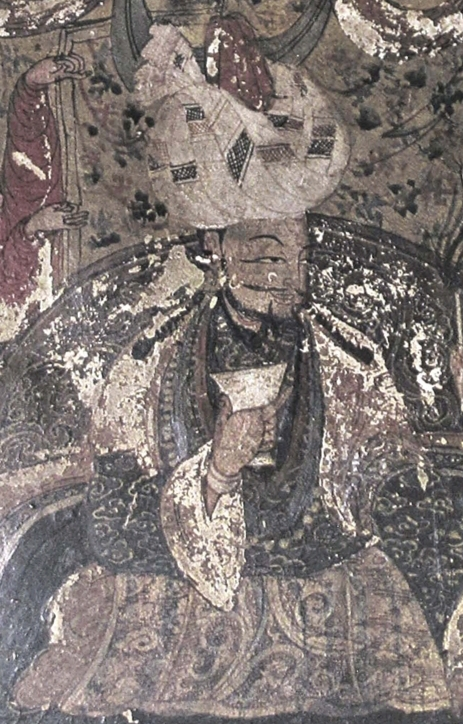

Gyalpo of Ladakh
- Reign: c. 1555–1575
- Predecessor: Lhawang Namgyal
- Successor: Tsewang Namgyal I
- House: Namgyal dynasty
- Religion: Tibetan Buddhism

Tashi Namgyal (reigned c. 1555 – 1575) was a ruler of the Namgyal dynasty of Ladakh. He is known for strengthening the kingdom’s defences and for repelling incursions by Central Asian raiders.

== Reign ==
The king is credited with:

- Repelling raids from Central Asia.
- Consolidating control over areas such as Kargil and parts of Guge.
- Strengthening fortifications in Leh, notably the Namgyal Tsemo fort and monastery.
- Supporting Buddhist monastic establishments.

== Architecture ==
Tashi Namgyal founded or restored the Namgyal Tsemo Monastery above Leh, a strategic fort and temple complex which still stands today. He is also associated with the expansion of Phyang Monastery.

== Succession ==
Having no direct heirs, he arranged for his brother's marriage, and his nephew Tsewang Namgyal I succeeded him after his death around 1575.

== Legacy ==
Historians regard Tashi Namgyal as a capable ruler who combined military leadership with cultural patronage. His constructions remain important heritage sites in modern Ladakh.

== See also ==
- Namgyal dynasty of Ladakh
