= Treaty of Tingmosgang =

Peace agreement between Ladakh and Tibet

- Type: Peace treaty
- Context: Conflict resolution between Ladakh and Tibet
- Signed: 1684; 342 years ago
- Location: Tingmosgang, Ladakh
- Mediators: Mee-pham-wang-po
- Signatories: Delek Namgyal (Gyalpo of Ladakh); Desi Sangye Gyatso (Kalon of Tibet)
- Parties: Kingdom of Ladakh; Government of Tibet
- Languages: Classical Tibetan; Ladakhi

The Treaty of Tingmosgang (Tibetan: གཏིང་མོ་སྒང་འགྲེལ་ཚན, Wylie: Tingmosgang 'drel tshan), also known as the Treaty of Temisgam, was a tripartite peace agreement signed in 1684 between the Kingdom of Ladakh and the Ganden Phodrang of Tibet, with the support of the Qing dynasty, at the end of the Tibet–Ladakh–Mughal war. The original text of the Treaty of Tingmosgang no longer survives, but its contents are summarized in the Ladakh Chronicles. The treaty contained clauses that established diplomatic relations, delineated borders, and regulated trade between Ladakh and Tibet.

== Background ==
The origins of the conflict between Ladakh and Tibet date back to the mid-17th century. Ladakh, a kingdom nestled in the Himalayas, was strategically located along key trade routes connecting Tibet, Central Asia, and the Indian subcontinent. During the reign of king Sengge Namgyal (r. 1616–1642), Ladakh had expanded its territories, leading to tensions with Tibet. These tensions were further heightened by religious differences, as Ladakh followed Tibetan Buddhism, but the ruling Gelug school of Tibet sought dominance over other Tibetan Buddhist sects, which Ladakh supported.

In 1679, the 5th Dalai Lama's regent, Desi Sangye Gyatso, sent Tibetan forces to invade Ladakh. This led to the Tibet–Ladakh–Mughal War (1679–1684), during which the Tibetan forces occupied Leh and laid siege to Basgo. Ladakh, under king Delek Namgyal, sought assistance from the Mughal Empire. The combined forces then defeated the Tibetan army in 1683 causing the latter to withdraw to Tashigang.

=== Negotiations ===
According to the Ladakh Chronicles, Prime Minister Desi Sangye Gyatso of Tibet and the King Delek Namgyal of Ladakh agreed on the 'Treaty of Tingmosgang in the fortress of Tingmosgang at the conclusion of the Tibet–Ladakh–Mughal War in 1684.

The treaty was mediated by the Qing dynasty of China, which was interested in maintaining stability along its western borders and ensuring Tibetan allegiance. The terms of the treaty were written in both Classical Tibetan and Ladakhi languages, with Qing mediation confirming the final agreement.

== Text ==
The original text of the Treaty of Tingmosgang no longer survives, but its contents are summarized in the Ladakh Chronicles.

An English translation of the summary reads:

1. The boundaries fixed, in the beginning, when king Skyed-Ida-ngeema-gon gave a kingdom to each of his three sons, shall still be maintained.

2. Only Ladakis shall be permitted to enter into Ngarees-khor-sum wool trade.

3. No person from Ladak, except the royal trader of the Ladak Court, shall be permitted to enter Rudok.

4. A royal trader shall be sent by the Deywa Zhung (i.e. the Grand Lama of Lhasa), from Lhasa to Ladak, once a year, with 200 horse-loads of tea.

5. A "Lo-chhak" shall be sent every third year from Leh to Lhasa with presents. As regards the quality and value of presents brought for all ordinary Lamas, the matter is of no consequence, but to the Labrang Chhakdzot shall be given the following articles, viz:

(a) Gold dust - the weight of 1 zho 10 times.

(b) Saffron - the weight of 1 srang (or thoorsrang) 10 times.

(c) Yarkhand cotton cloths - 6 pieces. (d) Thin cotton cloth - 1 piece.

The members of the Lapchak Mission shall be provided with provisions, free of cost, during their stay at Lhasa, and for the journey they shall be similarly provided with 200 baggage animals, 25 riding ponies, and 10 servants. For the uninhabited portion of the journey, tents will be supplied for the use of the Mission.

6. The country of Ngaress-khor-sum shall be given to the Omniscient Drukpa Lama, Mee-pham-wang-po, and in lieu thereof the Deywa Zhung wil give to the Ladak king three other districts (in Great Tibet).

7. The revenue of the Ngarees-khor-sum shall be set aside for the purpose of defraying the cost of sacrificial lamps, and of religious ceremonies to be performed at Lhasa.

8. But the king of Ladak reserves to himself the village (or district?) of Monthser (i.e. Minsar) in Ngarees-khor-sum, that he may be independent there; and he sets aside its revenue for the purpose of meeting the expense involved in keeping up the sacrificial lights at Kang-ree (i.e. Kailas), and the Holy Lakes of Manasarwar and Rakas Tal.

With reference to the first clause of the treaty, it may be explained that, roughly speaking, king Skyed-Ida-ngeema-gon gave the following territories to his sons:

a. To the eldest son - The countries now known as Ladak and Purig extending from Hanley on the east to the Zojila Pass on the west, and including Rudok and the Gogpo gold district.

b. To the second son - Goo gey, Poorang and certain other small districts.

c. To the third son - Zangskar, Spiti, and certain other small districts.

== Terms ==
The summary of the treaty contained in the Ladakh Chronicles includes six main clauses:

1. A general declaration of principle that the region of Ngari Khorsum was divided into three separate kingdoms in the 10th century;
2. The Tibetan recognition of the independence of Ladakh and the obligation on the King of Ladakh from inviting foreign armies into his kingdom;
3. The regulation of trade of goat-wool, subdivided into two subclauses, for Guge and the northern plain of Tibet (Changthang);
4. A clause fixing the Ladakh–Tibet frontier at the Lhari stream at Demchok, but granting Ladakh an enclave at Menser;
5. Another clause regulating Ladakh–Tibet trade;
6. The arrangement of a fee to the Drukpa lama Mi-'pham dBaṅ-po for his cost in mediating the treaty.

=== Border delineation ===
The treaty defined the boundary between Ladakh and Tibet. The border was to be respected by both sides, ensuring peace and stability in the region. Historian Alastair Lamb described the border delineation from the treaty as imprecise, writing that there are "no means of determining exactly what line of frontier was contemplated in 1684" and that it is "singularly deficient in precise geographical detail".

=== Trade regulations ===
The trade regulations provided for Ladakh's exclusive right to trade in pashmina wool produced in Tibet, in exchange for brick-tea from Ladakh. Ladakh was also bound to send periodic missions to Lhasa carrying presents for the Dalai Lama. The treaty allowed for continued trade between Ladakh, Tibet, and surrounding regions, including Kashmir and Central Asia. Ladakh was a critical point along the Silk Road, and the agreement secured Ladakh's position as a trade intermediary, bringing prosperity to the region.

=== Tributary status ===
Ladakh agreed to pay tribute to Tibet in the form of annual offerings, which symbolized Ladakh's subordination to Tibet. However, Ladakh retained significant autonomy in internal matters, including its governance and religious affairs.

=== Buddhist Relations ===
The treaty reaffirmed Ladakh's right to practice and promote its Tibetan Buddhist traditions, while recognizing the influence of the Gelug school of Tibetan Buddhism. This ensured that Ladakh would not face religious persecution or forced conversions to the Gelugpa sect.

== Aftermath ==
The fee in the sixth clause was later paid by Desi Sangye Gyatso to Mi-'pham dBaii-po in the form of three estates in Tibet sometime between the autumn of 1684 and 1685.

The Treaty of Tingmosgang had a lasting influence on the geopolitics of the Himalayan region. It helped stabilize the relationship between Ladakh and Tibet for over a century and contributed to regional peace.

== Bibliography ==
- Ahmad, Zahiruddin (September–December 1968). "New Light on the Tibet-Ladakh-Mughal War of 1679-84". East and West. 18 (3/4). Instituto Italiano per l'Africa e l'Oriente: 340–361. JSTOR 29755343.
- Emmer, Gerhard (2007). "Dga' Ldan Tshe Dbang Dpal Bzang Po and the Tibet-Ladakh-Mughal War of 1679-84". Proceedings of the Tenth Seminar of the IATS, 2003. Volume 9: The Mongolia-Tibet Interface: Opening New Research Terrains in Inner Asia. BRILL. pp. 81–108. ISBN 978-90-474-2171-9.
- Gardner, Kyle J. (2021). "Territory before Borderlines". The Frontier Complex: Geopolitics and the Making of the India-China Border, 1846–1962. Cambridge University Press. pp. 26–59. doi:10.1017/9781108886444.003. ISBN 978-1-108-84059-0.
- Lamb, Alastair (1965). "Treaties, Maps and the Western Sector of the Sino-Indian Boundary Dispute" (PDF). The Australian Year Book of International Law: 37–52.
- Petech, Luciano (1977). The Kingdom of Ladakh, c. 950–1842 A.D. Instituto Italiano Per il Medio ed Estremo Oriente – via archive.org.
