= Karl Marx (medical missionary) =

German medical missionary and Tibetologist (1857–1891)

Karl Rudolf Marx (1857 – Ladakh, 1891) was a German eye doctor who was the first Moravian medical missionary in Tibet. He was also a Tibetologist and translated parts of the Ladakh Chronicles into German, improving on the work of Emil Schlagintweit.

Marx and his two children died of typhoid in Leh in 1891, his wife survived and returned to Herrnhut.
