= Lhachen Bhagan =

Gyalpo of Ladakh from 1460 to 1485

Gyalpo of Ladakh
- Reign: 1460–1485
- Successor: Lhachen Lhadban Namygal
- House: Namgyal dynasty of Ladakh
- Religion: Buddhism

Lhachen Bhagan was a Basgo king who united Ladakh in 1460 by overthrowing the king of Leh. He took on the surname Namgyal (meaning victorious) and founded the Namgyal dynasty of Ladakh.

== Founding of the Namgyal dynasty ==
According to the Ladakh Chronicles, Bhagan was the son of Bhara in the kingdom of Maryul. Bhagan was described as warlike, and established the Namgyal dynasty in 1460 after he formed an alliance with the people of Shey and dethroned the Maryul king Blo-gros-mc-og-ldan and his brothers drun-pa A-li and Slab-bstan-dar-rgyas.

Lhachen Bhagan Namgyal dynasty of Ladakh
Regnal titles
Preceded by Blo-gros-mc-og-ldan	Ruler of Ladakh; 1460–1485	Succeeded by Lhachen Lhadban Namygal
