= Jamyang Namgyal =

Gyalpo of Ladakh
- Reign: 1595–1616
- Predecessor: Namgyal Gonpo
- Successor: Sengge Namgyal
- Spouse: Tsering Gyalmo; Gyal Khatun
- Issue: Sengge Namgyal; Mandok Gyalmo; Lhawang Namgyal; Stanzin Namgyal
- House: Namgyal
- Father: Tsewang Namgyal
- Religion: Buddhism

Jamyang Namgyal (Ladakhi: འཇམ་དབྱངས་རྣམ་རྒྱལ, Wylie: ʻjam dbyangs rnam rgyal, died 1616) was a 17th-century Namgyal dynasty king (gyalpo) of Ladakh from 1595 till his death in 1616. He was succeeded by his son Sengge Namgyal in the year 1616.

== Biography ==
Jamyang Namgyal was born to and was the eldest son of Tsewang Namgyal who was the king of Ladakh from 1575 to 1595. He became the Gyalpo of Ladakh in 1595 and continued to be in power until his death in 1616. Jamyang Namgyal was married to Gyal Khatun, a Balti princess.

=== Battle with Ali Senge Anchan ===
Jamyang Namgyal during his reign decided to support the Sultan of Chigtan and to capture Skardu, the capital of Maqpon king Ali Senge Anchan. Namgyal's army was crossing the mountain passes towards Purig during the winter season where his troops disappeared due to a violent storm. Anchan's well trained army attacked Namgyal's army on the way and held them there until all the passes and valleys were blocked with snow; compelling Namgyal to surrender. Namgyal was imprisoned by Ali Sher Khan in Skardu. Anchan then attacked Ladakh, took control of Leh, its capital, and destroyed some historical monuments and records. After returning to Skardu, Anchan established a marital alliance with Namgyal; accordingly a Balti princess (variously described as a daughter of Anchan's ally and raja of Khaplu, Yabgo Shey Gilazi, or Anchan himself) was married to Namgyal while Anchan married a daughter of Namgyal Mandok Gyalmo. Afterwards Namgyal was allowed to return to Ladakh.

== See also ==
- Namgyal dynasty of Ladakh

Jamyang Namgyal Namgyal dynasty of Ladakh
Regnal titles
Preceded by Namgyal Gonpo	Ruler of Ladakh; 1595–1616	Succeeded by Sengge Namgyal
