= Stok Monastery =

Buddhist monastery in Ladakh, northern India

Stok Palace
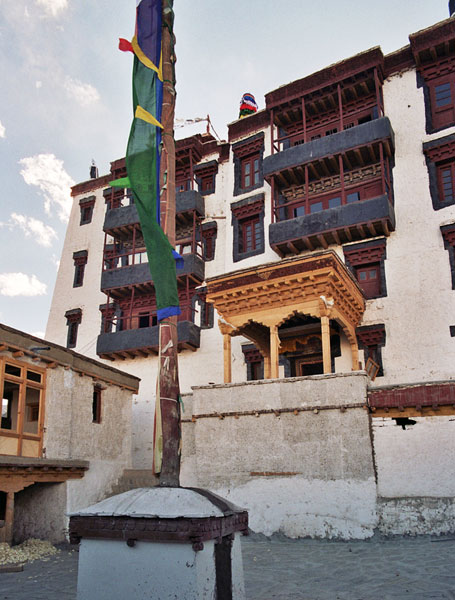
- Stok Palace

- Location within India

Religion
- Affiliation: Tibetan Buddhism

Location
- Location: Stok, Leh district Ladakh, India
- Country: India
- Interactive map of Stok Palace
- Coordinates: 34°3′56.5″N 77°32′32″E

Architecture
- Founder: Lhawang Lotus
- Established: 14th century CE
- Completed: Late 14th century

Stok Monastery or Stok Gompa is a Buddhist monastery in Stok, Leh district, Ladakh, northern India, 15 kilometres south of Leh. It was founded by Lama Lhawang Lotus in the 14th Century and has a notable library including all 108 volumes of the Kangyur. A ritual dance-mask festival is held annually.

Next to the monastery is a 71-foot (22 m) high seated Gautama Buddha statue and temple, constructed between 2012-2015 and consecrated by the 14th Dalai Lama on 8 August 2016.

Around 2 km from the monastery is Stok Palace, built in 1820 as the summer home of Ladakhi royalty from the Namgyal dynasty of Ladakh.

== Stok Guru Tsechu festival ==
Stok Guru Tsechu, a major annual two-day monastic festival celebrated in Stok 15–20 km south of Leh held on the 9th and 10th day of the first month of the Tibetan lunar calendar, typically falling in February or March.

== Gallery ==
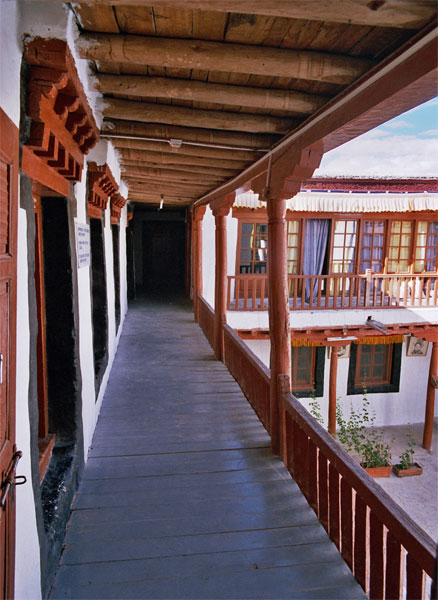

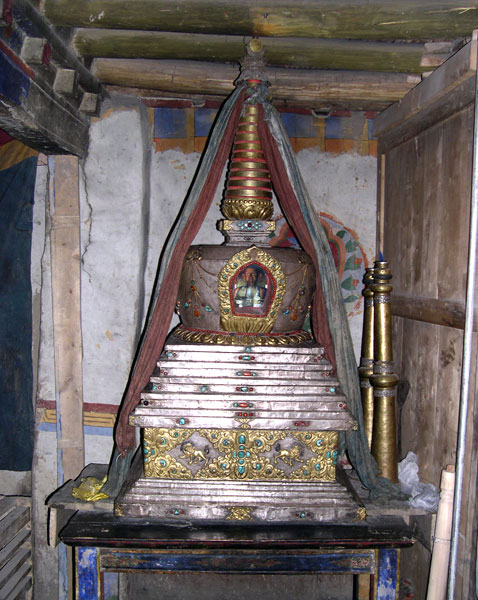

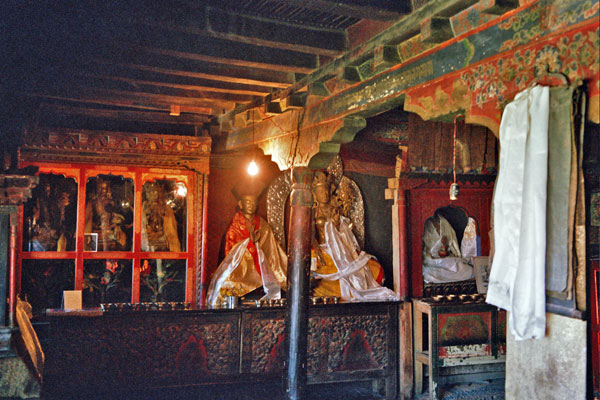

== See also ==
- Chogyal
- List of buddhist monasteries in Ladakh
- Geography of Ladakh
- Tourism in Ladakh
- World Monuments Fund
