= Lhachen Utpala =

Lhachen Utpala (c. 1080–1110) was an early ruler of Ladakh. He is mentioned in the Ladakhi Chronicles as is his advancement upon the Tibetan territory of Kulu. He expanded his kingdom up to the realms of Purang and Mustang in present-day Nepal.
