= Stok =

Stok Stak
- Village
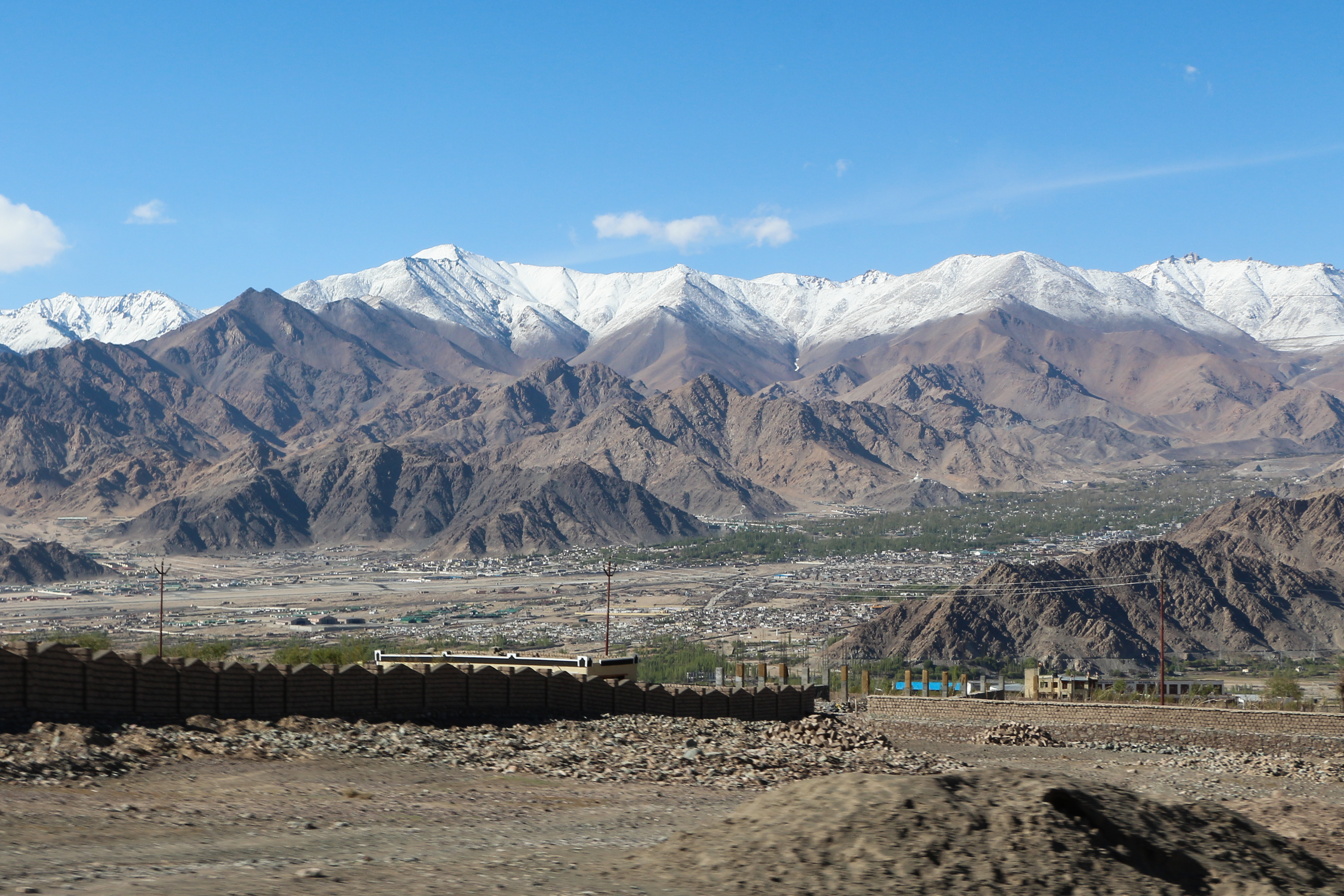
- Stok Village

- Location in Ladakh, India Stok (India)
- Coordinates: 34.06441°N 77.553344°E
- Country: India
- Union Territory: Ladakh
- District: Leh
- Tehsil: Chushot
- Elevation: 3,497 m (11,473 ft)

Population (2011)
  - Total: 1,471
- Time zone: UTC+5:30 (IST)
- 2011 census code: 862

Stok is a village in the Leh district of Ladakh, India. It is located in the Chushot tehsil, in the Indus Valley 17 km southeast of the Leh town.

The village is home to the 14th-century Stok Monastery, with its 71 feet (22 m) high seated Gautama Buddha statue, constructed between 2012 and 2015 and consecrated by the Dalai Lama on 8 August 2016.

Stok's 19th-century palace is the current residence of the former royal family of Ladakh. Within the palace, a museum contains the shrine, crown, ceremonial dress and jewellery of the Ladakhi king.

Stok Kangri (6,153 metres (20,187 ft)) sits at the head of the Stok Chu river valley.

Siddhartha School is located at the northernmost edge of the village.

== Geography ==
Stok is located at 34.07°N 77.57°E. It has an average elevation of 3,364 metres (11,037 ft).

== Demographics ==
According to the 2011 census of India, Stok has 300 households. The effective literacy rate (i.e. the literacy rate of population excluding children aged 6 and below) is 73.79%.

Demographics (2011 Census)
| | Total | Male | Female |
|---|---|---|---|
| Population | 1471 | 706 | 765 |
| Children aged below 6 years | 151 | 72 | 79 |
| Scheduled caste | 4 | 2 | 2 |
| Scheduled tribe | 1457 | 697 | 760 |
| Literates | 974 | 513 | 461 |
| Workers (all) | 589 | 389 | 200 |
| Main workers (total) | 529 | 345 | 184 |
| Main workers: Cultivators | 209 | 136 | 73 |
| Main workers: Agricultural labourers | 2 | 1 | 1 |
| Main workers: Household industry workers | 6 | 6 | 0 |
| Main workers: Other | 312 | 202 | 110 |
| Marginal workers (total) | 60 | 44 | 16 |
| Marginal workers: Cultivators | 24 | 17 | 7 |
| Marginal workers: Agricultural labourers | 5 | 2 | 3 |
| Marginal workers: Household industry workers | 1 | 1 | 0 |
| Marginal workers: Others | 30 | 24 | 6 |
| Non-workers | 882 | 317 | 565 |

== See also ==
- Chogyal
- History of Stok
- Dogra–Tibetan War
- Zhabdrung
- Tourism in Ladakh
