= Tibet–Ladakh–Mughal war =

1679–1684 conflict

| Date | 1679–1684 |
| Location | Guge, Ladakh |
| Result | Mughal–Ladakh victory: Treaty of Tingmosgang; Tibetan recognition of the independence of Ladakh |
| Territorial changes | Ladakh reduced to its present day borders |

Belligerents
| Qing China; Ganden Phodrang; Khoshut Tibet; Supported by: Bushahr Kingdom | Mughal Empire; Kashmir Subah; Namgyal Ladakh; Supported by: Zhabdrung Bhutan; Kullu Kingdom |

Commanders and leaders
| Lobsang Gyatso; Galdan Tsewang | Fidai Khan; Delek Namgyal |

The Tibet–Ladakh–Mughal war of 1679–1684 was fought between the Central Tibetan Ganden Phodrang government, with the assistance of the Oirat Mongol Khoshut Khanate, and the Namgyal dynasty of Ladakh with the assistance from the Mughal Empire in Kashmir.

In the late 17th century, Ladakh sided with Bhutan in its dispute with Tibet. The Tibetans retaliated by invading Ladakh for interfering in their relations with Bhutan and the oppression of Gelug monasteries in Ladakh. The Tibetan invasion ultimately ended in failure, and the subsequent treaty in 1684 finalised the Ladakhi–Tibetan border, recognised Ladakhi independence by Tibet.

== War ==
In 1679, the Fifth Dalai Lama appointed the lama of the Tashilhunpo Monastery, the Koshut Galdan Tsewang (Wylie: Dga' ldan Tshe dbang), as the commander of the Tibeto-Khoshut expedition to Ladakh. He is said to have done so against the advice of his prime minister not to send the expedition. Galdan Tsewang first secured his flanks when he made a treaty with Raja Kehri Singh of Bashahr, granting him trade rights with Tibet.

Galdan Tsewang's first campaign resulted in the defeat of the Ladakhi army led by Shakya Gyatso (Wylie: Sakya rGya-mTsho, at Khan-dMar. The following year, he defeated the Ladakhis again at Chang La (Byan-la) and occupied the country with the exception of the fortresses of Basgo, and Tinggmosgang, which held out against the Tibetan attacks for the next three years.

The stalemate was broken with the Mughal Empire's intervention in the war. Kashmir was a Mughal province at this time and included Ladakh in its sphere of influence. In 1683, an army led by Fidai Khan, son of governor Ibrahim Khan of Kashmir, defeated the Tibeto-Khoshut army and lifted the siege of Basgo, continuing the pursuit until Lake Pangong. The Mughal–Ladakh alliance managed to force the Tibetan to withdraw into Tashigang.

The Kashmiris helped restore Ladakhi rule on the condition that a mosque be built in Leh and that the Ladakhi king convert to Islam. The Mughals retreated after signing a treaty with the Ladakhis. The Kashmiri historians assert that, after this, the Ladakhi king converted to Islam in return. However, the Ladakhi chronicles do not mention such a thing and the Ladakhi people refute it. The king agreed to give tribute to the Mughals in return for their help.

Johan Elverskog writes that in his struggle for power over Tibet, the Fifth Dalai Lama employed fear and violence over the Tibetan territories.

== Treaty of Tingmosgang ==
In 1684, the Ganden Phodrang Prime Minister Desi Sangye Gyatso and the King Delek Namgyal of Ladakh signed the 1684 Treaty of Tingmosgang to end the war. According to the Ladakh Chronicles, the treaty fixed the Tibet-Ladakh border at the Lhari stream near Demchok, and regulated trade and tribute missions between Ladakh to Tibet.

== See also ==
- Dogra–Tibetan war
