= Namgyal dynasty of Ladakh =

Monarchs of the former Ladakh kingdom

Namgyal dynasty of Ladakh Gyalpo of Ladakh
- 1460–1842
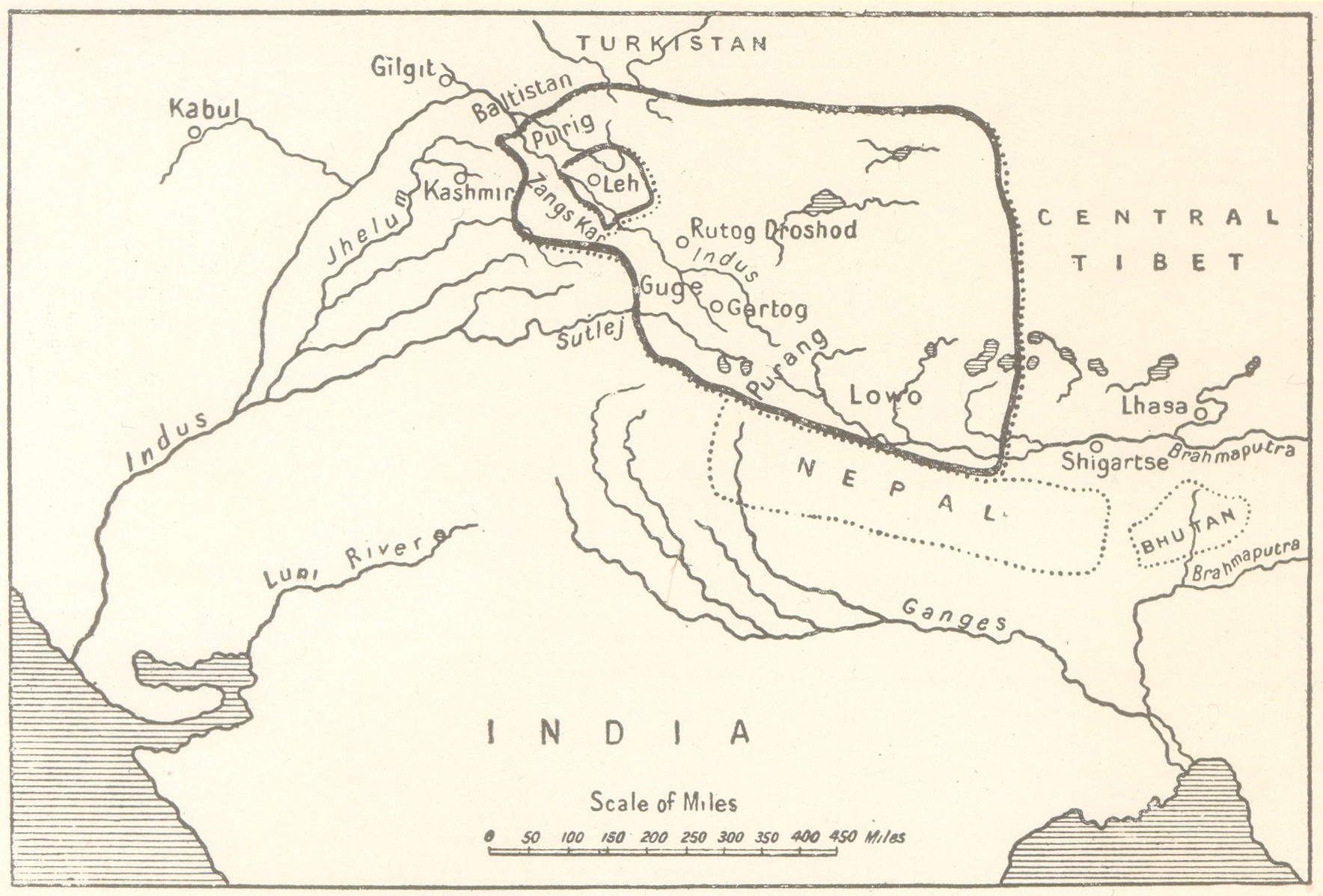
- Historical map of Ladakh at its largest extent
- Capital: Leh
- Common languages: Ladakhi, Tibetan
- Religion: Tibetan Buddhism
- Government: Monarchy
- History
  - Established: 1460
  - Disestablished: 1842
| Preceded by | Succeeded by |
| First dynasty of Maryul | Sikh Empire; Jammu and Kashmir (princely state) |
- Today part of: India (Ladakh); China; Pakistan; Nepal

The Namgyal dynasty was a dynasty whose rulers were the monarchs of the former kingdom of Ladakh that lasted from 1460 to 1842 and were titled the Gyalpo of Ladakh. The Namgyal dynasty succeeded the first dynasty of Maryul and had several conflicts with the neighboring Mughal Empire and various dynasties of Tibet, including the Tibet–Ladakh–Mughal War. The dynasty eventually fell to the Sikh Empire and Dogras of Jammu. Most of its known history is written in the Ladakh Chronicles.

== History ==
=== Founding ===
According to the Ladakh Chronicles, the Namgyal dynasty was founded by Bhagan, the son of Bhara in the kingdom of Maryul. Bhagan was described as warlike, and established the Namgyal dynasty in 1460 after he formed an alliance with the people of Leh and dethroned the Maryul king Lodrö Chokden (Blo-gros-mc'og-ldan) and his brothers Drünpa Aliand Lapten Dargyé (Slab-bstan-dar-rgyas).

He took the surname Namgyal (meaning victorious) and founded a new dynasty which still survives today. King Tashi Namgyal (1555–1575) managed to repel most Central Asian raiders, and built a royal fort on the top of the Namgyal Peak. Tsewang Namgyal (1575–1595) extended his kingdom as far as Nepal.

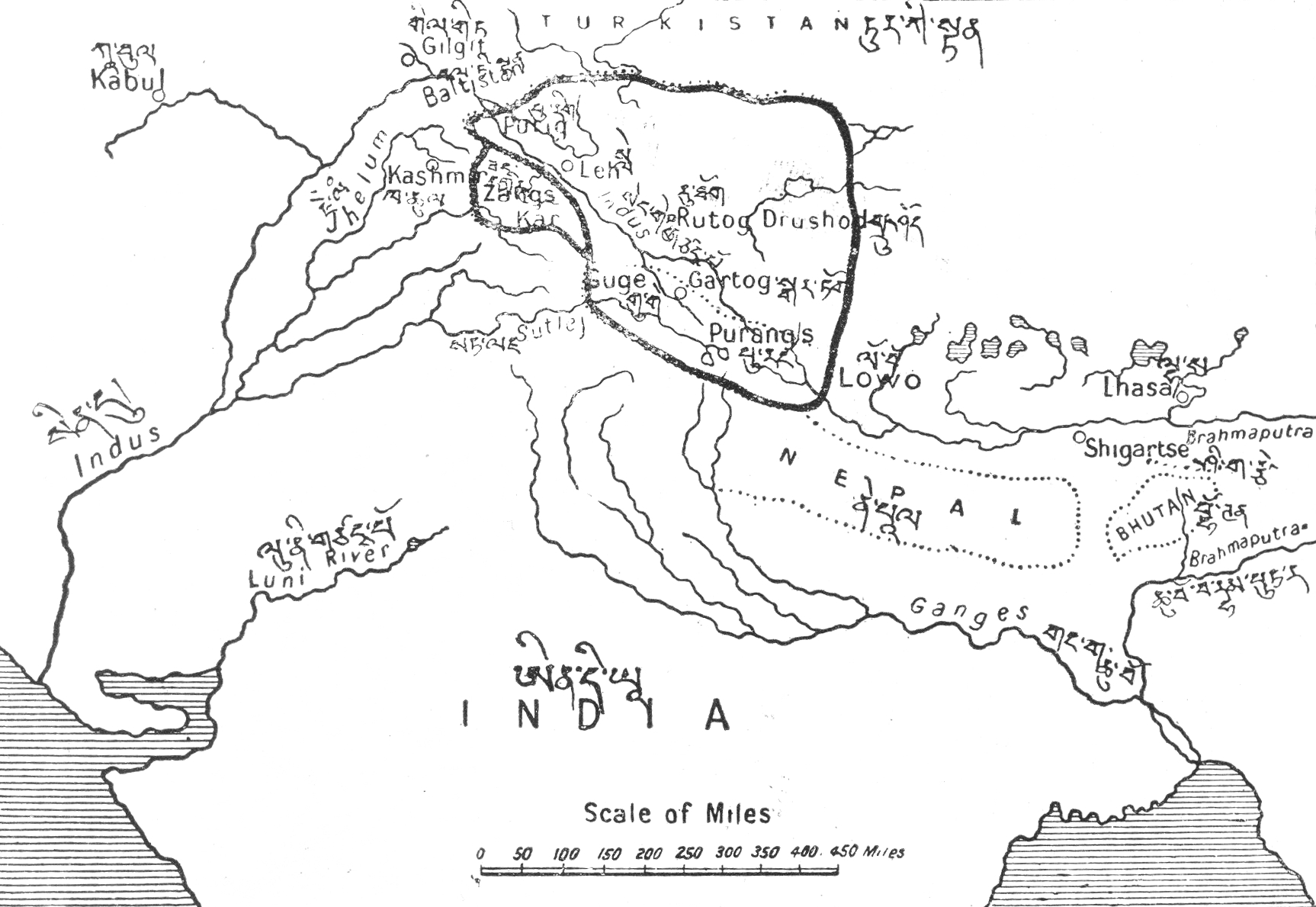
The Empire of King Nyimagon in Western Tibet about 975-1000 AD. The eldest son Palgyimon received the bulk of the empire under the name Maryul, based in Leh.

Sengge Namgyal (r. 1616-1642), known as the "Lion" King, made efforts to restore Ladakh to its old glory by an ambitious and energetic building program including the Leh Palace and the rebuilding of several gompas, the most famous of which are Hemis and Hanle.

He expanded the kingdom into Zanskar and Spiti, but was defeated by the Mughals, who had already occupied Kashmir and Baltistan. His son Deldan Namgyal (1642–1694) had to placate the Mughal emperor Aurangzeb by building a mosque in Leh. However, he defeated the Mughal army in Baltistan. His son Delek sided with Bhutan in a religious dispute between Tibet and Bhutan, which resulted in an invasion by the Fifth Dalai Lama. Delek Namgyal sought assistance from the Mughal Empire who drove out the Tibetan forces. The Mughuls withdrew after being paid off by the 5th Dalai Lama.

Following the Tibet–Ladakh conflict, the Treaty of Tingmosgang of 1684 allowed the Namgyal rulers of Ladakh to retain Minsar (Menser), an enclave in western Tibet. Revenue associated with the settlement was reserved for religious offerings at Mount Kailash and Lake Manasarovar.

=== Downfall ===
The Namgyal dynasty ended in 1842 after an invasion of Ladakh by the Dogra general Zorawar Singh and its subsequent annexation.

By the beginning of the 19th century, the Mughal empire had collapsed and Sikh rule had been established in Punjab and Kashmir. However the Dogra region of Jammu remained under its Rajput rulers (who ruled under the maharaja ranjit singh) Rajput ruler were given the control of their states but under the name of Punjab and they were part of khalsa empire, General Zorawar Singh invaded Ladakh in 1834. King Tshespal Namgyal was dethroned and exiled to Stok where they still had a small jagir until the post independence political integration of India.

== List of kings ==
=== Gyalpo of Ladakh ===
The kings of Namgyal dynasty along with their periods of reign are as follows:

- Lhachen Bhagan (c. 1460-1485)
- Unknown (c. 1485-1510)
- Lata Jughdan (c. 1510-1535)
- Kunga Namgyal I (c. 1535-1555)
- Tashi Namgyal I ('BKra‐śis‐rnam‐rgyal, c. 1555-1575) son
- Tsewang Namgyal I (Ts'e-dbaṅ‐rnam‐rgyal, c. 1575-1595) nephew
- Namgyal Gonpo (rNam-rgyal-mgon-po, c. 1595-1600) brother
- Jamyang Namgyal (Jams-dbyang-rnam-rgyal, c. 1595-1616) brother
- Sengge Namgyal (Seng-ge-rnam-rgyal, first time, 1616–1623) son
- Norbu Namgyal (1623–1624) brother
- Sengge Namgyal (second time, 1624–1642)
- Deldan Namgyal (Bde-ldan-rnam-rgyal, 1647–1694) son
- Delek Namgyal (Bde-legs-rnam-rgyal, 1678–1691) son (prince regent)
- Nyima Namgyal (Ñi-ma-rnam-rgyal, 1691–1729) son
- Deskyong Namgyal (Bde‐skyoṅ‐rnam‐rgyal, 1729–1739) son
- Phuntsog Namgyal (P'un‐ts'ogs‐rnam‐rgyal, 1739–1753) son
- Tsewang Namgyal II (Ts'e‐dbaṅ-rnam‐rgyal, 1753–1782) son
- Tseten Namgyal (Ts'e‐brtan‐rnam‐rgyal, 1782-1802) son
- Tsepal Dondup Namgyal (Ts'e‐dpal‐don‐grub‐rnam‐rgyal, 1802–1837, 1839–1840) brother
- Kunga Namgyal II (Kun‐dga'‐rnam‐rgyal, 1840–1842) grandson

=== Titular ===
- Sonam Namgyal
- Jigmet Dadul Namgyal (until 1949)
- Kunzang Namgyal (1949–1974)
- Jigmed Wangchuk Namgyal (1974–present, current titular holder)

== Gallery ==
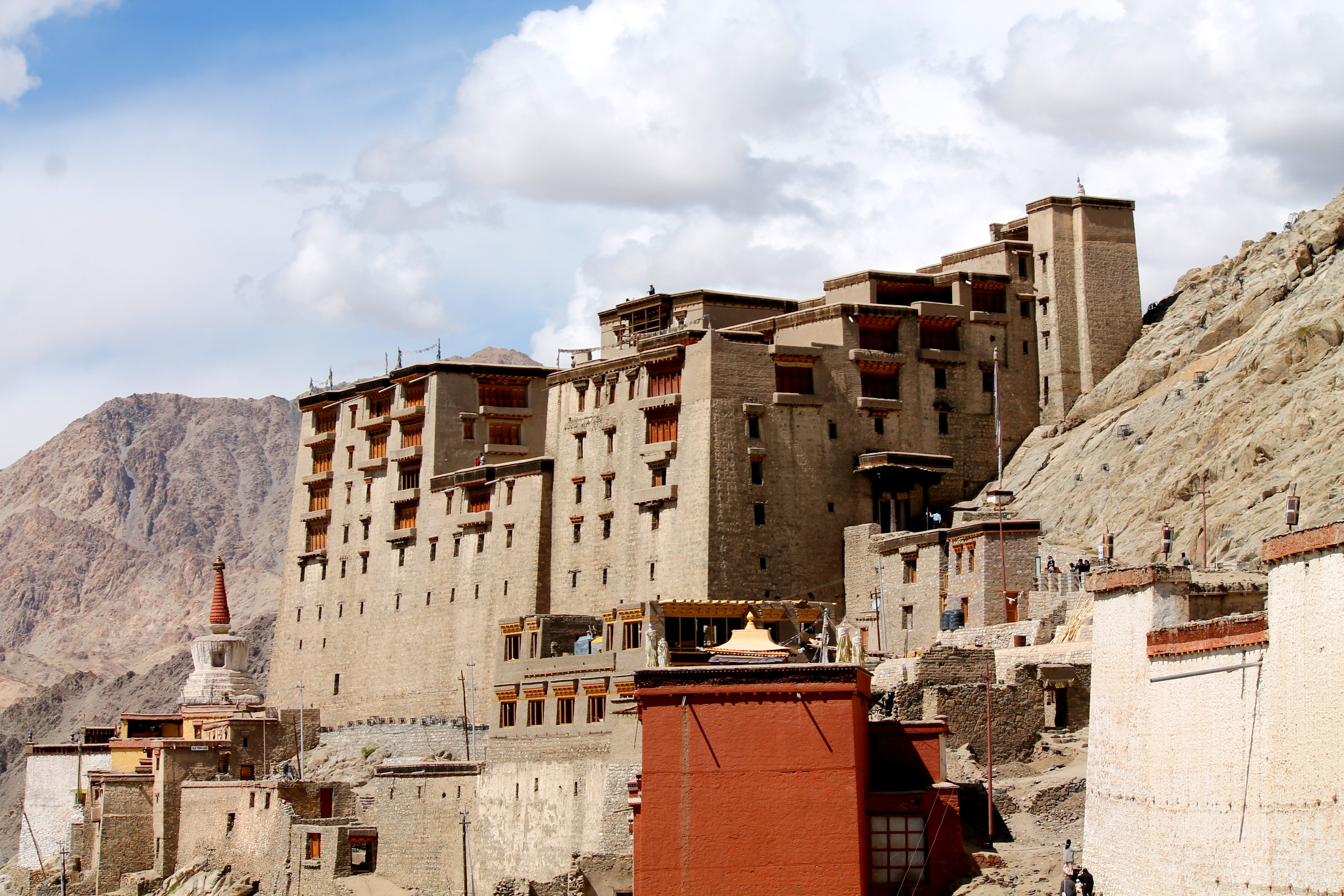
Leh Palace

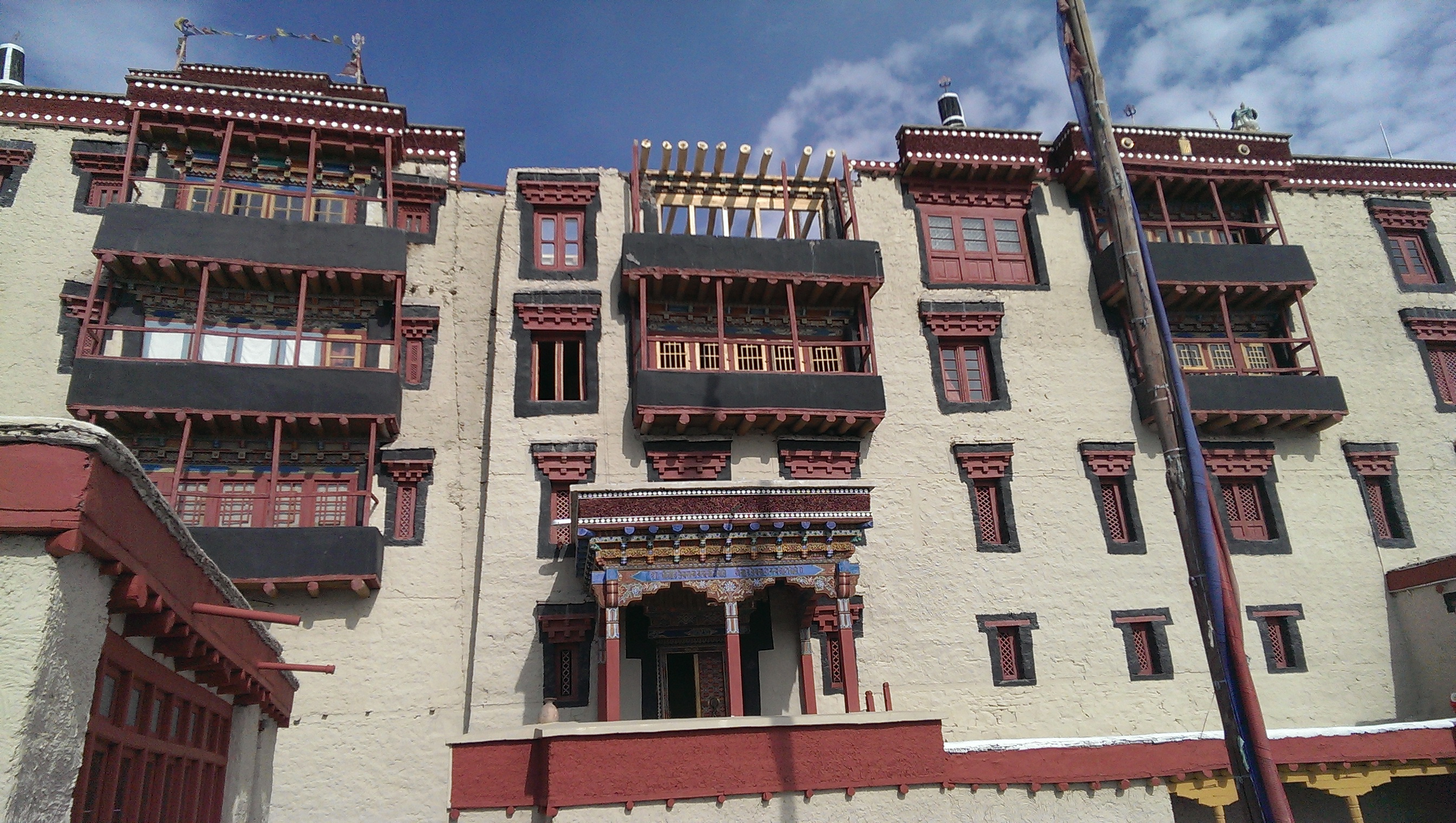
The Stok Royal Palace, residence of the descendants of Namgyal dynasty

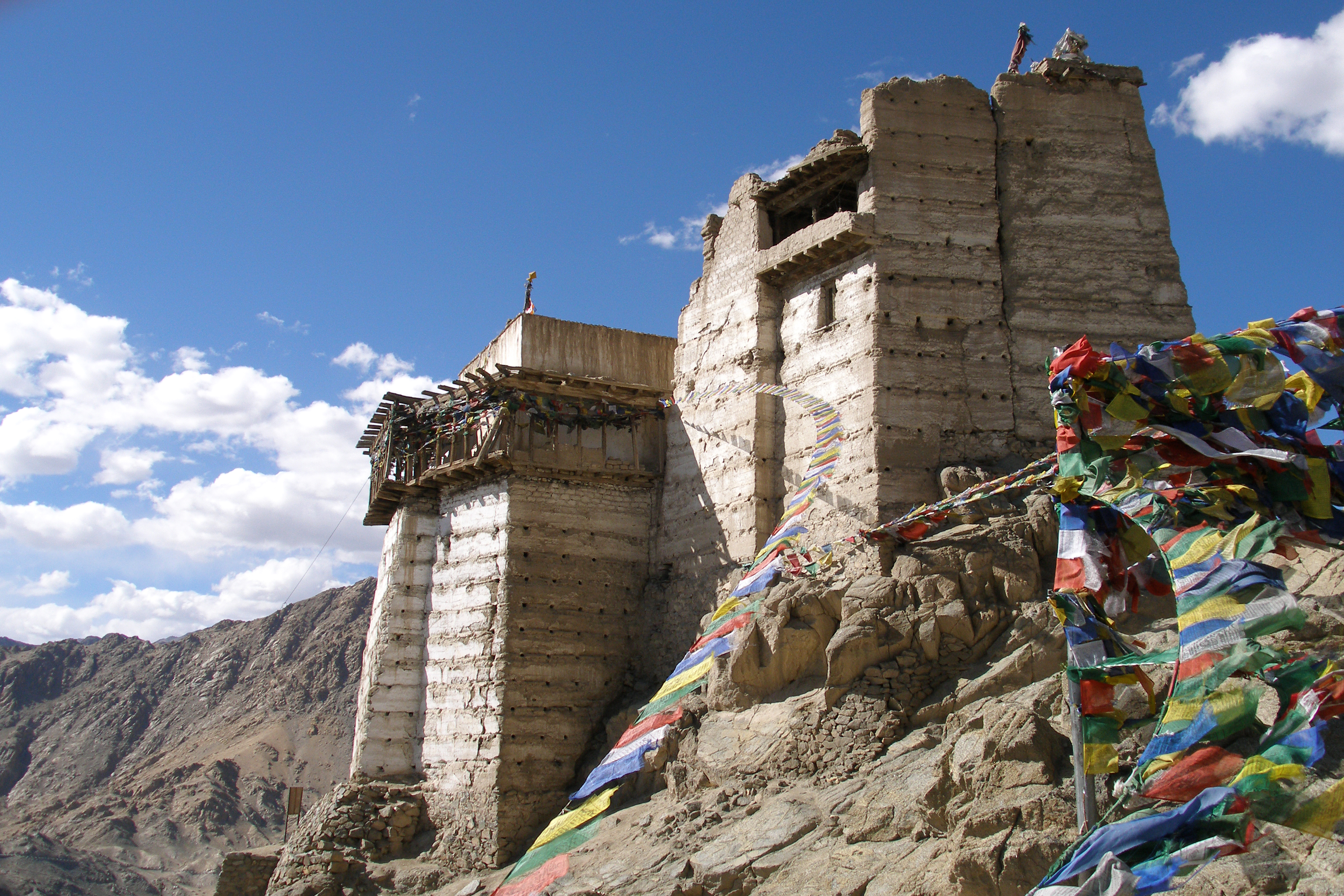
Tsemo Castle

== See also ==
- History of Ladakh
- Stok
- Zhabdrung
- Parvati Devi Deskit Wangmo – Queen mother of Ladakh and former MP

== Bibliography ==
- Petech, Luciano (1977), The Kingdom of Ladakh, c. 950–1842 A.D. (PDF), Instituto Italiano Per il Medio ed Estremo Oriente – via academia.edu
- Rizvi, Janet (1996), Ladakh: Crossroads of High Asia (Second ed.), Delhi: Oxford University Press, ISBN 0-19-564546-4
