= Tsewang Namgyal I =

Tsewang Namgyal

Gyalpo of Ladakh
- Reign: 1575–1595 CE
- Predecessor: Tashi Namgyal
- Successor: Namgyal Gonpo
- House: Namgyal dynasty of Ladakh
- Religion: Buddhism

Tsewang Namgyal (Ladakhi: ཚེ་དབང་རྣམ་རྒྱལ, Wylie: tshe-dbang rnam-rgyal) was a 16th-century Namgyal dynasty king (gyalpo) of Ladakh, India, from 1575 to 1595. Son of blind king Lhawang Namgyal. He was succeeded by his son, Namgyal Gonpo.
