= Sengge Namgyal =

Gyalpo of Ladakh from 1616 to 1642

Gyalpo of Ladakh
- Reign: 1616–1642
- Predecessor: Jamyang Namgyal
- Successor: Deldan Namgyal
- Died: 1642
- House: Namgyal
- Father: Jamyang Namgyal
- Mother: Gyal Khatun
- Religion: Buddhism

Sengge Namgyal (Ladakhi: སེང་གེ་རྣམ་རྒྱལ, Wylie: seng-ge rnam-rgyal, died 1642) was a 17th-century king of the Namgyal dynasty of Ladakh, from 1616 to his death in 1642. A Buddhist, he was noted for his immense work in building monasteries, palaces and shrines in Ladakh and is known as the "Lion King".

== Biography ==
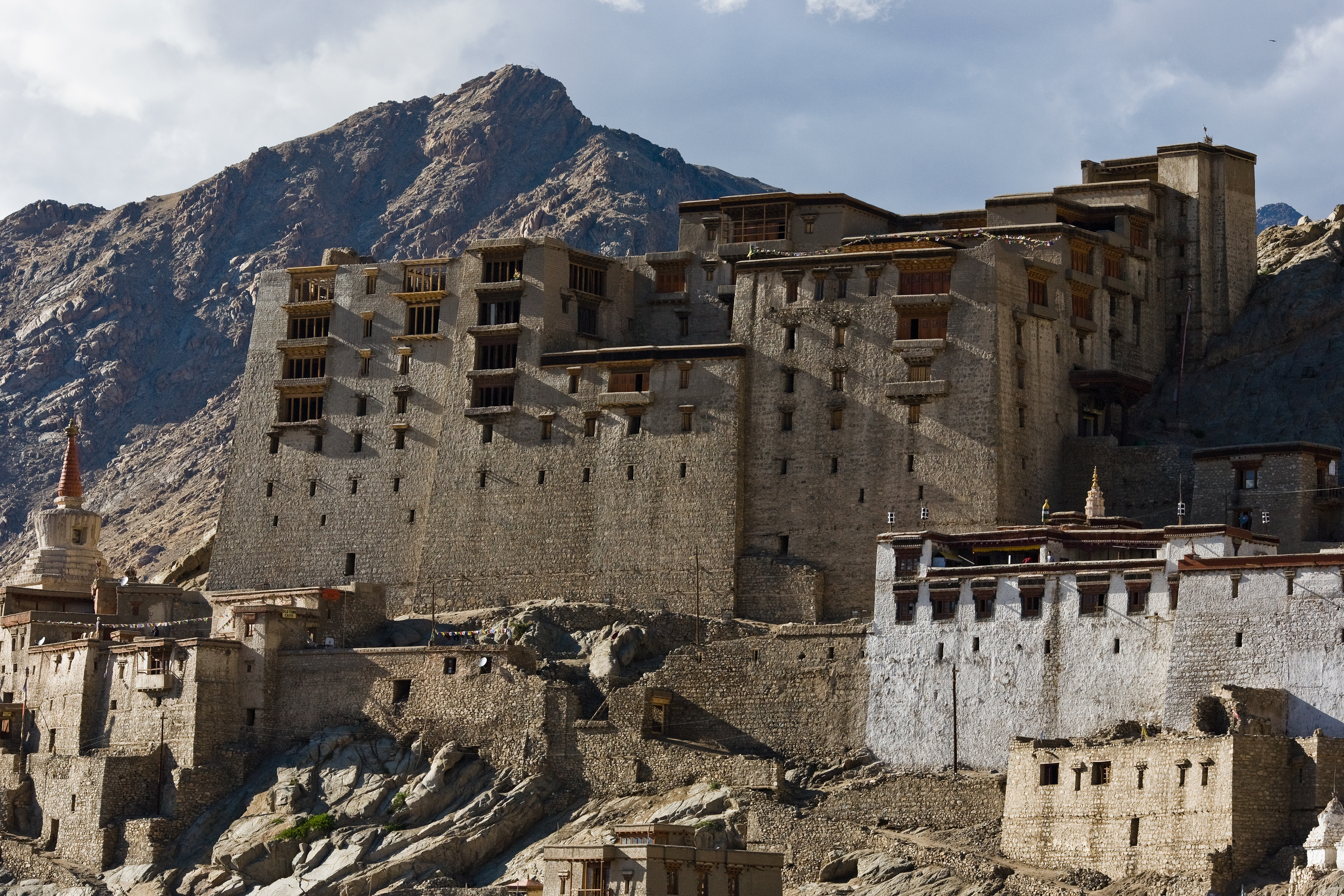
The Leh Palace, built by Sengge Namgyal

Sengge was born to Jamyang Namgyal and Gyal Khatun, a Balti princess from Skardu or Khaplu, variously described as a daughter of Yabgo Shey Ghilazi or Ali Senge, better known by his title Anchan (lit. 'The Great'). He was a devout Buddhist.

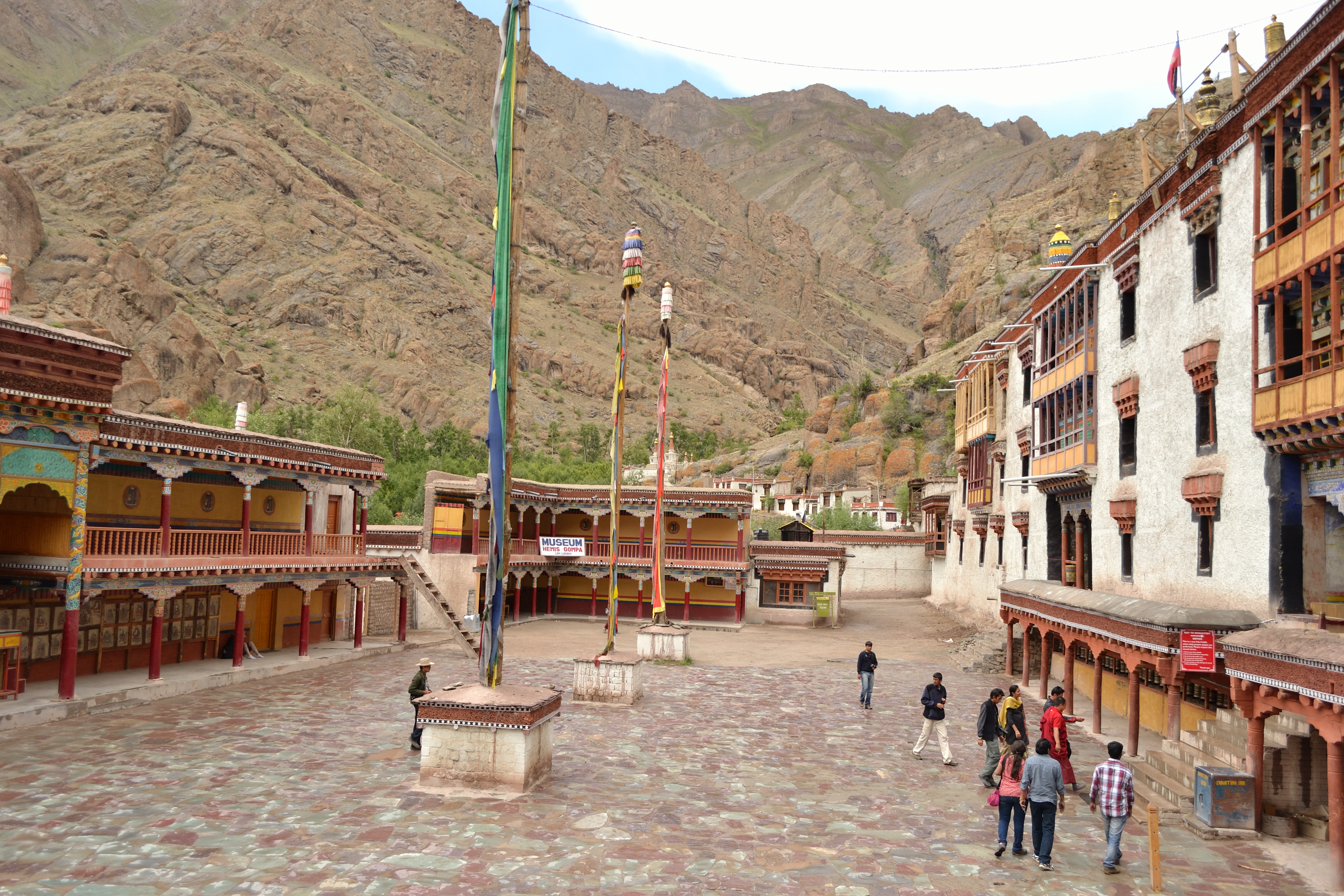
Hemis monastery courtyard

In his youth, he showed great martial skill and a flair for command. Talents which got him the command of the army. In 1614, he captured the mining town of Rudok followed by Spurangs, another important gold mining town, in 1615. The plunder and the output from these towns financed the building projects he would later commission as the King. In 1616, on the death of his father, Jamyang Namgyal, he ascended to the throne. He completed the conquests of Kingdom of Ngaris after a brief siege of Guge castle (Tsaparang) in 1619.

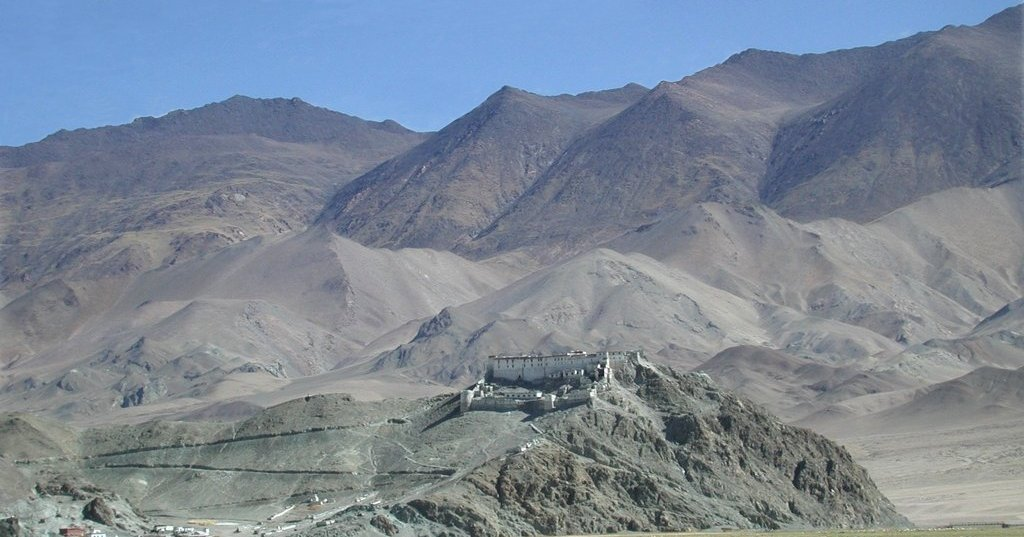
Hanle Gompa, built by Sengge and Stag-tsang-ras-pa, soon after his conversion to the Drugpa sect of Tibetan Buddhism

Sengge Namgyal Namgyal dynasty of Ladakh
Regnal titles
Preceded by Jamyang Namgyal	Ruler of Ladakh; 1616–1642	Succeeded by Deldan Namygal
