= Dadi Jawari =

17th-century female ruler of Gilgit, Pakistan

Dadi Jawari دادی جواری
- Reign: 1642—1667 and 1689—1705
- Born: Jawar Khatoon
- Known for: Daljas of Gilgit (Irrigation system in Gilgit)

Malika Jawahir Khatun locally known as Dadi Jawari was a 17-century female ruler of Gilgit, modern day Pakistan. She is remembered as the first Yashkun female ruler in the history of Gilgit and for her works of irrigation systems, including two canals for drinking water and agrarian purposes. She ruled Gilgit from 1630 till 1660.

== Biography ==
Jawahir Khatun was a daughter of Khaqan Mirza, the ruler of Gilgit. Her father had been deposed by Sangin Ali, the ruler of Chitral. Mirza went to Skardu to ask Ali Sher Khan Anchan for help. Anchan invaded with his army and defeated Sangin, who was forced to retreat. In the aftermath Jawahir Khatun was married to Ahmad Khan, the third son of Anchan, establishing a marital alliance.

After the death of Mirza Gilgit underwent a series of political upheavals, and became a battlefield among various rulers of surrounding principalities. Ultimately the Gilgit Vizier Rasho went to Gilgit and brought the princess Jawahir back, placing her on the throne. He intended to rule as regent with Jawahir as figurehead but as his intentions became obvious to the queen, she overthrew him with public support. After some time she became widowed, and agreed to marry Firdous Khan, son of Raja of Nagar. A son was born to the couple who later ruled as Raja Ji Khan after Jawahir Khatun.

== Legacy ==
"Malika Jawahir Khatun herself shouldered the responsibility of the government, put on male dress, rode on horse and issued instructions in her own name. She took great interest in ameliorating the lot of the people, undertook measures, built many roads in the country.."

— Prof. Ahmad Hasan Dani

Water channels built by Dadi Jawari consisted of two wide canals known as Ajini Daljah (upper canal) and Kherini Daljah (lower channel). The channels supplied water to agricultural lands on the outskirts what are now Barmas, Nagral, Majini Mohallah, Soni Kot and Kashrote. The channels also helped the cultivation of peripheral barren lands to form new settlements, as in earlier times the settlements were confined to Barmas, Jutial and Napoor. Dadi Juwari had to hire labor from the neighbouring Darrel valley (located in today's Diamer district) when her subjects or the citizens of the Gilgit refused to take part in the construction of the water channels.

Dadi also built roads in her dominion and undertook various welfare measures to ease the lives of her people.

== See also ==
- Mandok Gyalmo, the queen of Ali Senge Anchan
