= Palpaldo =

Village in Gilgit-Baltistan, Pakistan

Palpaldo: པལྤཨལྡོ; پلپلدو
- Village
- Location in Gilgit-Baltistan, Pakistan Palpaldo (Pakistan)
- Coordinates: 34.89207°N 76.19612°E
- Country: Pakistan
- Adm. Unit: Gilgit-Baltistan
- District: Kharmang District
- Elevation: 2,511 m (8,238 ft)
- Time zone: UTC+5:00 (PKT)

Palpaldo (Urdu: پلپلدو) is a village situated at the right bank of the indus river in Kharmang valley of Baltistan, Pakistan.
