= Kharmang Valley =

Valley in Gilgit–Baltistan, Pakistan

Kharmang Valley وادیِ کھرمنگ མཁརམང་
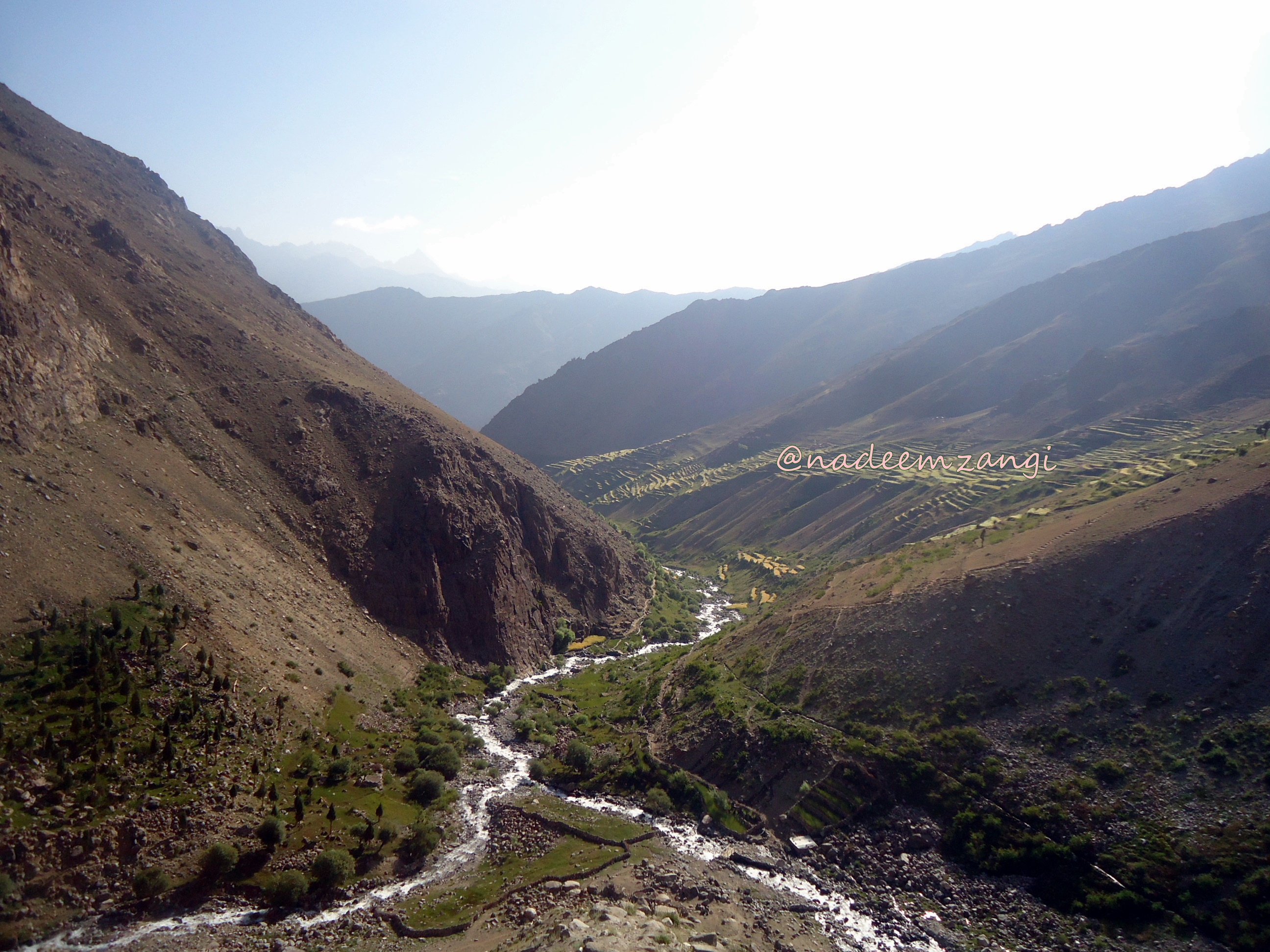
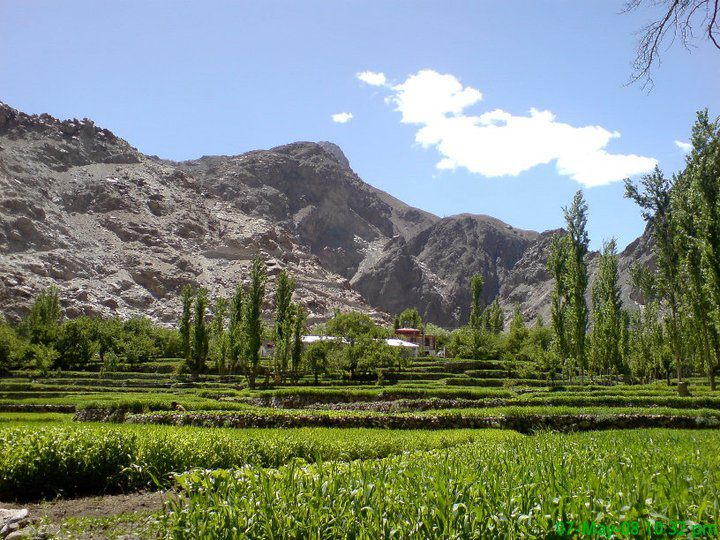
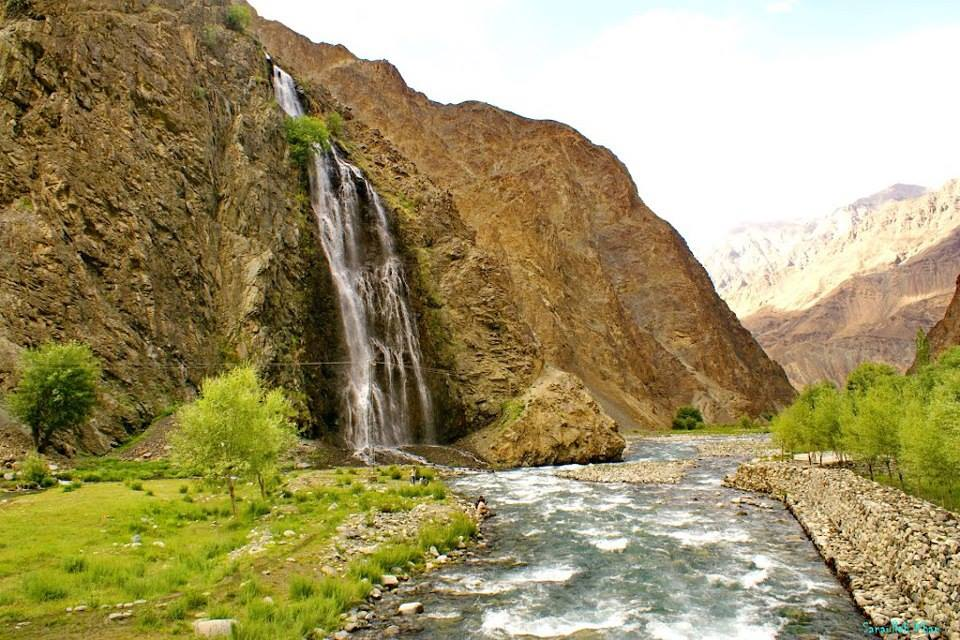
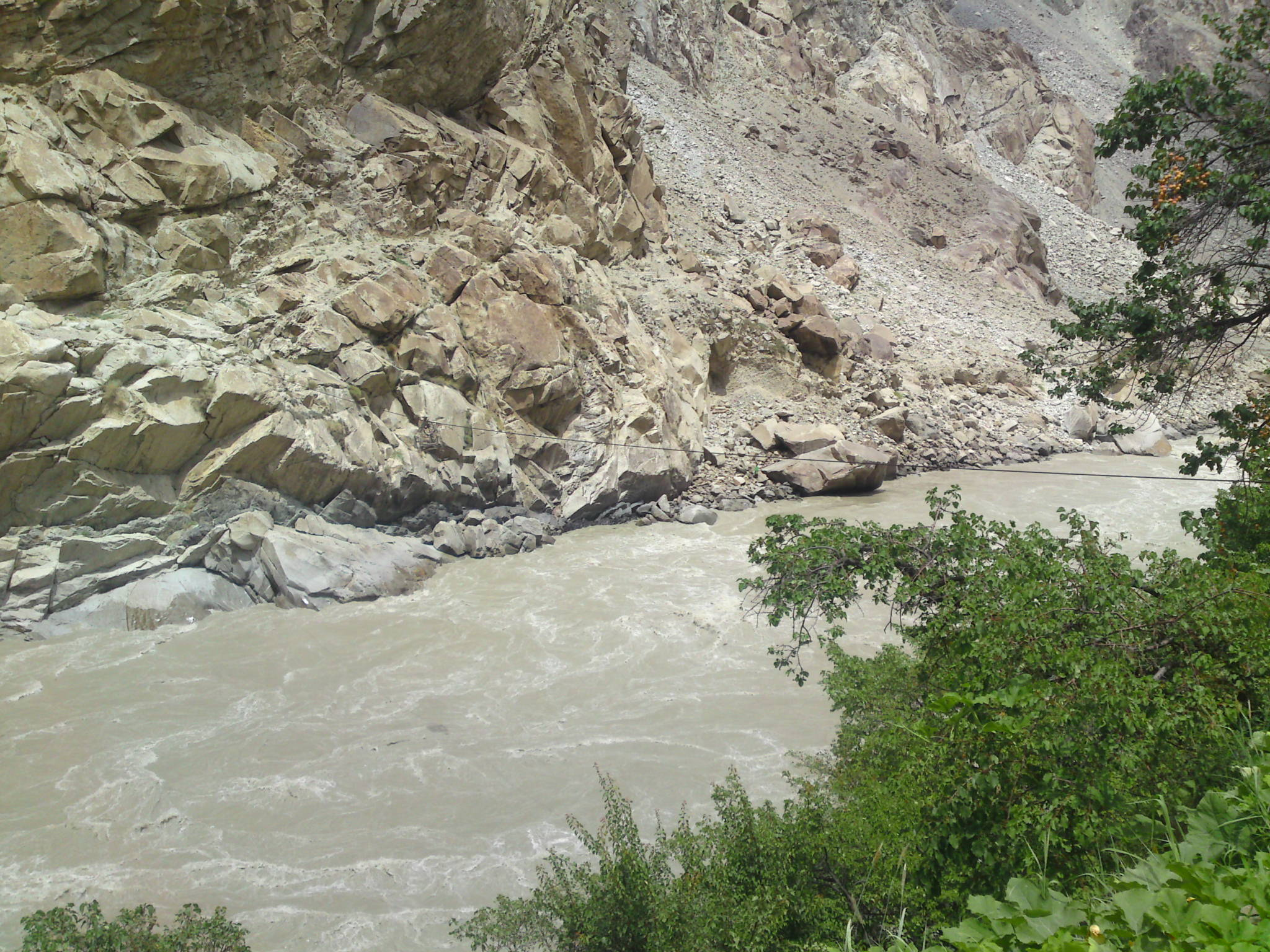

- Location within Gilgit–Baltistan Location within Pakistan
- Coordinates: 34°56′40″N 76°13′21″E
- Country: Pakistan
- Adm. Unit: Gilgit–Baltistan
- District: Kharmang District
- Time zone: UTC+5 (PKT)

The Kharmang Valley (Urdu: وادی کھرمنگ), also known as Kartaksha, is one of the five main valleys in Gilgit–Baltistan region of Pakistan. The area became a district in 2015, with its temporary headquarters at the town of Tolti. The valley is located 120 kilometres (75 mi) from the city of Skardu.

Tourist destinations in the area include Manthokha Waterfall, Khamosh Waterfall, Mehdiabad Valley, Kharmang Khas Valley, and Kharmang Fort, which is located in Kharmang Khas Valley. Kharmang is the region where the Indus River enters Pakistani-administered territory from the Leh district in the Indian-controlled territory of the disputed Kashmir region.

== Etymology ==
Kahrmang is a Balti word that consists of two parts (khar means "fort" and mang means "abundant"). The name Kharmang was given to the valley in the era of Ali Sher Khan Anchan, who built many forts in this region because of its strategic importance.

== Geography ==
According to the Gazetteer of Kashmir and Ladak (1890), Kharmang is an old ilaqa of Baltistan that consists of the right bank of the Indus from the border of Ladakh to the village of Pari, and from the source of the Shingo River to the village of Tolti on the left bank of the Indus.

== Demographics ==
Kharmang valley is a populated area. The approximate population is about 20,000 households (approximately 60,000 people); most of the population resides in scattered villages. The main source of income is subsistence livestock rearing for their livelihood and agriculture and unskilled man power working abroad and urban centers of Pakistan. Many Kharmang people work in Gulf countries with a majority in Kuwait, Bahrain and Saudi Arabia. Natives of Kharmang Valley speak Balti, Shina and predominantly follow Shia Islam, with the exception of a few people who belong to Noorbakhshi who live around Mehdi Abad.

== See also ==
- Tomskiy Khutor, Pakistan
