= Satpara Stream =

Stream in Gilgit-Baltistan, Pakistan

Coordinates: 35°17′31″N 75°37′25″E

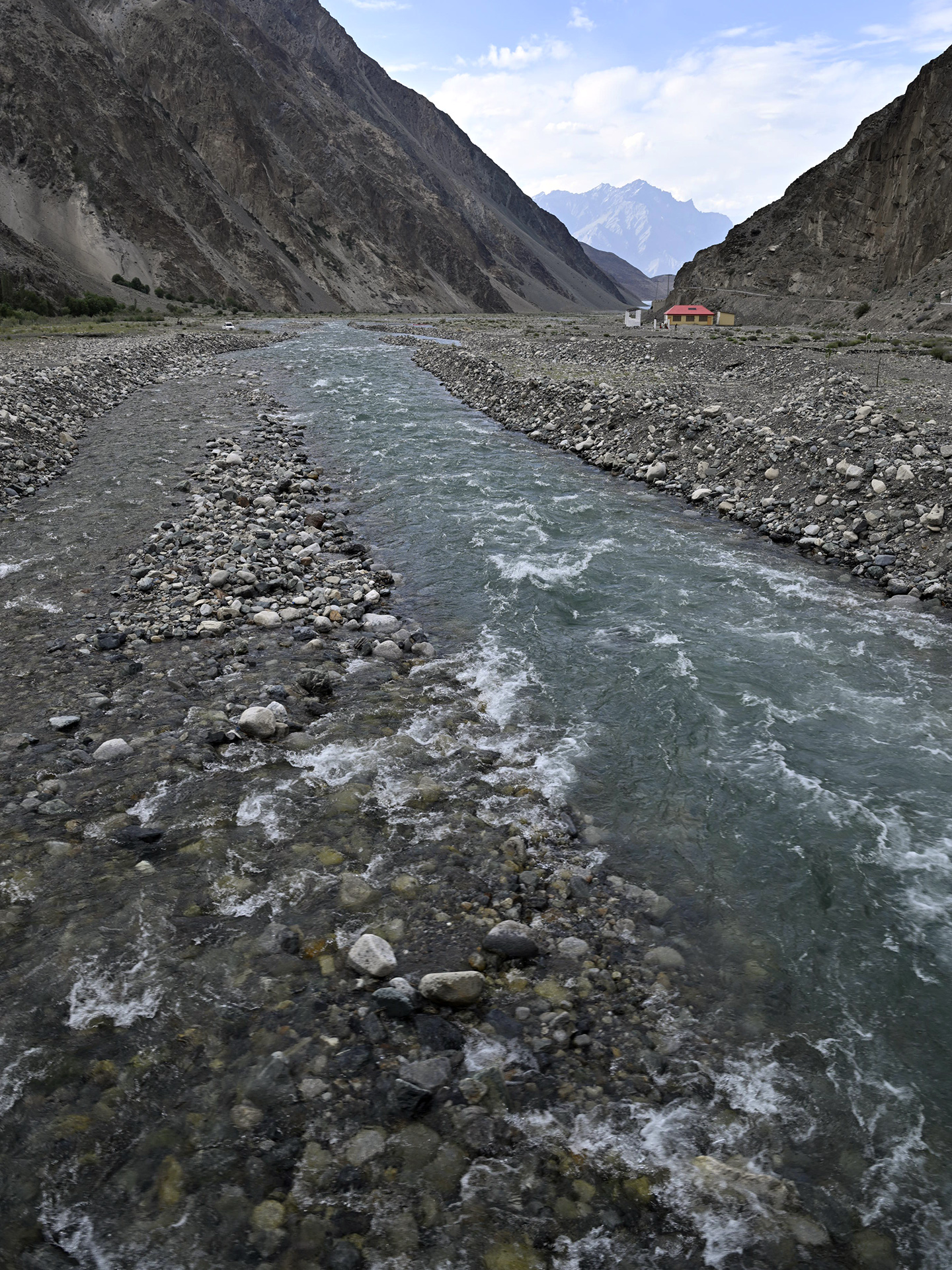
Satpara Stream near Satpara village

Sadpara Stream or Satpara Cho is a small tributary of the Indus River in Gilgit-Baltistan, Pakistan, which originates from the Satpara Lake and flows through the Skardu city. It is the only outlet of the lake. The stream was taken out of Satpara Lake by Mandok Gyalmo, the queen of the 17th century Balti king, Ali Senge Anchan, to irrigate her gardens. Satpara Dam is located downstream from Satpara Lake on the Satpara Stream approximately 4 km from the town of Skardu.
