= Skardu Fort =

Fort in Gilgit-Baltistan, Pakistan

Kharpocho Fort
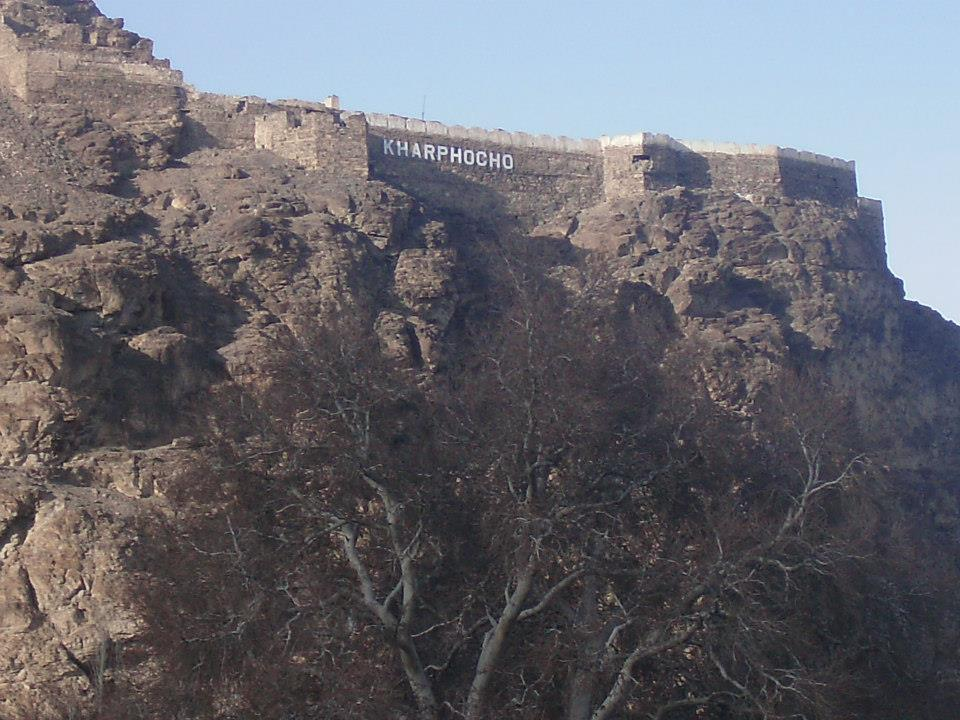
- A view of fort from the foot of Mont Kharpocho
- Interactive map of Kharpocho Fort
- Location: Skardu, Gilgit-Baltistan
- Coordinates: 35°18′15″N 75°38′22″E
- Built: 16th century CE

Skardu Fort or Kharpocho (Balti:کھرفچو; Urdu: قلعہ سکردو; lit. The king of forts) is a fort in Skardu in the Gilgit-Baltistan region of Pakistan. It mainly served as a military stronghold and strategic lookout. It is situated above the junction of Indus and Shigar rivers, overlooking the Rock of Skardu.

== History ==
The earliest structure of the fort was built by king Ali Sher Khan Anchan at the end of the 16th century. The Mendoq Khar palace of his Ladakhi queen, Mandok Gyalmo, is located just besides the fort. The fort remained centre of Maqpon dynasty till the fall of the Maqpon monarch Ahmad Shah at the hands of Dogras in 19th century.

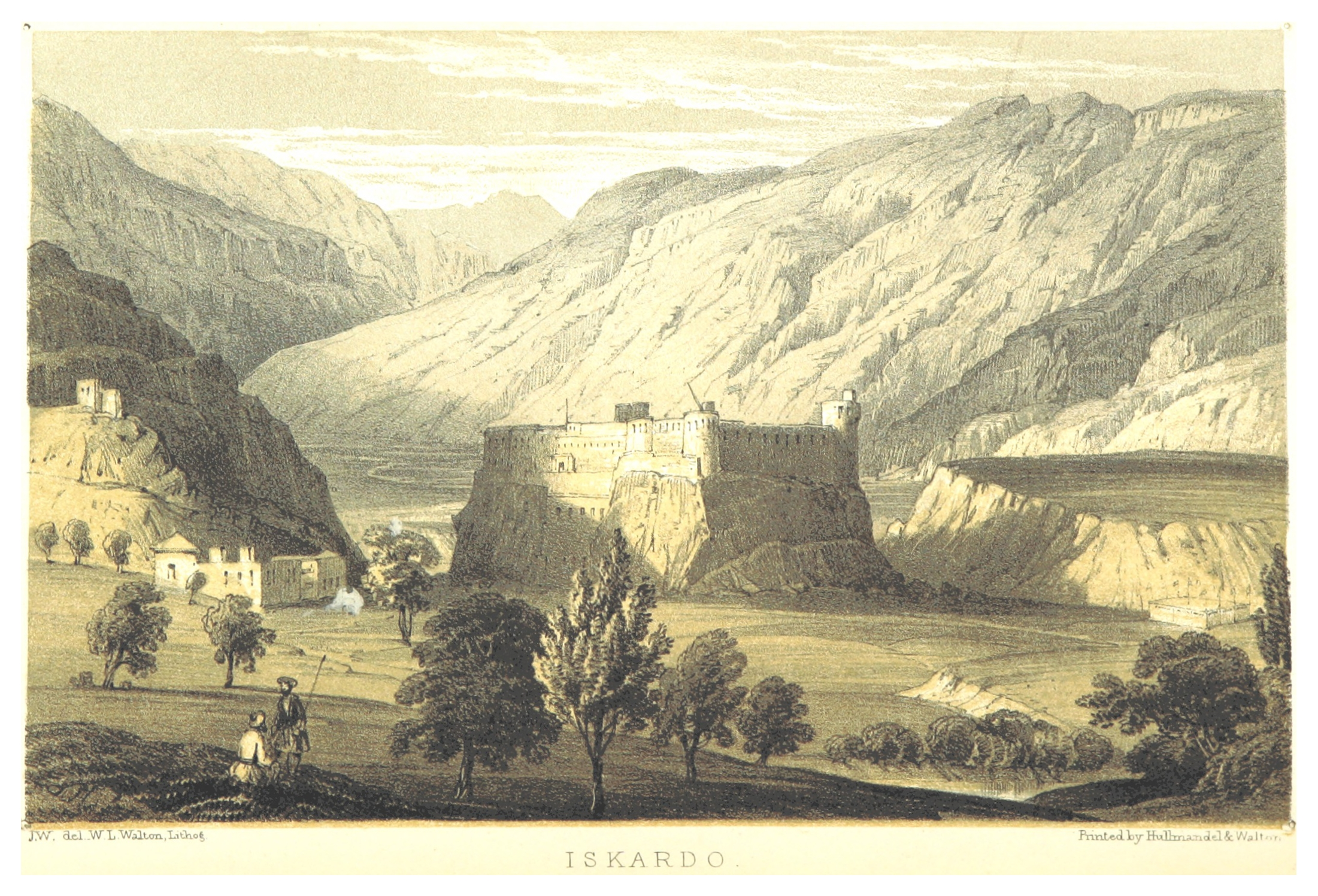
The Dogra fort in 1850

During his invasion of Baltistan in 1840, the Dogra general Zorawar Singh stormed it and razed it to the ground. Zorawar Singh had another fort built on level ground next to the Kharpocho hill.

The fort was besieged in the first Indo-Pakistan War of 1947–1948 by the Ibex Force and Chitral Scouts under Col. Mata ul-Mulk. The Jammu and Kashmir State Forces under the command of Lt. Col. Sher Jung Thapa eventually surrendered after running out of rations on 14 August 1948, a year after independence of Pakistan.

== Gallery ==
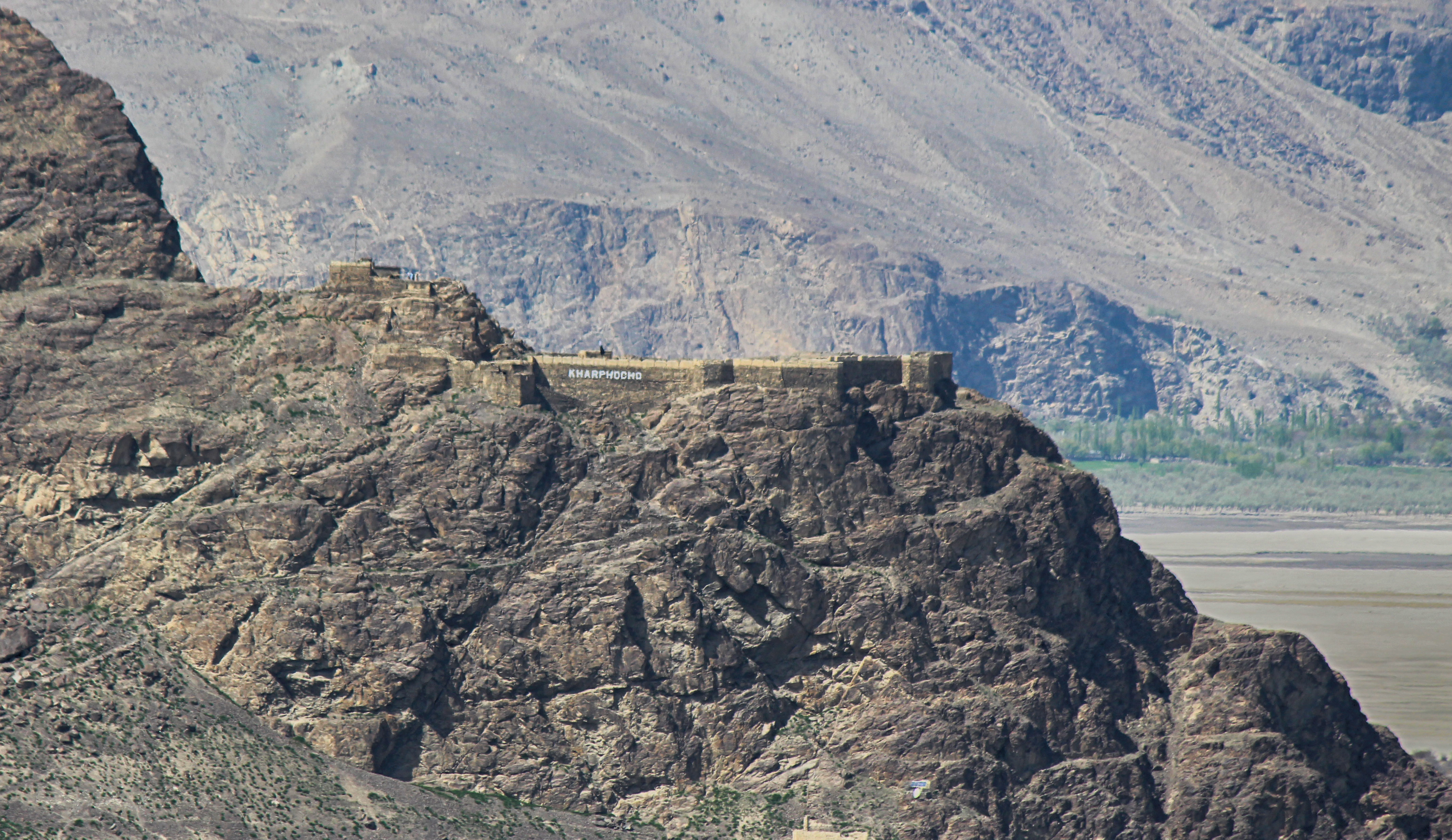
Kharpocho fort

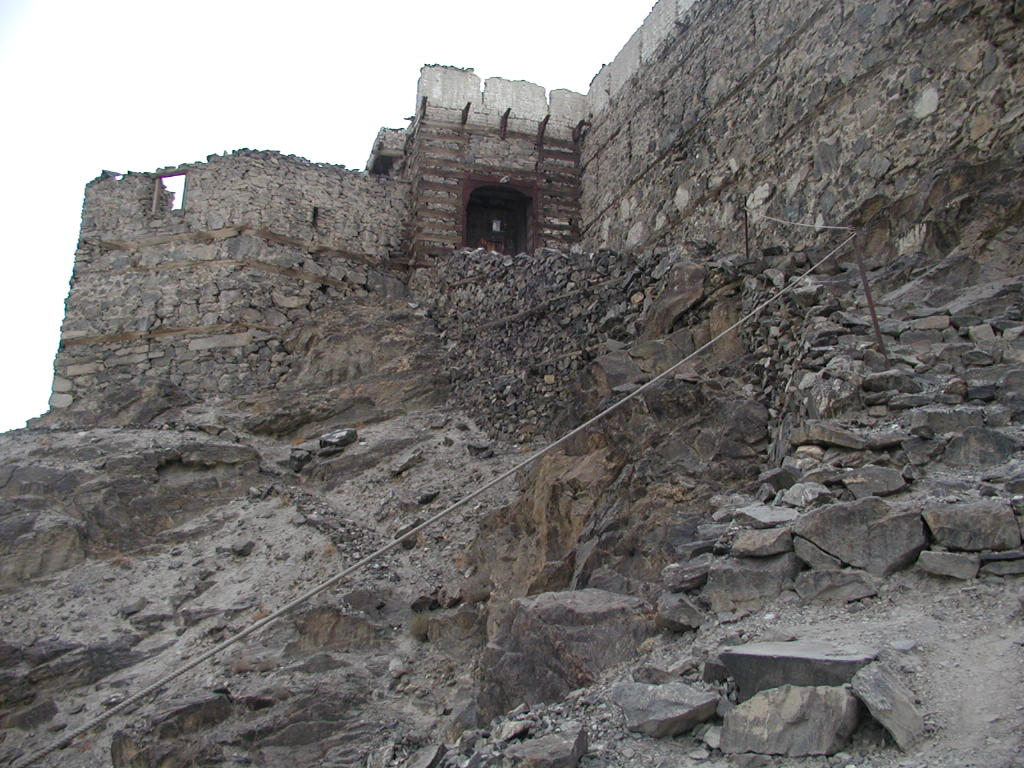
Entrance to the Skardu Fort

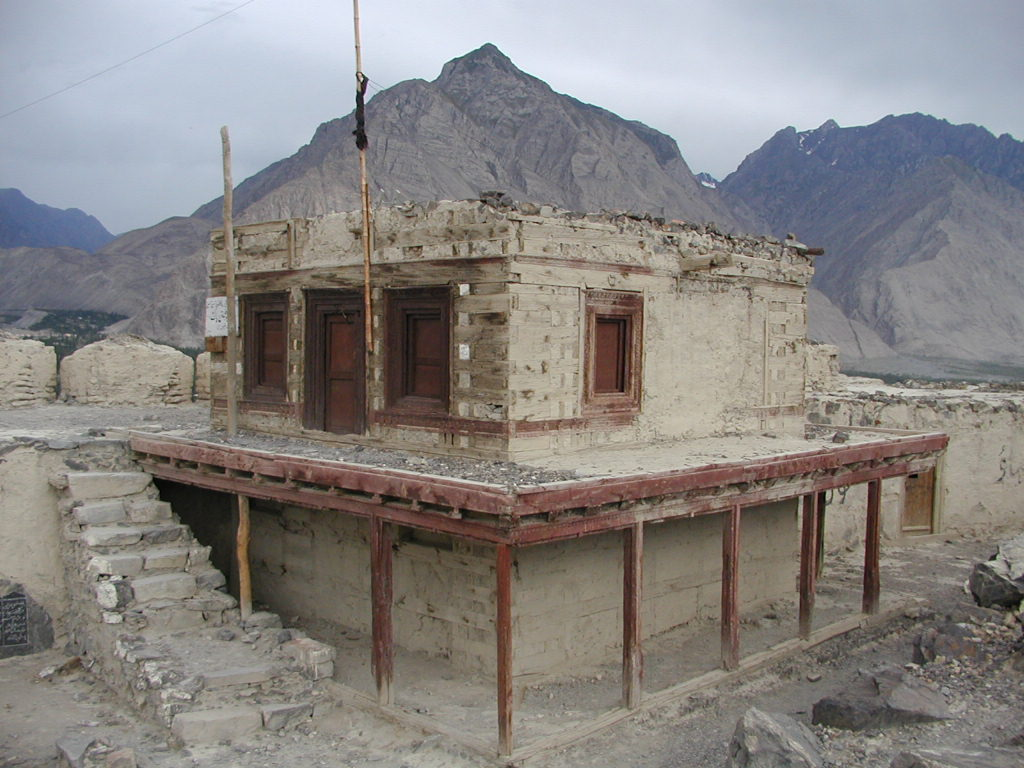
The ancient mosque at the fort

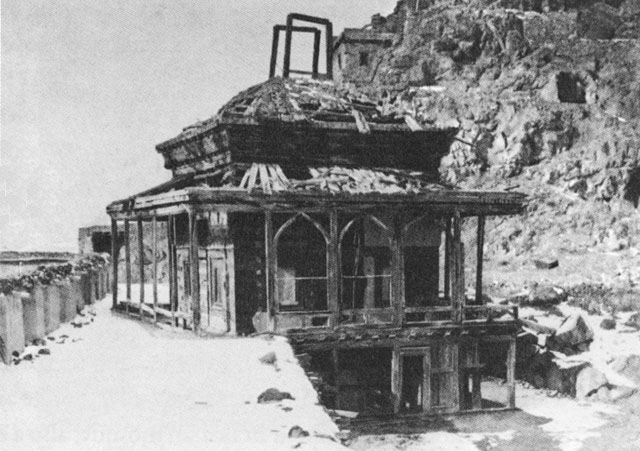
A 1924 photo of the Mosque in Skardu Fort

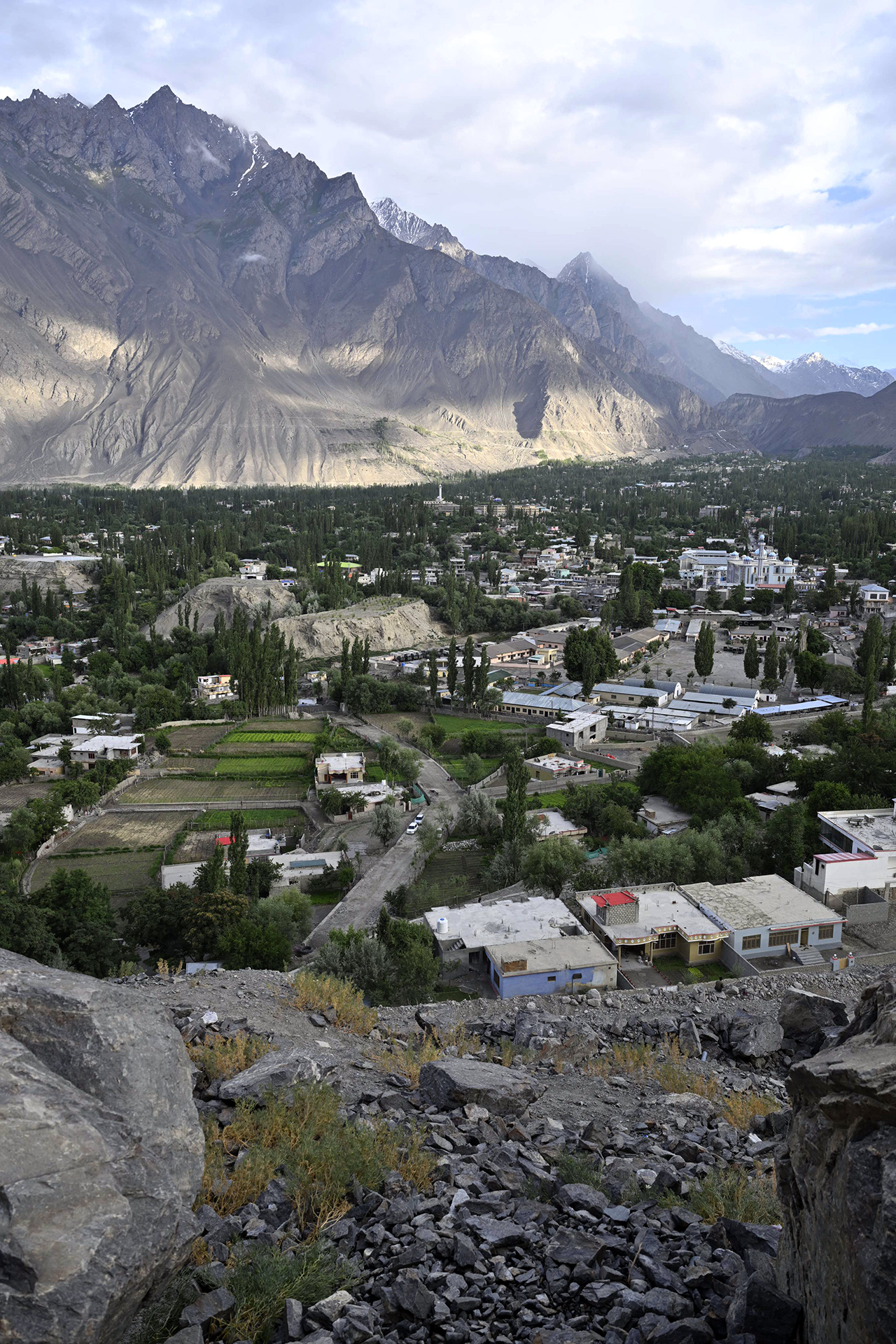
Skardu town seen from Skardu Fort

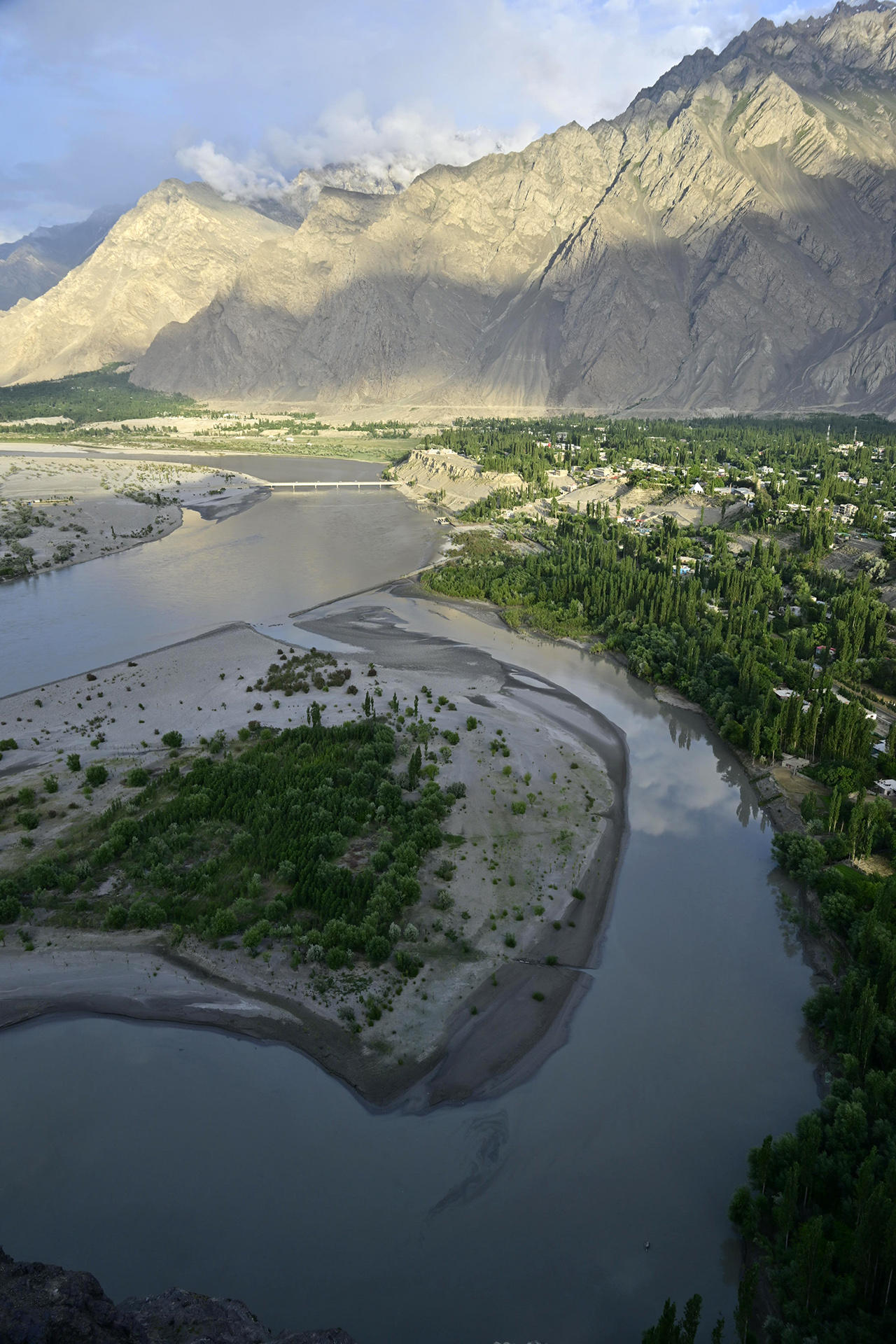
Indus River seen from Skardu Fort

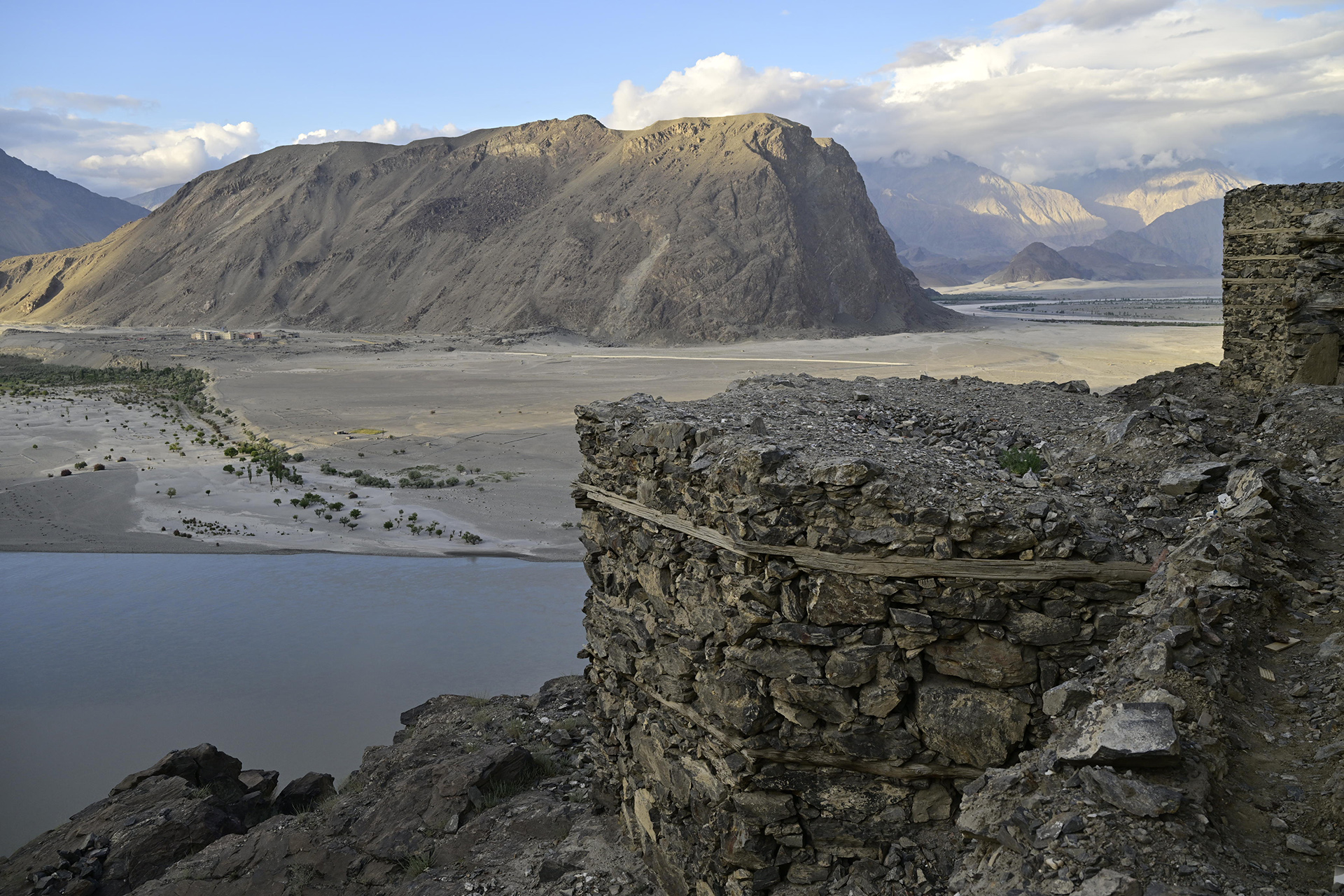
Skardu fort ruin.

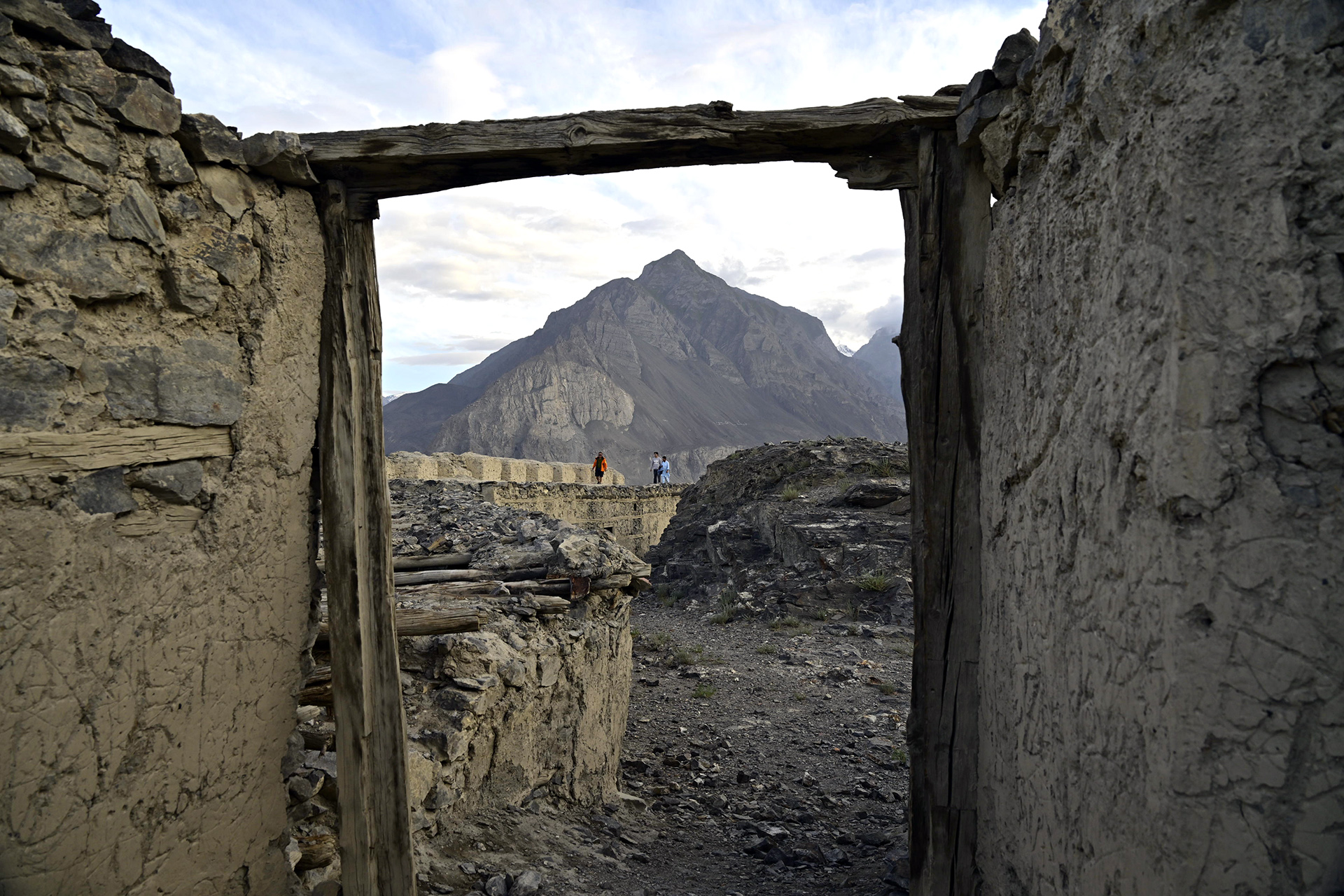
Skardu fort ruin.

== See also ==
- List of forts in Pakistan
- List of museums in Pakistan
