= Tomskiy Khutor =

- Village
- Location within Gilgit Baltistan
- Coordinates: 34.899°N 75.635°E
- Country: Pakistan
- Territories of Pakistan: Gilgit-Baltistan
- District: Kharmang
- Time zone: UTC+05:00 (PKT)

Tomskiy Khutor is a village located in the Kharmang District of Gilgit-Baltistan, Pakistan. The Pakistani Air Force has a base here.
