= Sher Jung Thapa =

Indian Army veteran (1907–1999)

Brigadier Sher Jung Thapa MVC
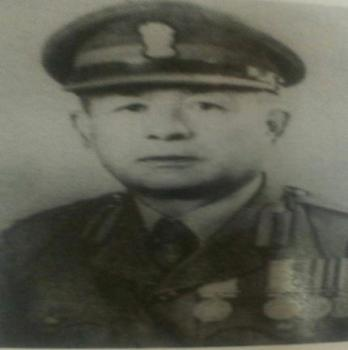
- Portrait of Sher Jung Thapa
- Born: 15 April 1907; Abbottabad, Abbottabad District, North-West Frontier Province, British Raj (present-day Khyber Pakhtunkhwa, Pakistan)
- Died: 25 February 1999 (aged 91); Delhi, India
- Military career
- Allegiance: Jammu and Kashmir (princely state); India
- Branch: Jammu and Kashmir State Forces; Indian Army
- Service years: 1930–1960
- Rank: Brigadier
- Service number: SS-15920 (short-service commission); IC-10631 (regular commission)
- Conflicts: Indo-Pakistan War of 1947
- Awards: Maha Vir Chakra

Brigadier Sher Jung Thapa MVC (15 April 1907 – 25 February 1999) was a military officer of the Jammu and Kashmir State Forces and later the Indian Army. Revered as the Hero of Skardu, he was a recipient of the Indian Army's second highest gallantry award, the Maha Vir Chakra (MVC).

== Personal life ==
Sher Jung Thapa was born in Abbottabad, Punjab, British India (now Pakistan) on 15 April 1907. His grandfather, Subedar Balkrishna Godar Thapa, part of the 5th Gorkha Rifles (Frontier Force) (5 GR(FF)), had moved from his ancestral home at Tapke Gaun, Gorkha District, Nepal to India. Sher Jung's father, Arjun Thapa (Godar), was an Honorary Captain (2/5 GR(FF)) in the British Indian Army and a World War II veteran.

During his childhood, his family moved from Abbottabad to Dharamshala where Thapa continued his education and attended college. He was known as being an excellent hockey player in college. Captain Douglas Gracey of the 1 Gorkha Regiment, who was also a hockey player, is said to have been impressed with Thapa. He was instrumental in Thapa obtaining a commissioned officer position in the Jammu and Kashmir State Forces. Jammu and Kashmir was one of the largest princely states in British India, ruled by Maharaja. Its State forces were usually headed by British officers, until September 1947.

== Indo-Pakistani War of 1947 ==
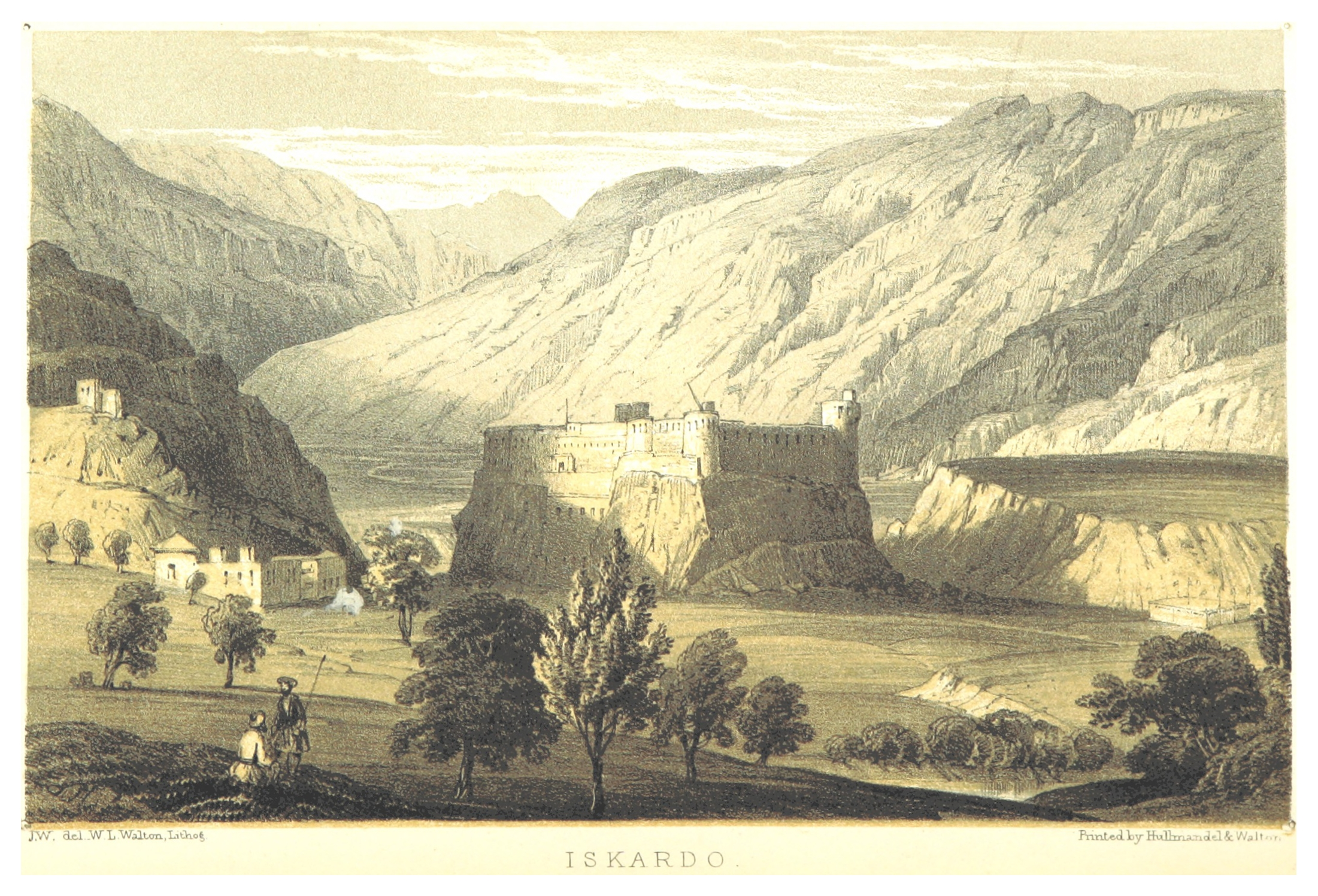
Skardu Fort (1852 image) which housed Thapa's garrison

Thapa held the rank of major in the Jammu and Kashmir State Forces at the time of the princely state's accession to India in October 1947. As part of the 6th Infantry Battalion, Thapa was stationed at Leh in Ladakh. His commanding officer, Col. Abdul Majid was based at Bunji in the Astore wazarat, bordering the Gilgit Agency, which had been returned to the princely state by the departing British administration. On 30 October, Col. Majid went to Gilgit along with forces to support Governor Ghansara Singh, who was apprehensive of the loyalty of the British-officered Gilgit Scouts based there. The Muslim officers of the regiment mutinied under the leadership of Captain Mirza Hassan Khan and joined the Gilgit Scouts. Governor Ghansara Singh was arrested and Col. Majid was also taken prisoner. The Hindu and Sikh members of the forces were massacred. What was left of the State Forces escaped to Skardu in the Ladakh wazarat.

Skardu was the tehsil headquarters of Baltistan, which also doubled as the district headquarters of the Ladakh wazarat for six months in a year. It was a key post between Gilgit and Leh and the Indian Army considered it essential to hold the Skardu garrison for the defence of Leh. (Note: After the accession of Jammu and Kashmir, the State Forces came under the command of the Indian Army.)

Major Thapa was promoted to lieutenant colonel and asked to take charge of the remaining 6th Infantry at Skardu. He left Leh on 23 November and reached Skardu by 2 December, walking through heavy snow fall. This gave him enough time to make preparations for the defence of Skardu before the impending attack. Meanwhile, the Pakistani commander at Gilgit reorganised the Gilgit Scouts and the 6th Infantry rebels into three forces of 400 men each. The "Ibex Force", one among the three, commanded by Major Ehsan Ali, was tasked with capturing Skardu. Thapa deployed two forward posts near the Tsari pass thirty miles away. However, Captain Nek Alam, commanding one of the platoons, joined the rebels, and the other platoon got massacred. On 11 February 1948, the attack commenced on Skardu. For over six months from February to August, Thapa withstood the attack, housed in the garrison with dwindling ammunition and food. Reinforcements by ground were ambushed en route and reinforcements by air were considered infeasible due to the high mountains and uncertain weather conditions. Attempts were made to air drop supplies, but the drops often landed outside the garrison. Eventually, on 14 August, Thapa succumbed to the invaders, having exhausted all supplies. He was taken prisoner and repatriated after the war ended. All the other men in the garrison were apparently killed. Thapa is believed to have been spared due to his earlier association with Douglas Gracey, who was then the Chief of the Pakistan Army.

Thapa was awarded the Maha Vir Chakra, the second highest gallantry award of India. He was commissioned into the Indian Army in 1957 and eventually rose to become a brigadier. He retired from the Army on 18 June 1960.

== Military decorations ==
Mahavir Chakra (1948), General Service Medal, 1947 Class J&K, Indian Independence Medal, War Medal, India Service Medal, Military Service Medal.

== Death ==
Thapa died at Army Hospital, Delhi on 25 February 1999.

== Dates of rank ==
Insignia	Rank	Component	Date of rank
	Second Lieutenant	Jammu & Kashmir State Forces	1 January 1937
	Lieutenant	Jammu & Kashmir State Forces	1 January 1939
	Captain	Jammu & Kashmir State Forces	1 July 1946
	Second Lieutenant	Indian Army	1 November 1947 (short-service commission) (Note: Upon independence in 1947, India became a Dominion within the British Commonwealth of Nations. As a result, the rank insignia of the British Army, incorporating the Tudor Crown and four-pointed Bath Star ("pip"), was retained, as George VI remained Commander-in-Chief of the Indian Armed Forces. After 26 January 1950, when India became a republic, the President of India became Commander-in-Chief, and the Ashoka Lion replaced the crown, with a five-pointed star being substituted for the "pip.")
	Major	Jammu & Kashmir State Forces	1 January 1950
	Major	Jammu & Kashmir State Forces	26 January 1950
	Lieutenant-Colonel	Indian Army	1 January 1957 (seniority from 1 January 1953)
	Colonel	Indian Army	
	Brigadier	Indian Army	1 October 1954 (acting); 1 January 1960 (substantive)

== Bibliography ==
- Bangash, Yaqoob Khan (2010), "Three Forgotten Accessions: Gilgit, Hunza and Nagar", The Journal of Imperial and Commonwealth History, 38 (1): 117–143, doi:10.1080/03086530903538269, S2CID 159652497
- Chakravorty, B. (1995), "IC-10631 – Lt Col Thapa, Sher Jung, MVC", Stories of Heroism: PVC & MVC Winners, Allied Publishers, pp. 351–, ISBN 978-81-7023-516-3
- Cheema, Brig Amar (2015), The Crimson Chinar: The Kashmir Conflict: A Politico Military Perspective, Lancer Publishers, pp. 51–, ISBN 978-81-7062-301-4
- Francis, Col. J. (2013), "Thapa the Tenacious", Short Stories from the History of the Indian Army Since August 1947, Vij Books India Pvt Ltd, pp. 25–, ISBN 978-93-82652-17-5
- Subramaniam, Arjun (2016), India's Wars: A Military History, 1947–1971, HarperCollins India, ISBN 978-9351777496

== See also ==
- Magar people
