= Ali Sher Khan Anchan =

Balti king (1580–1633)

Ali Sher Khan
- Anchan

Gyalfo of Baltiyul
- Reign: 1595 – 1633
- Predecessor: Ghazi Mir
- Successor: Abdal Khan
- Born: Ali Sher; 1580; Skardu
- Died: 1633 (aged 52–53); Skardu
- Spouses: Mandok Gyalmo
- Issue: Abdal Khan; Gyal Khatun (possibly); Adam Khan; Ahmad Khan
- House: Maqpon
- Father: Ghazi Mir
- Religion: Islam

Ali Sher Khan (Balti: علی شیر خان اَنچن, Tibetan script: ཨལི་ཤེར་ཁན་ཨནཆན་།; 1580–1633), also known as Ali Senge Anchan, was the Maqpon king (Gyalfo) of Baltistan from 1595 to 1633. Considered greatest of the Balti rulers, Anchan expanded the frontiers of Balti kingdom from Ladakh and western Tibet in the east to Haramosh in Brushal in the west.

In his numerous campaigns Anchan conquered Ladakh, Purig, Gilgit, Brushal (Hunza-Nagir) and Chilas, reaching as far as Chitral. His name is recorded as Ali Mir in Ladakh Chronicles and Ali Rai by the Mughal court historians.

== Background ==
Ali Sher Khan Anchan was born to Ghazi Mir (reigned 1565–1595), the Maqpon (Wylie: dmag dpon, lit. 'army leader') ruler of Skardu, in 1580. The Maqpon power was consolidated by Makpon Bokha in about 1500. His successors gradually brought extended their domains towards Astore and Shigar.

Ghazi Mir continued the policy of expansion. He annexed Roundu and then sent Anchan to conquer the Kartaksha Valley from the Namgyal rulers of Ladakh, who did so by expelling the Ladakhi troops stationed there. After the Mughal conquest of Kashmir in 1586, diplomatic relations developed between the Mughals and Ghazi Mir.

== Reign ==
Ali Sher Anchan succeeded his father in 1595.

=== Invasion of Ladakh ===
The Ladakh kingdom once extended to Sermik in the west. During the reign of Ghazi Mir, the Ladakhis were driven out, not only from the Kartaksha Valley but from the entire district of Purig (Kargil) by Anchan who garrisoned the fort at Kharbu with soldiers and appointed a Kharpon or governor to administer the border area.

A few years later the Gyalpo of Ladakh, Jamyang Namgyal, attacked Purig, killing the Skardu garrison at Kharbu as well as a number of Muslims. Anchan left with a strong army by way of Marol, bypassed the Ladakhi army and occupied Leh, the capital of Ladakh. Namgyal was taken prisoner.

After Namgyal sued for peace, Anchan signed a peace treaty with him. Accordingly, the villages of Ganokh and Gagra Nullah (Grugurdo) were ceded to Skardu and the Ladakhi king agreed to pay annual tribute. This tribute was paid through the Gonpa (monastery) of Lama Yuru until 19th century. In this way the region of Purig was annexed into Baltistan. A marital alliance was established between Skardu and Ladakh; a Balti princess, Gyal Khatun, was married to Jamyang on condition that her son would succeed him (later to be known as Sengge Namgyal), while Anchan married Jamyang's daughter, Mandok Gyalmo. The battle occurred around 1594 CE.

=== Conquest of Astore and Chilas ===
The plundering raids on villages in Roundu, Dras, Gultari and Shigar by the people from Gilgit, Chilas and Astore, while he was preoccupied with the campaigns in Ladakh, forced Anchan to march to Astore and Chilas and annex them. Anchan's grandson, Shah Sultan was appointed governor of Astore.

=== Invasion of Gilgit ===
Around this period, the Gilgit ruler Sultan Mirza was defeated by Chitral ruler Sangin Ali, who occupied Gilgit. Sultan Mirza was forced to take refuge in Skardu and ask Anchan for help. Anchan defeated Chitralis and restored Sultan Mirza to throne. He also gained territory up to Haramosh Valley and a daughter of Gilgit ruler, Jawahar Khatun, was married to Anchan's son Ahmad Khan.

To commemorate his victory Anchan planted a Chinar Tree (Plane Tree) at Brushal. In the folklore about this Chinar of Brushal, the exploits of Ali Sher Anchan are enumerated and tribute is paid to the Anchan for his remarkable conquests. A popular Balti saying defines the western and eastern boundaries of the kingdom under Ali Sher Anchan as "Leh Purang na Brushal Shingel", literally "from Leh’s Purang to Brushal’s Chinar Tree".

=== Mughal Invasion ===
The Mughal court historians, Abdul Hamid Lahori and Muhammad Saleh Kamboh, record an invasion of Baltistan by the subahdar of Kashmir during the reign of Jahangir (r. 1605–1627), which met a defeat on the hand of Anchan.

=== Legacy ===
As the population of Skardu grew, it faced scarcity of drinkable water during winter and flooding during summer. For this Anchan dammed the Satpara Lake, which before had been seasonal stream. A stream, known as Satpara Stream, was taken out of it by his queen Mandok Gyalmo to irrigate her gardens as well as to supply water to the town. Anchan built a number of forts in Kartaksha, leading it to be known as Kharmang or land of many forts. He also built the Kharpocho Fort in Skardu. He is accredited with introducing Polo in Baltistan, including at Shandur Polo Ground, for the first time.

Anchan brought a number of war prisoners from Chilas, Brushal, Astore and Gilgit and got them settled in Kargil and Baltistan; their descendants still inhabit these areas and are known as Brokpas.

== Death and succession ==
Ali Sher Anchan died in 1633, and was succeeded by Adam Khan. Anchan had appointed his other two sons, Abdal Khan and Ahmad Khan, as rulers of Kharmang and Roundu valleys, respectively. Soon fighting ensued between the three and Abdal Khan, being the strongest, expelled Adam from Skardu in 1633 who went to Delhi to ask Shah Jahan for help. Shah Jahan dispatched an army from Kashmir which invaded and occupied Skardu in 1634. Adam Khan was reinstalled as a vassal.

All later rulers of Astore, Skardu, Roundu, and Kharmang prior to the Dogra conquest descended from Anchan.

== Sources ==
- Dani, Ahmad Hasan (1991) [1989]. History of Northern Areas of Pakistan (2nd ed.). Islamabad: National Institute of Historical and Cultural Research, Quaid-i-Azam University. ISBN 978-969-415-016-1.
- Petech, Luciano (1977). The Kingdom of Ladakh, c. 950–1842 A.D. (PDF). Instituto Italiano Per il Medio ed Estremo Oriente – via academia.edu.
- Halkias, Georgios T. (2015). "The Muslim Queens of the Himalayas: Princess Exchanges in Baltistan and Ladakh" (PDF). Islam and Tibet – Interaction Along the Musk Routes. Oxford Centre of Buddhist Studies.
- Dani, Ahmad Hasan (2003). "The Pamirs, Badakhshan and the Trans-Pamir States (Part 2: The Trans-Pamir States)". History of Civilizations of Central Asia, Volume V. Paris: UNESCO Publishing. pp. 235–46. ISBN 92-3-103876-1.
- Afridi, Banat Gul (1988). Baltistan in History. Peshawar: Emjay Books International. OCLC 21303940.
