= Satpara Lake =

Lake in Pakistan

- سدپارہ جھیل (Urdu)
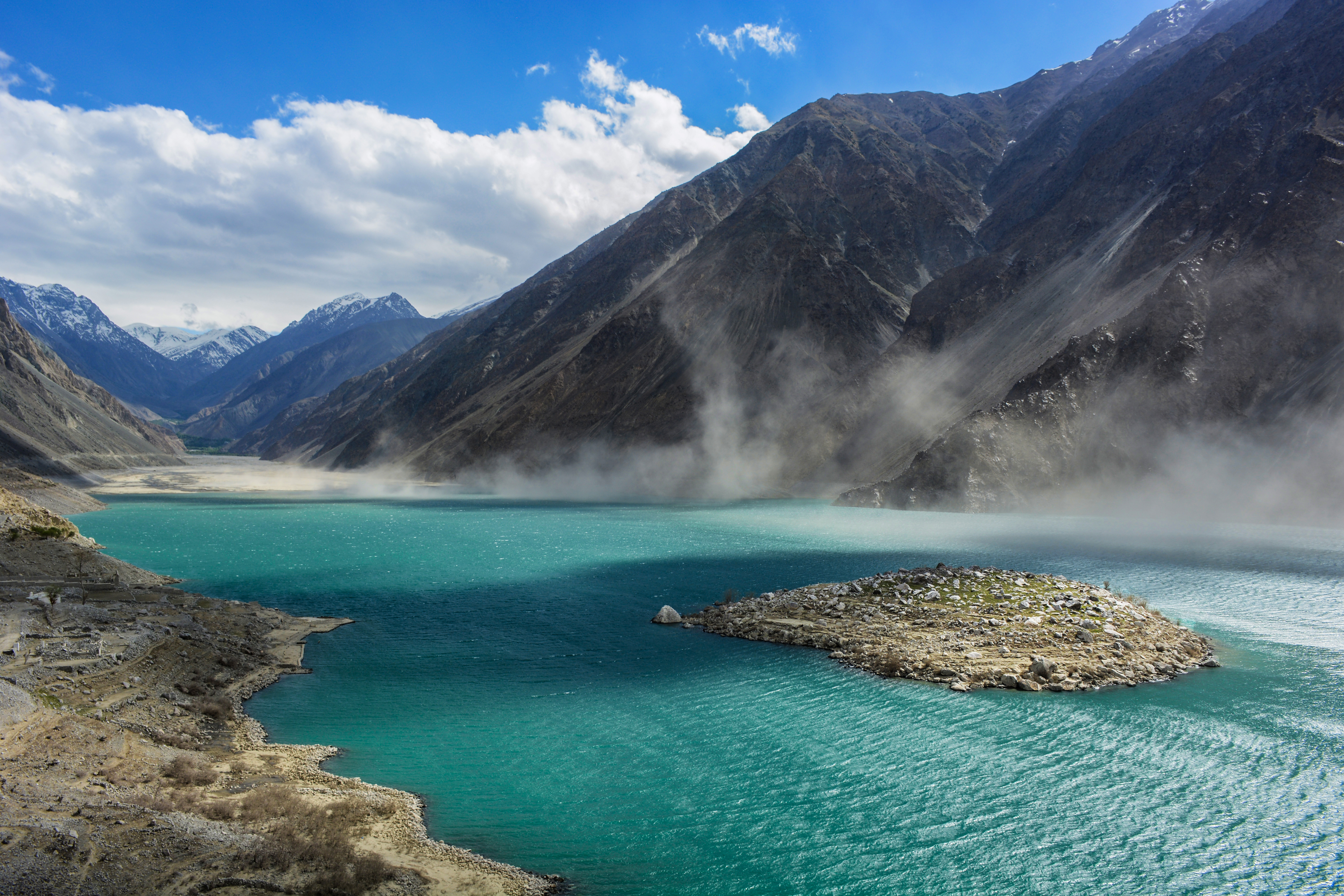
- The lake is set among the region’s spectacular mountainous landscapes

- Location within Gilgit Baltistan
- Location: near Sadpara village, Skardu Valley, Gilgit-Baltistan
- Coordinates: 35.229521°N 75.630398°E
- Etymology: Sadpara (lit. 'Seven gates')
- Primary outflows: Satpara Stream
- Basin countries: Pakistan
- Max. length: 3.5 kilometres (2.2 mi)
- Max. width: 1.4 kilometres (0.87 mi)
- Surface area: 4 square kilometres (1.5 sq mi)
- Surface elevation: 2,600 metres (8,500 ft)
- Islands: Yes
- Settlements: Skardu
- Website: http://www.skardu.pk

Satpara Lake, also spelled Sadpara (Urdu: سدپارہ جھیل) is a natural lake near Skardu in the Gilgit-Baltistan region of Pakistan. The lake supplies water to Skardu Valley through the Satpara Stream. It is fed by the melting glacial ice from the surrounding mountains, while the Satpara Stream is the lake's only outlet, which drains into the Indus River. Satpara Lake is situated at an elevation of 2,600 m (8,500 ft) above sea level and spans an area of 4 km^{2} (1.5 sq mi). It provides habitat to the brown and rainbow trout fishes which were introduced in the region.

== History ==
Traditional accounts attribute the damming of the Satpara Lake to the Balti king Ali Senge Anchan (1595–1633), while the stream was taken out of it by his queen Mandok Gyalmo to irrigate her gardens. The completion of Satpara Dam downstream of the lake has enlarged the size of Satpara Lake.

== Physical features ==
The melting snow from the Deosai Plains is the main source of water for the lake. At a height of 2,600 m (8,500 ft), the lake is centered with an area of 4 km with a picturesque island.

== Gallery ==
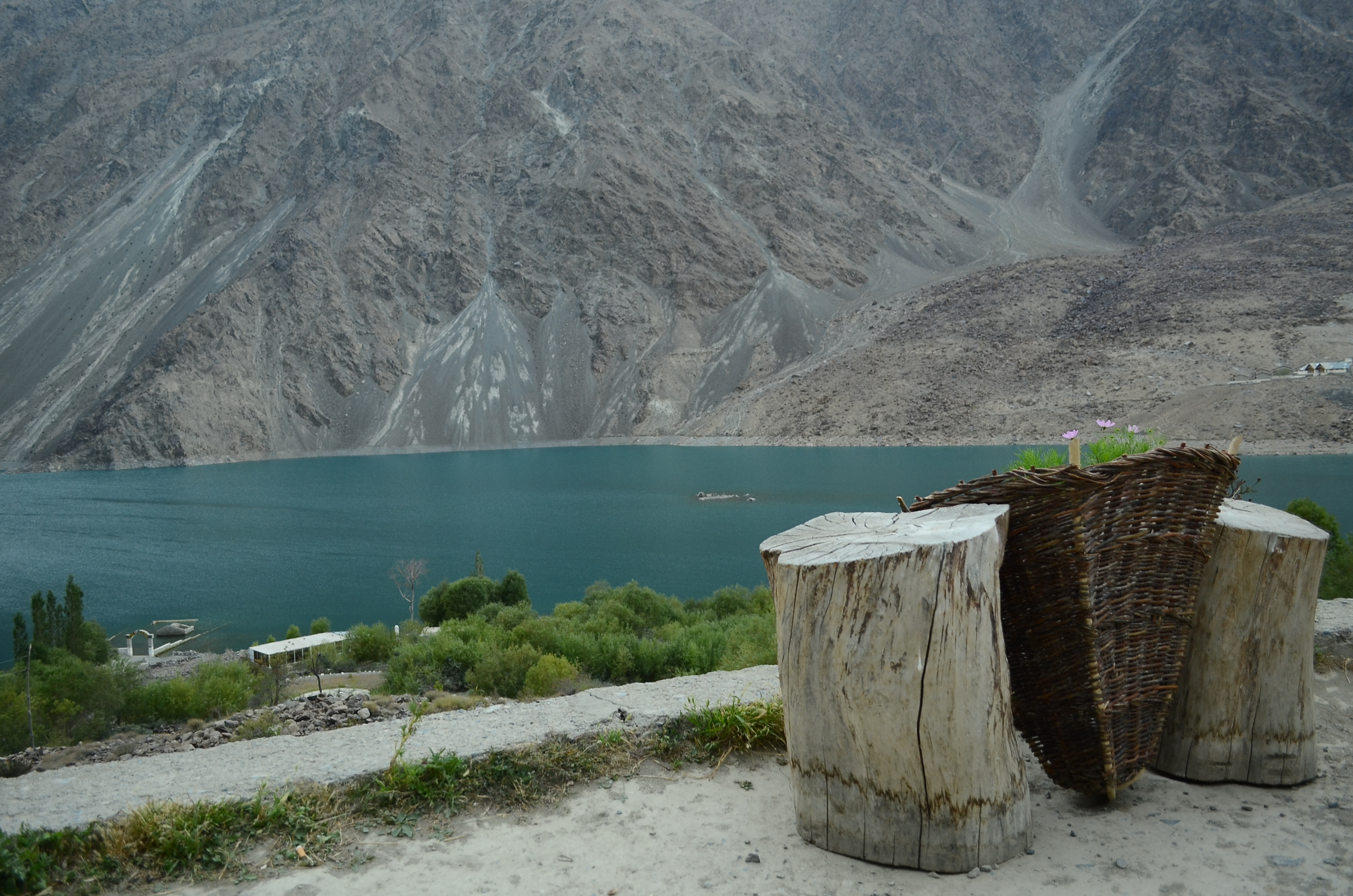
Sadpara Lake

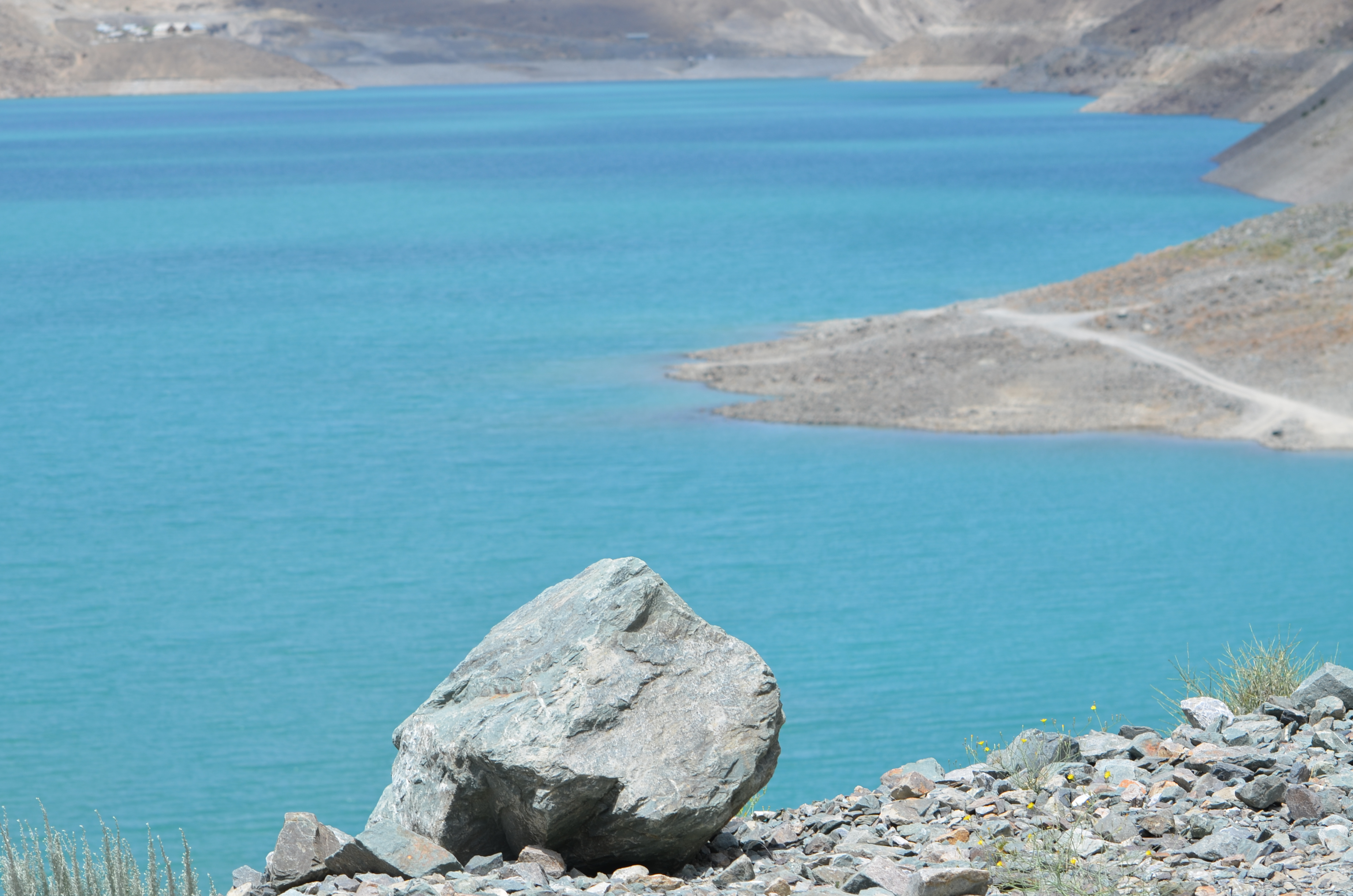
Sadpara Lake

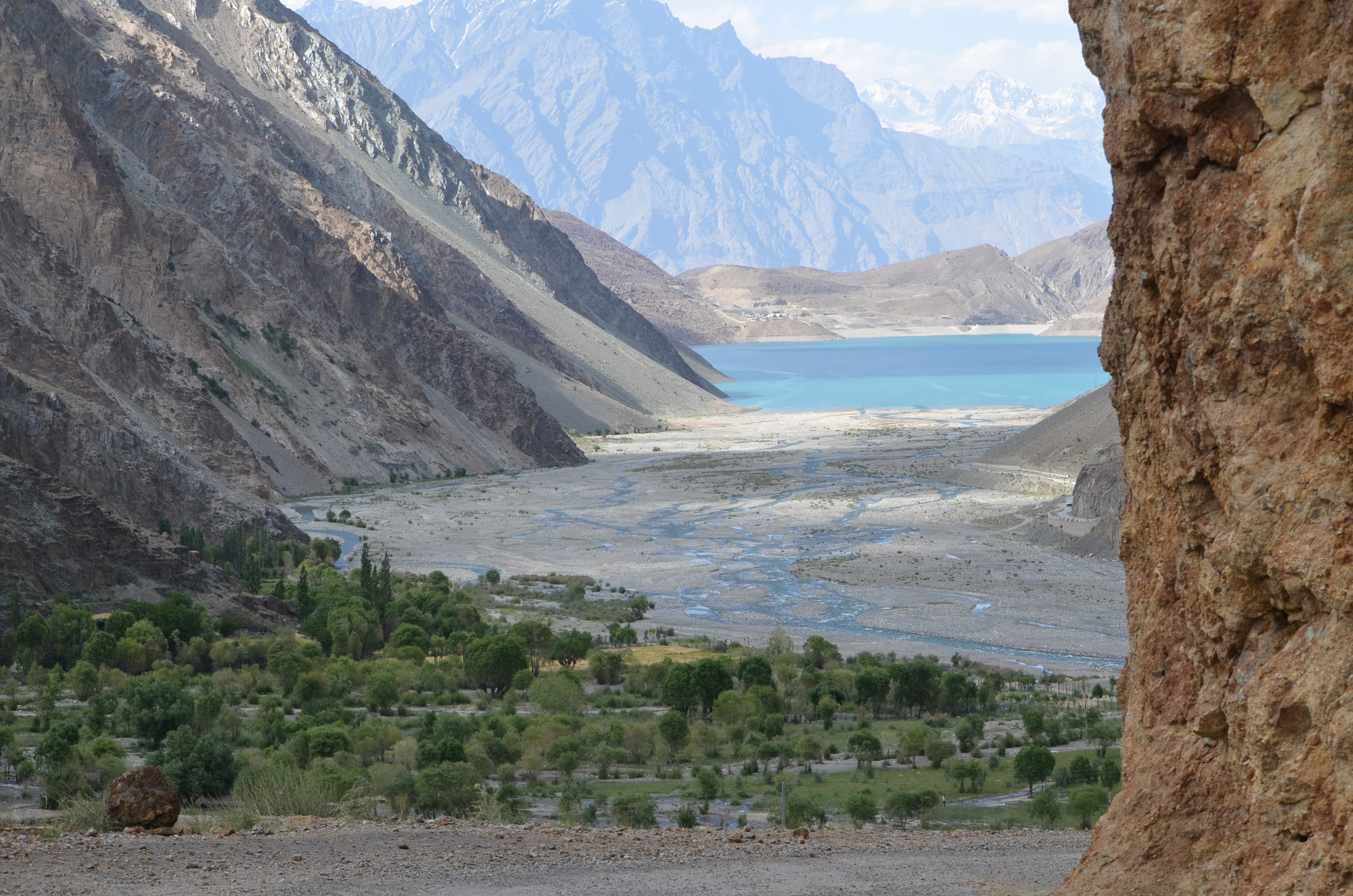
Sadpara Lake

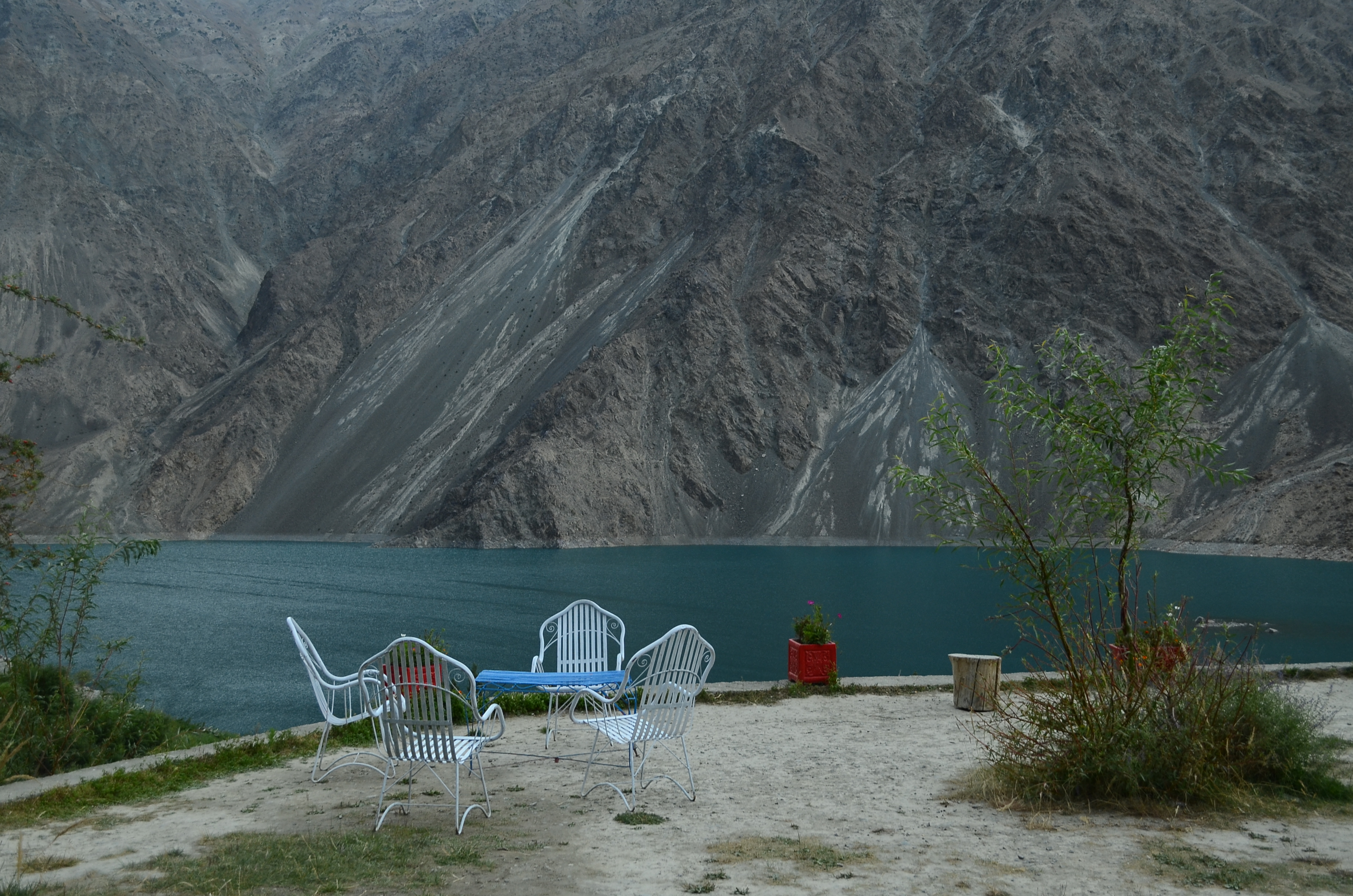
Sadpara Lake

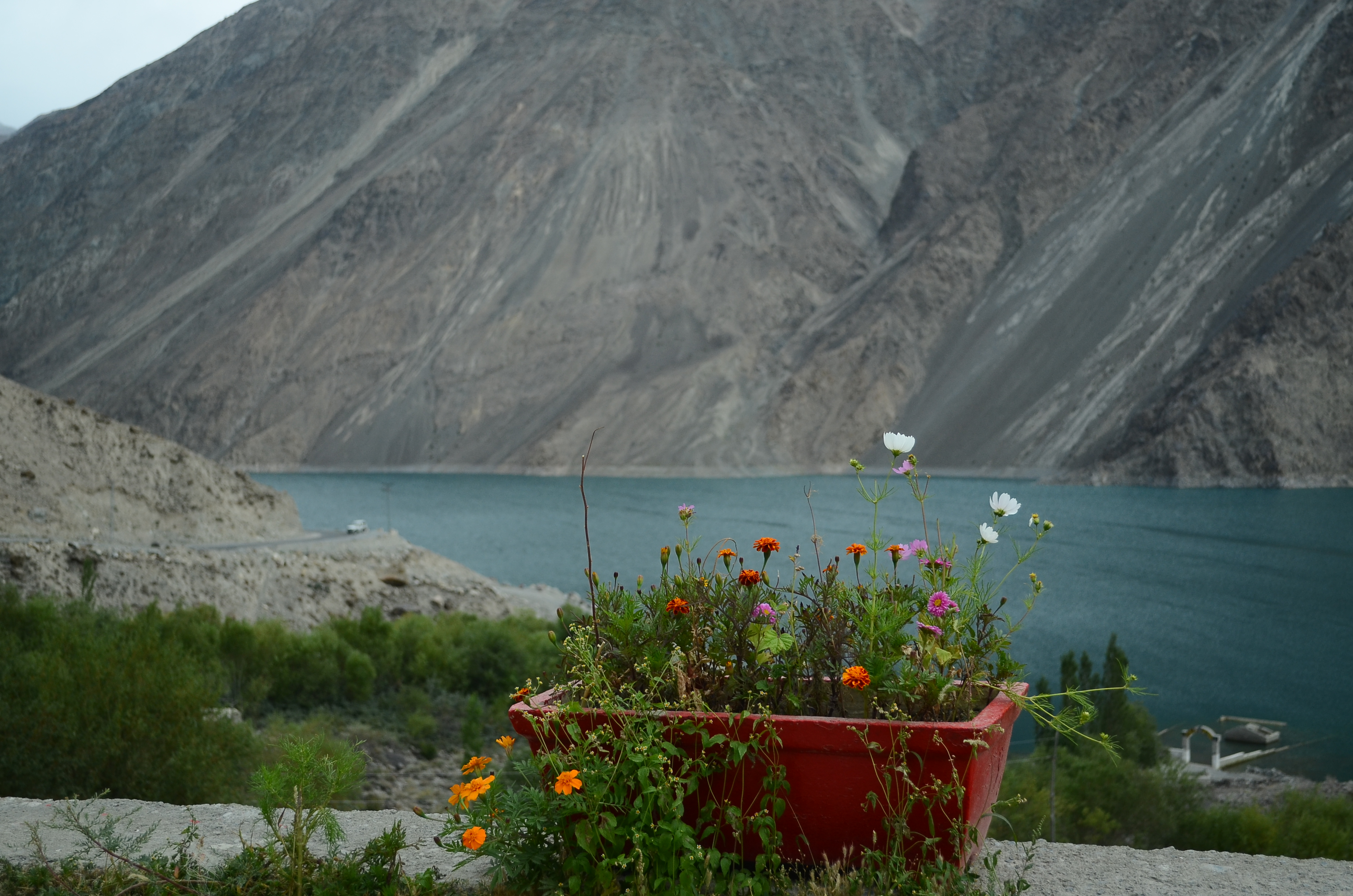
Sadpara Lake

== See also ==
- Kachura Lake
- Shangrila Lake
