= Gyal Khatun =

17th-century princess, Maqpon Dynasty, Baltistan

Gyal Khatun རྒྱལ་ཁ་ཐུན།
- Gyalmo, Silima, Tara
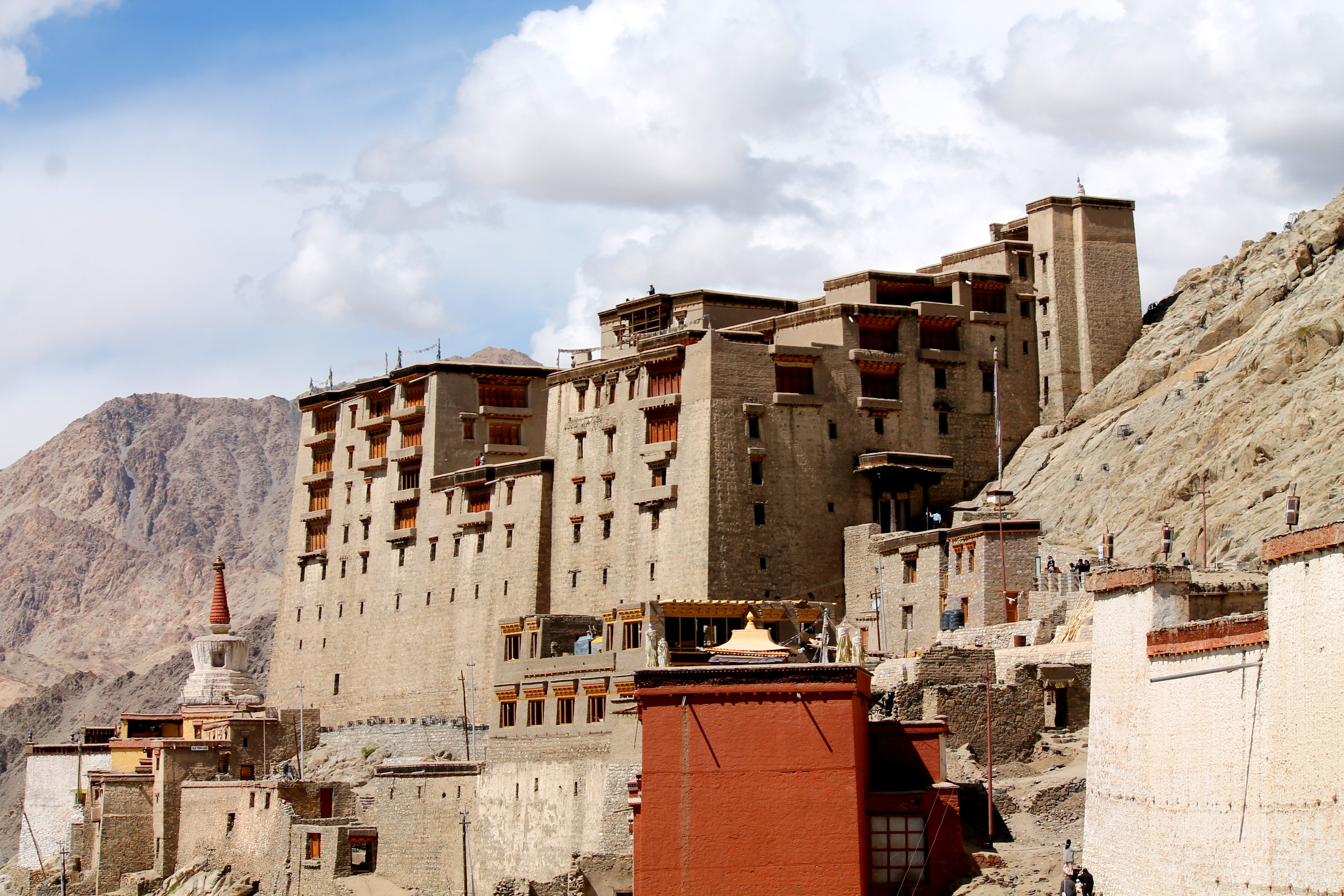
- Leh Palace, the royal residency of Gyal Khatun, built by her son Sengge Namgyal.
- Born: Skardu or Khaplu, Baltistan
- Died: Nubra, Ladakh
- Husband: Jamyang Namgyal
- Issue: Sengge Namgyal
Names
- Silima Khatun
- House: House of Maqpon or House of Yabghu (by birth); House of Namgyal (by marriage)
- Father: Yabgo Shey Gilazi or Ali Sher Khan Anchan
- Religion: Noorbakshia Islam

Gyal Khatun (Balti: རྒྱལ་ཁ་ཐུན།,lit. 'Royal Queen'), also known as Argyl Khatun, was a Balti princess and the chief consort of Jamyang Namgyal, the ruler of Ladakh in the 17th century. In Balti and Ladakhi language-songs, she is also called Silima Khatun, meaning “Untainted and Pure Queen”.

The ancestry of Gyal Khatun is disputed in the sources; while some mention her as the daughter of Balti ruler Ali Senge Anchan, others describe the raja of Khaplu, Yabgo Shey Gilazi as her father. Even though Gyal and her daughter-in-law Gyal Kelsang, who was also a Balti princess, were Muslims, the Ladakhi Buddhists viewed them in high regard. They considered them same as the Tibetan Buddhist Goddess Tara. Gyal Khatun is also famous for starting the Gelugpa order of Tibetan Buddhism in Ladakh by putting the Je Tsongkhapa sculpture in the Basgo Temple.

Gyal Khatun is respected in Ladakh because she supported both Gompas and Mosques. Her leadership brought peace between the kingdoms of Maqpon and Ladakh. Her son, Sengge Namgyal, later became the greatest ruler in Ladakhi history, known as the “Lion King of Ladakh”. The Balti and Ladakhi rulers saw her as a strong and secular role model.

== Biography ==
During his time as ruler, Jamyang Namgyal, the king of Ladakh, decided to help the Sultan of Chigtan take control of Skardu, the Makpon Kingdom. But while they were crossing the mountains in winter, Namgyal's soldiers got lost in a big snowstorm. Ali Senge Anchan's skilled army attacked Namgyal's troops and trapped them because the snow blocked all the mountain passes and valleys. This made Namgyal surrender.

Jamyang Namgyal was captured and put in prison in Skardu. Ali Senge Anchan then took over Ladakh and made It a part of the Makpon kingdom, and even reached into Western Tibet. According to the Chronicles of Ladakh, while Namgyal was in prison, he fell in love with Ali Senge's daughter, Gyal Khatun. They promised to marry each other, and Gyal Khatun became pregnant. When Ali Senge found out, he told Namgyal he could marry his daughter and go back to Ladakh with his people if he promised to be loyal to Ali Senge Anchan. However, other sources describe the Yabghu raja of Khaplu, Yabgo Shey Gilazi, as her father. Accordingly, Shey Gilazi had married her daughter to Namgyal on condition that her son would be the next ruler of Ladakh and Namgyal's sons from the first wife, Queen Tsering would have no claim over the throne of Ladakh. Furthermore Gyal Khatun was to be given the status of first queen. A daughter of Namgyal, Mandoq Gyalmo was also married to Anchan. Because of this, Jamyang's two sons, Lhawang and Stanzin had to leave Ladakh and go to Central Tibet.

=== Dowry and Wedding traditions ===
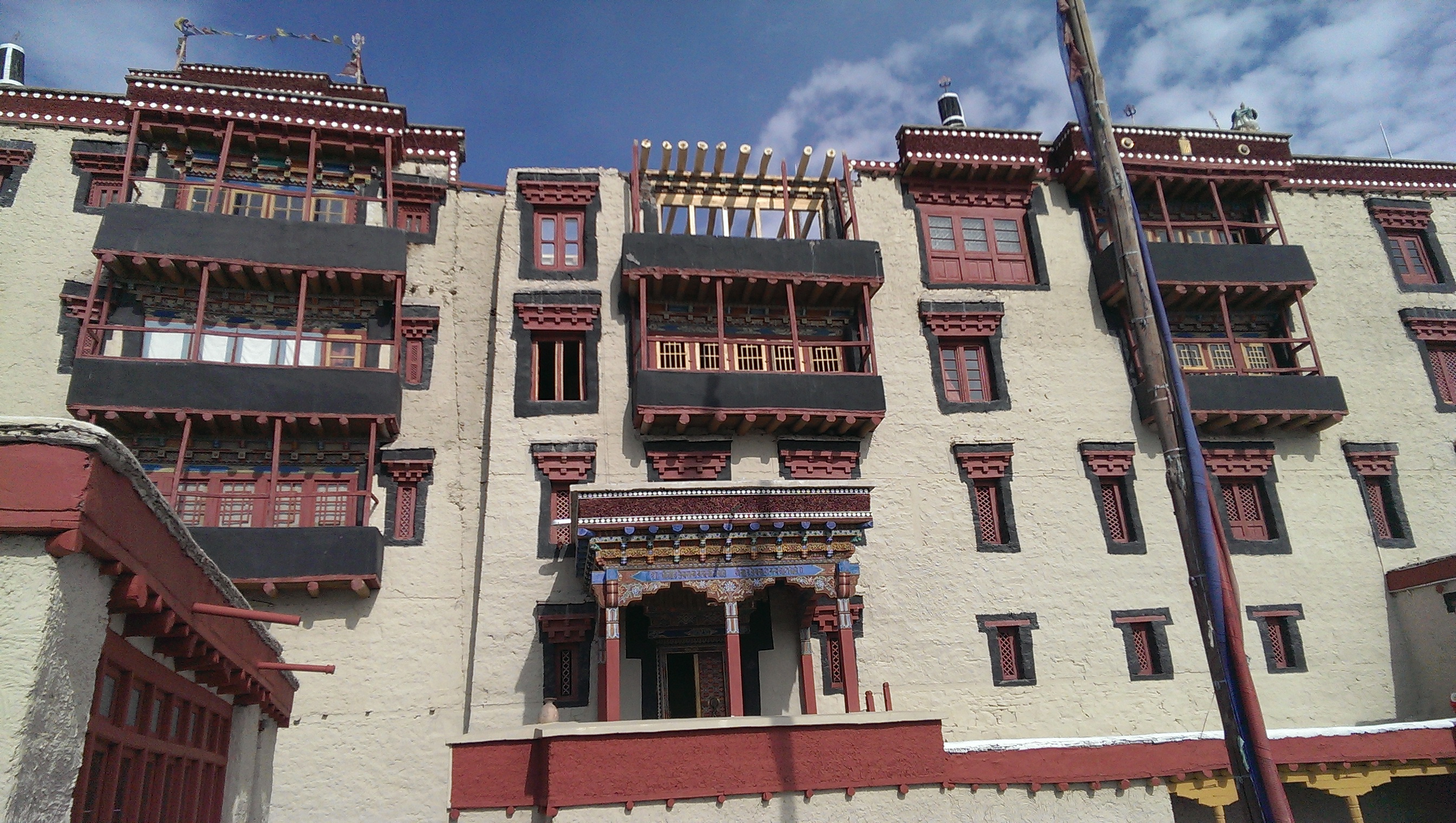
The Stok Palace, residency of Ladakhi kings.

The Balti kings were known for giving big dowries when their princesses got married. The dowry included things they could move, like gold, silver, precious stones, jewelry, expensive clothes, swords, guns, and 12 sets of kitchen cutlery. Gyal Khatun's movable dowry can be still seen at the Stok Palace Museum in Ladakh. They include the Queen’s decorated dress front and a necklace made of thirteen rows of silver beads. As part of the things they couldn't move, they also gave villages. According to local customs, a number of Muslim maids, male helpers, and a group of Balti musicians (later called Kharmon or Royal Musicians) (Note: Later, the Muslim musicians who settled in Leh had their status elevated to 'Kharmon' or 'royal musicians'. In 'A Brief History of Muslims in Ladakh', in Recent Research on Ladakh, 4 & 5, p. 190, Sheikh further reports that 'several hundred Balti Muslims are thought to have migrated from Baltistan and Purig to Shey and Chhushot during the reign of Jamyang Namgyal. Their descendants' number has now swelled to some 6,000.) were sent to Ladakh as part of Gyal Khatun’s wedding party.

According to Balti traditions, King Jamyang might have needed to give gifts to his bride's parents. This tradition, called "khamital (Balti: ཁམི་ཏལ་)", means the boy's parents send gifts to the girl's parents. (Note: 'Khamital' is a typical Balti term composed of 'kha' ('tongue') and 'mital' ('not to exceed') meaning that a seal has been fixed on the tongues of the parents of the girl (Afridi, Baltistan in History, p. 195).) After this, the boy's parents should follow the tradition of "rintho" or "onarin, where the boy's parents should pay for the milk the girl drank when she was a baby. Once they pay with 24 tolas of gold and 24 goats, the wedding date is set. The Ladakhi Lamas welcomed Gyal Khatun as the Buddhist god of long life, the White Tara.

=== Succession as ruler ===
After King Jamyang Namgyal died, Gyal Khatun took over the government while her young son, Sengge Namgyal, grew up. She is famous for being Sengge Namgyal's mother. Sengge Namgyal was called the "Lion King of Ladakh". There is a famous ballad that tells the story of Sengge Namgyal's birth, when he was held by his mother, Gyal Khatun, also known as Zi-Zi: (Note: Zi-zi was a title given to queens of Ladakh and Baltistan. Francke (Antiquities of Indian Tibet, p. 146) .)

“Today the old king’s name shall resound through the verse, for see the lovely babe his grandson, born today. see him in the arms of his mother, this child whose name shall be famous all the world, see him in the arms of Zi-Zi, the Queen. This child whose name shall be famous in all the world”.

== Legacy ==
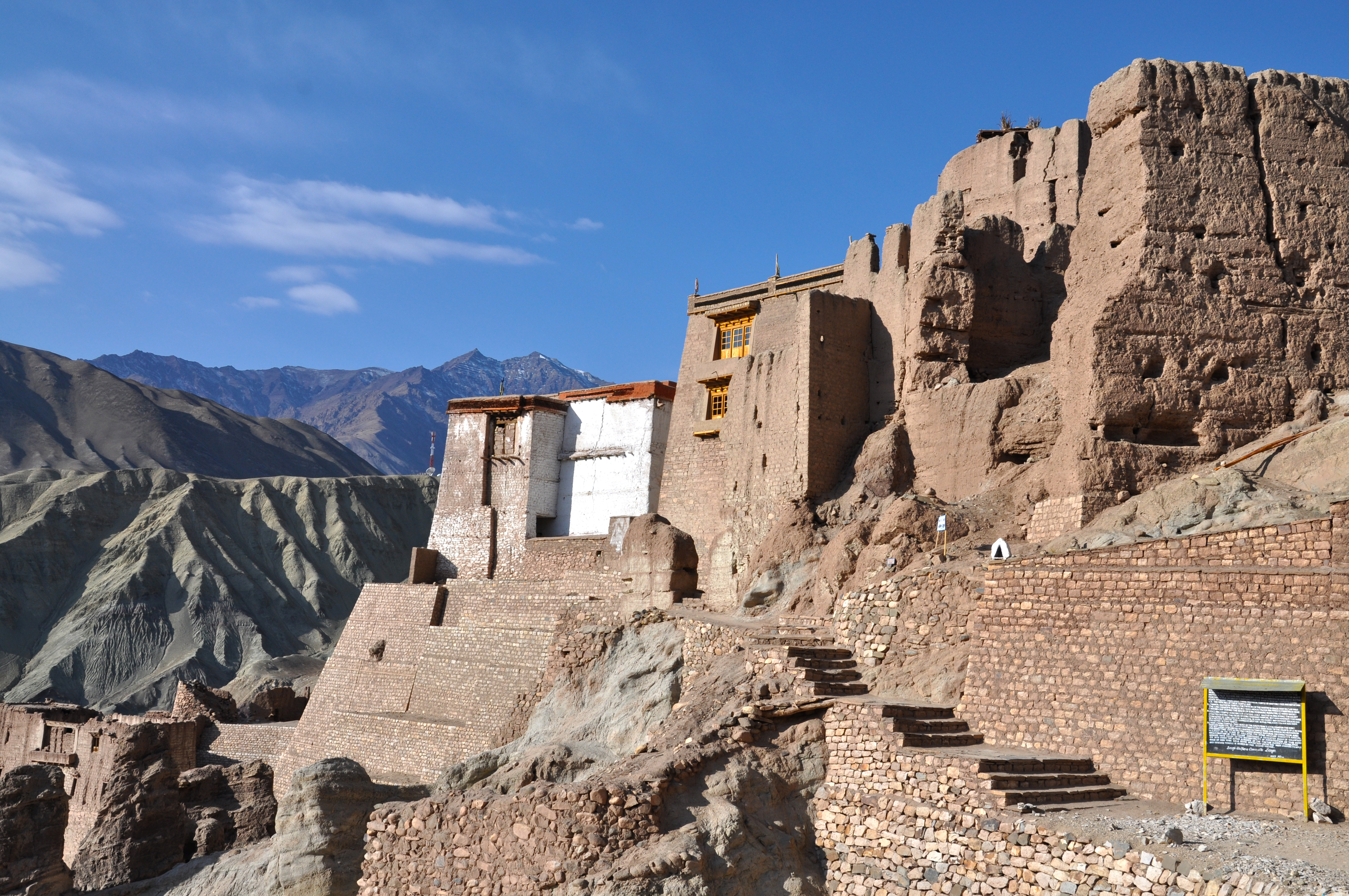
Basgo Monastery, built by Gyal Khatun and later completed by Sengge Namgyal.

In Ladakh, Gyal Khatun is seen as a patron (someone who supports) of both mosques and Buddhist temples. Her son, Sengge Namgyal, kept working on the Maitreya temple that his mother, Gyal Khatun, had started. Gyal Khatun is known as the Royal supporter of Chamba Lakhang, and she also gave jewelry for Maitreya's statue in the second temple, Serzang Lakhang. To honor his mother, Sengge Namgyal made the original Kache mosque in Leh. But more buildings were added to the mosque because of a partnership with the Mughal emperor Aurangzeb. Gyal Khatun is praised for building many small mosques in Shey, Leh, and Nubra. People in Ladakh sing folk songs about her with the title Silima Khatun, meaning "The Untainted and Pure Queen," showing how much they admire her. There's a Ladakhi folk song called The Song of Silima Khatun that's all about praising the Queen:

My famous queen is like the rising sun,
The precious Silima Queen is brilliant like a vision of light.
My famous queen is like the Shining full moon
To he lee [utterance to fill the rhythm]
My precious Silima queen you are brilliant like a vision of light,
Even your royal line is god-like, brilliant like a vision of light.
Silima Khatun your royal line is the line of sugar-cane wood,
Precious Silima Queen your race may flourish like leaves.
Your name and qualities have become known all over the world.
Oh precious Silima Khatun Queen, brilliant like a vision of light.

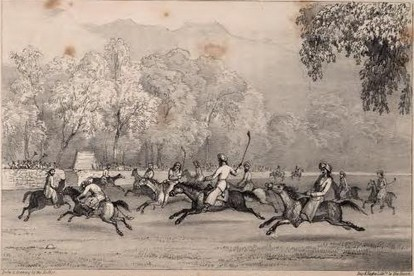
Polo match in Skardu.

Gyal Khatun is also famous for starting the Gelugpa order of Tibetan Buddhism in Ladakh. She put a Tsongkhapa sculpture in the Basgo Temple, also called the Kalzand Drolma Temple. Gyal Khatun supported both Muslim and Buddhist places of worship in Ladakh. Her being in the Namgyal family brought peace between the two kingdoms. Even after King Jamyang Namgyal died, Gyal Khatun still played a big role in Ladakh's politics and religion. She supported Mahayana and Tantric Buddhism and helped build religious buildings.

Gyal Khatun is known for bringing Balti music and instruments like Drums and Oboes to Ladakh from Baltistan. These instruments were part of her dowry and are now important in Ladakhi music. She also introduced Polo, a traditional sport, to Ladakh from Baltistan. The Namgyal kings built private mosques in Leh and Shey for Gyal Khatun and her servants, where she kept practicing Islam until she died.

=== Ali Senge Anchans Dream ===
Gyal Khatun's life is connected to mystical and divine things, which makes her very important. In the book "Antiquities of Indian Tibet," A. H. Francke talks about a special event involving Gyal Khatun's father, Ali Senge Anchan. In a dream, Ali Senge saw a lion (Sengge) coming out of the river near the castle and going into Gyal Khatun's body. According to the royal records, this dream made people believe that Gyal Khatun was a form of the Tibetan Buddhist Goddess Tara, who saves people and shows kindness. Francke translated a verse from the original manuscript as:

“Yesterday in a dream, I saw a lion [emerging] from the river in front [of the castle]; And, jumping at Rgyal-Kha-thun, he disappeared into her body, At the same time also, That girl conceived. Now it is certain that she will give birth to a male child, Whose name ye shall call Sen-ge-rnam-gyal!”

This event in Gyal Khatun's life made her respected in the region's history. Her legacy is more than just being a queen because her special connection affected events and decided what happened to her family. This influence led to her son, Sengge Namgyal, becoming the famous Lion King of Ladakh.

== Also See ==
- Religion In Ladakh
