= Sermik =

Sermik Gold-Eye
- Village
- Motto(s): love & Peace
- Location in the Gilgit Baltistan region Sermik (Pakistan)
- Coordinates: 35°10′9″N 75°54′23″E
- Country: Pakistan
- Region: Gilgit-Baltistan
- District: Skardu
- Time zone: PST
  - Summer (DST): GMT+5:00

Sermik is a village in Skardu District in the Gilgit-Baltistan region of northeastern Pakistan. It is approximately 45 km from Skardu. Sermik is located approximately in the center of District Kharmang, District Ghangche and District Skardu. It is among the most beautiful places in Gilgit Baltistan, with gorgeous mountains, captivating culture, and a large forest. The mighty Indus passes from here. Most farmers grow potatoes.

== Geography ==
Sermik lies in the Sermik Valley on the western side of the Indus River, approximately 37 miles (60 km) by road southeast of Skardu. It lies to the southwest of Keris, to the north of Mehdiabad. The road following the Indus to the southeast of Sermik leads to near Hunderman on the Indian border.

There is a branch of the F.G. Boys High School in Sermik. Al-Mashriq Public School was established in 1996 by NGO EASTS (Educational & Social Team Services).

There are rock paintings at Chaghe Bress above Sermik Dam and Hydro Power Station in the vicinity.
