= Tolti =

Pakistani village

Tolti طولتی
- Union Council
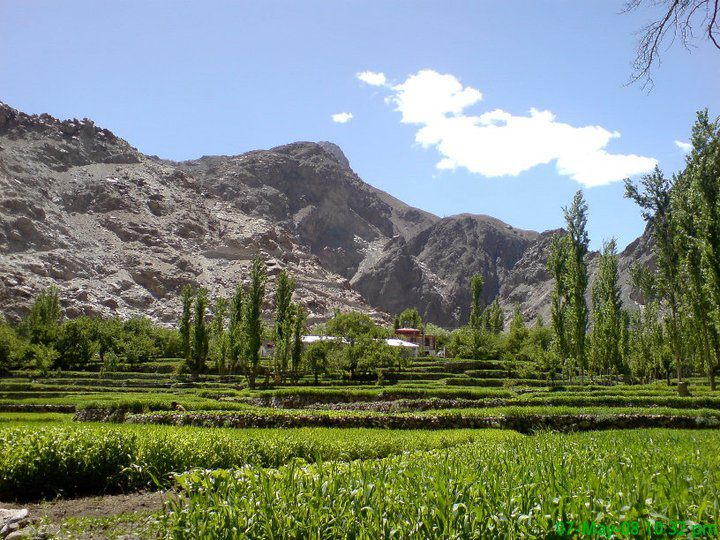

- Location in Pakistan Tolti (Pakistan)
- Coordinates: 35°01′43″N 76°05′33″E
- Administering country: Pakistan
- Autonomous territory: Gilgit Baltistan
- Baltistan division: Kharmang
- Time zone: UTC+5 (PST)
- Postal code: 16450

Tolti (Urdu: طولتی) is a town that serves as the administrative capital of Kharmang District of Pakistan-administered Gilgit-Baltistan in the disputed Kashmir region. The village lies on the left bank of the Indus river, and is approximately 35 km south-east of the confluence of the Indus from the Shyok.

== Notable residents ==
- Ghulam Hassan Lobsang, a renowned writer and author of the first Balti dictionary
