= Mandok Gyalmo =

16th century Ladakhi princess

Mandok
- Gyalmo
- Born: Leh, Ladakh
- Died: Skardu, Baltistan
- Husband: Ali Senge Anchan
- House: House of Namgyal (by birth); House of Maqpon (by marriage)
- Father: Jamyang Namgyal
- Mother: Tsering Gyalmo
- Religion: Tibetan Buddhism

Mandok Gyalmo (also spelt as Mindoq or Mindok, lit. 'Flower Queen') was a 17th-century Ladakhi princess and queen of Maqpon king Ali Senge Anchan. She was a daughter of ruler of Ladakh, Jamyang Namgyal, and a half-sister of his son and successor Sengge Namgyal.

== Biography ==
Mandok was a daughter of Jamyang, who was enthroned in 1595 as the Gyalpo of Ladakh. Being an ambitious ruler, he invaded the small Muslim principalities in Purig and Baltistan to bring them under the Ladakhi control. During this period Ali Senge Anchan was the ruler of Skardu. Anchan, leading an alliance consisting of Yabghu Raja of Khaplu and Amacha Raja of Shigar, invaded Ladakh. He bypassed Purig where Jamyang was present with his army through Marol and captured Leh, the capital of Ladakh. Soon the Ladakhi king was made prisoner as well. Anchan gave the throne of Ladakh back to Jamyang after marrying his daughter, Mandok. In return Jamyang was given hands of a Balti princess in marriage, Gyal Khatun, on the condition that her son would be his successor in Ladakh.

Mandok Gyalmo has been sometimes wrongly described as a Mughal princess in the Balti traditions. According to Balti folklore, she brought musicians and artisans with her and introduced musical instruments such as the surnai, karnai, dhol and chang in Baltistan. A Balti song (sbal-glu), Hilal Bagh, narrates her arrival to Skardu with a large procession of men and horses.

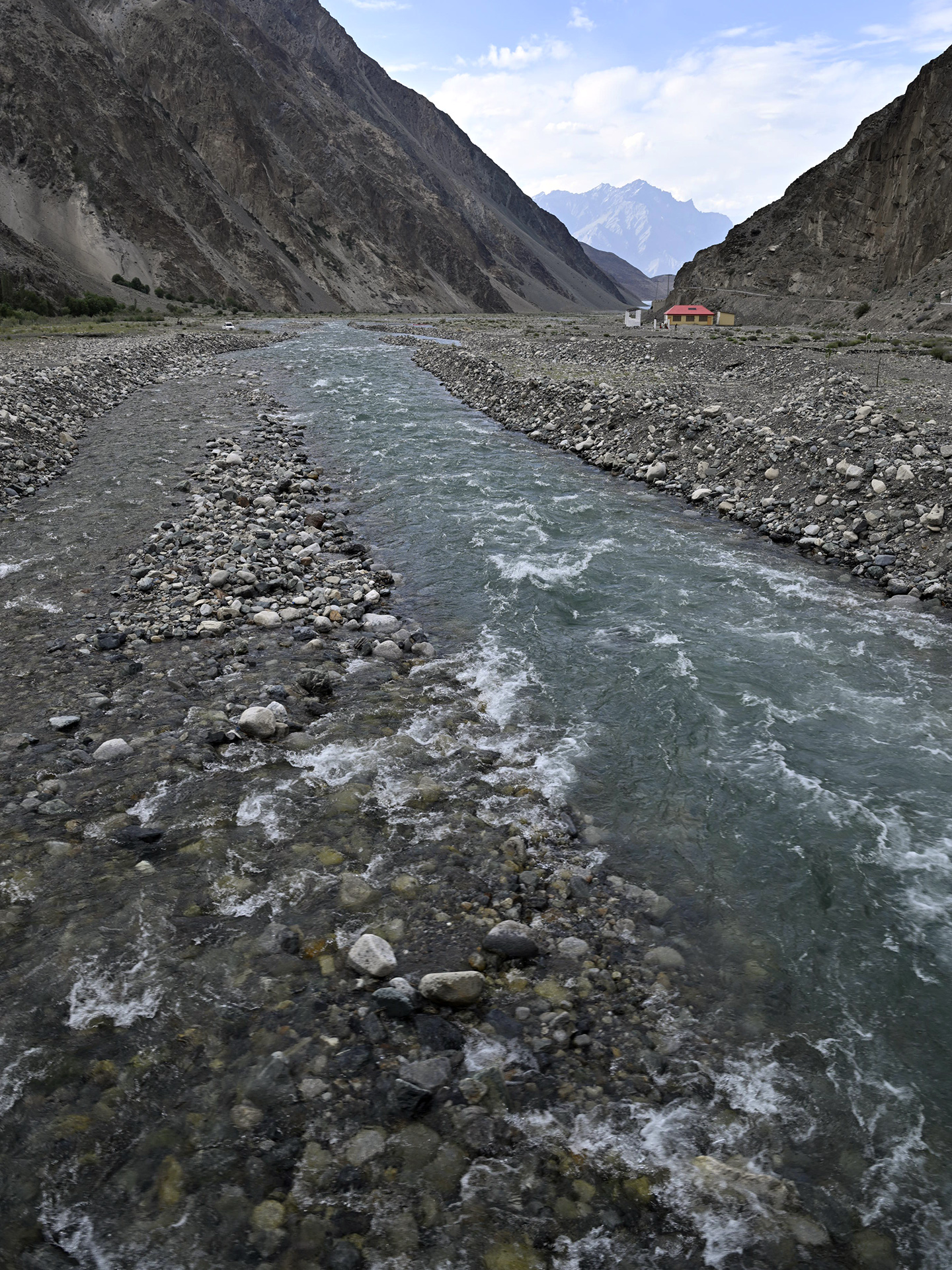
Satpara Stream was taken out of Satpara Lake by Mandok Gyalmo for irrigation and water supply to Skardu.

After Anchan left for the conquest of Gilgit, Mandok, wishing to live separately from the people of Skardu, constructed a large palace, known as Mandoq Khar below the Kharpocho Fort, where its remains still exist. The palace was destroyed by the Dogra forces during the invasion of Baltistan. She also constructed a garden with marble pavilions, known as halo-bagh, which was irrigated by a stream called Gangopi Harkong, taken out from Satpara Lake through an aqueduct constructed of cyclopean stones. A Tibetan inscription has been discovered recording her name as Mendoq-rGualmo in context of construction of the channel in c. 1600/1610. The Satpara stream, where now Satpara Dam has been constructed, remains the primary water source for the Skardu city till today.
