= Kharmang District =

Administrative unit of Gilgit-Baltistan, Pakistan

Kharmang District ضلع کھرمنگ
- District of Gilgit-Baltistan administered by Pakistan
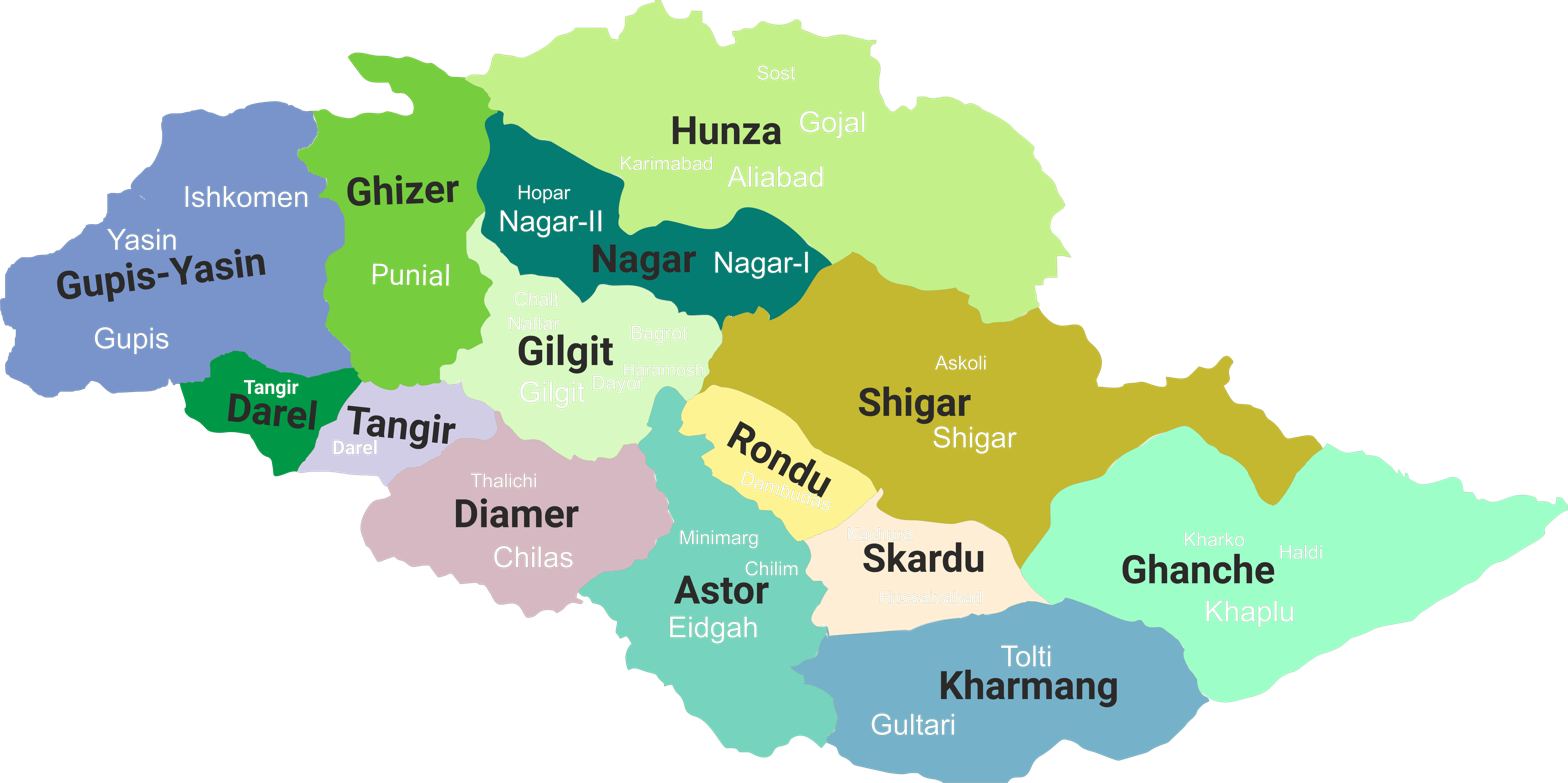
- Map of Gilgit-Baltistan showing its districts
- Interactive map of Kharmang District
- Coordinates (Tolti): 35°1′43″N 76°5′33″E
- Territory: Gilgit-Baltistan
- Division: Baltistan Division
- Headquarters: Tolti

Government
  - Type: District Administration
  - Deputy Commissioner: Jaffar Ali (DMS)
  - District Police Officer: Ahmed Shabbir (PSP)
  - District Health Officer: N/A

Area
  - Total: 6,144 km^{2} (2,372 sq mi)

Population (2023)
  - Total: 61,304
  - Density: 9.978/km^{2} (25.84/sq mi)
- Number of tehsils: 3

Kharmang District (Urdu:ضلع کھرمنگ) is a district of Pakistan-administered Gilgit-Baltistan in the disputed Kashmir region. Located in the district is the Kharmang Valley, which is one of the five main valleys in the Baltistan Division.

== Geography ==
Map of Gilgit–Baltistan with the Kharmang District highlighted in red

It is bounded on the north by the Skardu District, on the north-east by the Ghanche District, on the south by the Indian-administered Kargil and Leh districts, and on the west by the Astore District. Its district headquarters is at Tolti. Less than 5% of the district consists of alpine pastures, with over 93% of remaining area being permanently snow covered.

== Historical background ==
The Kharmang District is centred around Kharmang Valley section of the larger Indus Valley. Historically ruled by Maqpon dynasty of Skardu, Kharmang was conquered by Dogras in 1840. In the princely state of Jammu and Kashmir, established under British suzerainty in 1846, Kharmang was initially a part of Skardu tehsil of Ladakh Wazarat. In 1901 it was transferred to the newly created Kargil tehsil. Following 1947 Gilgit Rebellion it along with rest of Baltistan became part of Pakistan. It remained a subdivision of Skardu District until 2015, when it was granted district status.

== Education ==
According to the Alif Ailaan Pakistan District Education Rankings 2017, Kharmang was ranked 119th out of 155 districts with respect to school infrastructure and facilities. In Kharmang there are multiple government and private organization schools which includes Middle School Mayurdu, Higher secondary school Mayurdu
