= Bharatiya Janata Party, Ladakh =

Ladakh affiliate of the Bharatiya Janata Party

Bharatiya Janata Party, Ladakh རྒྱ་གར་མི་སེར་ཚོགས་པ། - ལ་དྭགས། भारतीय जनता पार्टी, लद्दाख
- Abbreviation: BJP
- President: Tashi Gyalson Kachu
- Founder: Bharatiya Janata Party
- Founded: 20 July 2020 (6 years ago)
- Split from: BJP Jammu and Kashmir
- Preceded by: Bharatiya Janata Party (Jammu and Kashmir unit)
- Headquarters: BJP Office, Tayary Rong, Near HB Housing Colony, Choklamsar Road, Leh, Ladakh - 194101
- Newspaper: Kamal Sandesh
- Youth wing: Bharatiya Janata Yuva Morcha
- Women's wing: BJP Mahila Morcha
- Labour wing: Bharatiya Mazdoor Sangh
- Peasant's wing: Bharatiya Kisan Sangh
- Ideology: Hindutva; Integral humanism; Conservatism; Regional interests
- Political position: Right-wing
- International affiliation: International Democrat Union; Asia Pacific Democrat Union
- Colours: Saffron
- Alliance: National Democratic Alliance
- Seats in Rajya Sabha: 0
- Seats in Lok Sabha: 0 / 1
- Seats in Ladakh Autonomous Hill Development Council: 0 / 100

Election symbol
- Lotus

Party flag

Website
- www.bjp.org/ladakh-state-office

The Bharatiya Janata Party – Ladakh (pronounced [bʱaːɾ(ə)ˈtiːjə dʒən(ə)ˈtaː ˈpaːrʈiː]; lit. 'Indian People's Party'), commonly known as BJP Ladakh, is the Ladakh union territory unit of the Bharatiya Janata Party. It was established as an independent union territory unit following the formation of the Union Territory of Ladakh in 2019. The Ladakh unit is headquartered in Leh. Tashi Gyalson Kachu is the current president of the BJP Ladakh unit, having assumed office in July 2025.

The party maintains an electoral presence in all 8 Ladakh Autonomous Hill Development Council in the union territory. In the 2020 LAHDC Leh election, the BJP won 15 of the 26 directly elected seats and formed the council administration. In the 2023 LAHDC Kargil election, the BJP won 2 of the 26 directly elected seats.

== History ==
The Bharatiya Janata Party had a longstanding presence in the Ladakh region when it was a part of the former state of Jammu and Kashmir. Prior to 2019, the region's party affairs were managed directly under the Jammu and Kashmir BJP unit. The BJP historically started the Sindhu Darshan Festival when the Sindhu River was re-discovered in Ladakh. The RSS also runs several schools. The Jammu and Kashmir Reorganisation Act, 2019, bifurcated the state into two Union Territories, Jammu & Kashmir and Ladakh. This led the BJP to establish a chapter in Ladakh. In July 2020, Jamyang Tsering Namgyal, the then Member of Parliament from the Ladakh constituency who became popular for defending the abrogation of Article 370, was appointed as the first president of the newly independent Ladakh BJP unit. Under his leadership, the party successfully navigated the Ladakh Autonomous Hill Development Council, Leh (LAHDC Leh) elections later that year. In January 2022, J. P. Nadda, the national president of the BJP, appointed Phunchok Stanzin, a former executive councillor of LAHDC Leh, as the new president of the Ladakh BJP unit, replacing Namgyal. In July 2025, Tashi Gyalson kachu was appointed as the president of the Ladakh BJP unit, succeeding Stanzin.

== Electoral Performance ==
=== Lok Sabha Elections ===
The Ladakh Lok Sabha constituency has been contested by the Bharatiya Janata Party (BJP) since the formation of the Union territory of Ladakh. The party won the constituency in both the 2014 and 2019 Indian general elections. In 2014, BJP candidate Thupstan Chhewang was elected, while in 2019 Jamyang Tsering Namgyal retained the seat for the party with a majority of 10,930 votes.

In the 2024 Indian general election, BJP candidate Tashi Gyalson received 31,956 votes and was defeated by independent candidate Mohmad Haneefa, who received 65,259 votes. The result marked the BJP's loss of the Ladakh constituency after two consecutive victories.

Ladakh Lok Sabha elections
Year	Lok Sabha	Party leader	Seats contested	Seats won	Change in seats	(%) of votes	Vote swing	Popular vote	Outcome
2014	16th	Thupstan Chhewang	1	1 / 1	▲1	26.18	new	31,289	Won
2019	17th	Jamyang Tsering Namgyal	1	1 / 1	Steady	33.94	7.76 pp	42,914	Won
2024	18th	Tashi Gyalson	1	0 / 1	▼1	18.96	14.98 pp	31,956	Lost

=== Local Council Elections ===
The BJP maintains a strong presence in the Ladakh Autonomous Hill Development Council (LAHDC) Leh. During the 2020 LAHDC Leh elections, the BJP secured a majority by winning 15 out of the 26 elected seats, successfully forming the government. In contrast, the party has historically faced tougher electoral contests in the Shia Muslim-majority Kargil district, where the Jammu and Kashmir National Conference and Indian National Congress have generally dominated the LAHDC Kargil.

Ladakh Autonomous Hill Development Councils elections
Year	Council	Party leader	Seats contested	Seats won	Change in seats	(%) of seats	Outcome
2020	LAHDC Leh	Tashi Gyalson	26	15 / 26	▼3	57.69	Majority
2023	LAHDC Kargil		26	2 / 26	▲1	7.69	Lost
2026	LAHDC Leh		22	0 / 22			
2026	LAHDC Kargil		7	0 / 21			
2026	LAHDC Sankoo		8	0 / 13			
2026	LAHDC Changthang		10	1 / 10			
2026	LAHDC Sham		9	0 / 9			
2026	LAHDC Zanskar		9	0 / 9			
2026	LAHDC Nubra		8	0 / 9			
2026	LAHDC Drass		7	0 / 7			

== Leadership ==
=== List of Presidents ===
No.	Name	Term start	Term end	Duration	References
1	Jamyang Tsering Namgyal	20 July 2020	9 January 2022	1 year, 173 days	
2	Phunchok Stanzin	9 January 2022	3 July 2025	3 years, 175 days	
3	Tashi Gyalson Kachu	3 July 2025	Incumbent	1 year, 142 days	

== See also ==
- Bharatiya Janata Party – Jammu and Kashmir
- Ladakh Autonomous Hill Development Council, Leh
- Ladakh Autonomous Hill Development Council, Kargil
- 2024 Indian general election in Ladakh
