= 2026 Ladakh local elections =

2026 election in the UT of Ladakh, India

- 21 November 2026 & 4 December 2026

100 seats across 8 Hill Councils; 192 Panchayat Halqas (Sarpanch); 1,428 Panchayat Wards (Panch); 38 Municipal Wards (2 committees)
- Turnout: Phase 1 : Sarpanch: 70.03% Panch: 73.60% Municipal: 52.40%; Phase 2 (LAHDC): TBD

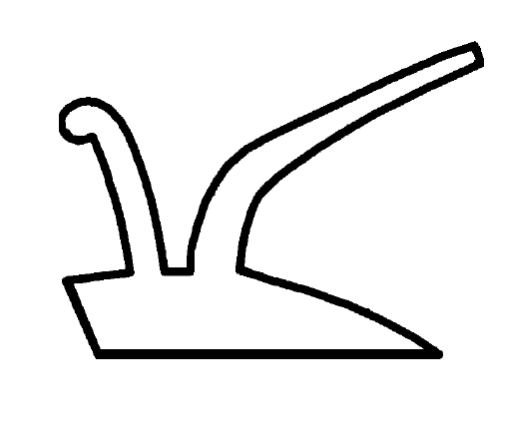
| | Majority party | Minority party | Third party |
|---|---|---|---|
| Party | INC | BJP | JKNC |
| Last election | 19 (LAHDCs) | 17 (LAHDCs) | 12 (LAHDCs) |
| Seats won | 1 | 1 |

Local elections in Ladakh were held in two phases between November-December 2026. Polling for Panchayats and Municipal Committees took place on 21 November 2026 and for the 100 seats of the eight Ladakh Autonomous Hill Development Council (LAHDC) elections took place on 4 December 2026 .

== Background ==
These marked the first municipal and panchayat polls since Ladakh became a Union Territory in 2019, and the first Hill Council elections following the reorganisation of Ladakh into eight districts.

== Schedule ==
=== Phase 1: Panchayat and Municipal Elections ===
| Poll event | Panchayat date | Municipal Committee date |
|---|---|---|
| Notification issued | 26 October 2026 | 23 October 2026 |
| Last date for making nominations | 2 November 2026 | 5 November 2026 |
| Scrutiny of nominations | 3 November 2026 | 6 November 2026 |
| Last date for withdrawal | 5 November 2026 | 9 November 2026 |
| Polling | 21 November 2026 | 21 November 2026 |
| Completion of election process | 8 December 2026 | 8 December 2026 |

=== Phase 2: LAHDC Elections ===
| Poll event | Date |
|---|---|
| Last date for making nominations | 17 November 2026 |
| Scrutiny of nominations | 18 November 2026 |
| Last date for withdrawal | 20 November 2026 |
| Polling | 4 December 2026 |
| Completion of election process | 8 December 2026 |

== Seats ==
=== Phase 1: Panchayat and Municipal Committees ===
| Local body | Total seats/wards | Elected unopposed | Contested seats/wards |
|---|---|---|---|
| Panchayat Halqas (Sarpanch) | 192 | 55 | 137 |
| Panchayat Wards (Panch) | 1,428 | 1,186 | 242 |
| Leh Municipal Committee | 21 | 0 | 21 |
| Kargil Municipal Committee | 17 | 4 | 13 |
| Total | 1,658 | 1,245 | 413 |

=== Phase 2: Ladakh Autonomous Hill Development Councils ===
| Hill Council | Total seats | Elected unopposed | Uncontested | Polling on 4 Dec |
|---|---|---|---|---|
| Leh | 22 | 0 | 0 | 22 |
| Kargil | 21 | 1 (INC) | 3 (Note: Shakar-Chiktan subdivision's 3 constituency i.e.- Khangral, Shakar, and Chiktan boycotted election due to delimitation issue) | 17 |
| Sankoo | 13 | 0 | 0 | 13 |
| Changthang | 10 | 1 (BJP) | 0 | 9 |
| Nubra | 9 | 0 | 0 | 9 |
| Sham | 9 | 0 | 0 | 9 |
| Zanskar | 9 | 0 | 0 | 9 |
| Drass | 7 | 0 | 0 | 7 |
| Total | 100 (Note: 36 seats reserved for women) | 2 | 3 | 95 |

== Turnout ==
=== Phase 1: Panchayat and Municipal Committees ===
==== Panchayat elections (district-wise) ====
| District | Sarpanch turnout (%) | Panch turnout (%) |
|---|---|---|
| Sankoo | 77.00% | 78.75% |
| Drass | 71.31% | 73.95% |
| Kargil | 69.93% | 72.47% |
| Nubra | 64.41% | 78.71% |
| Zanskar | 60.63% | 62.71% |
| Changthang | 59.97% | 66.36% |
| Sham | 56.75% | 61.17% |
| Leh | 55.80% | 52.70% |
| Total (as of 4:00 PM) | 65.20% | 68.83% |

==== Municipal committees ====
| Municipal committee | Turnout (%) |
|---|---|
| Kargil Municipal Committee | 74.75% |
| Leh Municipal Committee | 45.25% |
| Total | 52.40% |

== Results ==
==== Phase 1: Panchayat and Municipal Committees ====
| Local body | Contested | Results |
|---|---|---|
| Panchayat Halqas (Sarpanch) | 137 | Counting on 8 December 2026 |
| Panchayat Wards (Panch) | 242 | Counting on 8 December 2026 |
| Leh Municipal Committee | 21 | Counting on 8 December 2026 |
| Kargil Municipal Committee | 13 | Counting on 8 December 2026 |
| Total | 413 | |

==== Phase 2: Ladakh Autonomous Hill Development Councils ====
| – | 1 | 1 | – |
| JKNC | INC | BJP | IND |

| Hill Council | Total seats | Contested seats | INC | BJP | JKNC | IND |
| Hill Council | Total seats | Contested seats | Seats | Seats | Seats | Seats |
|---|---|---|---|---|---|---|
| Leh | 22 | 22 | | | | |
| Kargil | 21 | 17 | 1 | | | |
| Sankoo | 13 | 13 | | | | |
| Changthang | 10 | 9 | | 1 | | |
| Nubra | 9 | 9 | | | | |
| Sham | 9 | 9 | | | | |
| Zanskar | 9 | 9 | | | | |
| Drass | 7 | 7 | | | | |
| Total | 100 | 95 (Note: 2 won by unopposed and 3 called boycott) | 1 | 1 | 0 | 0 |

== See also ==
- 2026 elections in India
- 2026 Ladakh Autonomous Hill Development Council, Leh election
- 2026 Ladakh Autonomous Hill Development Council, Kargil election
- 2026 Ladakh Autonomous Hill Development Council, Sankoo election
