= LAHDC =

LAHDC is an abbreviation of "Ladakh Autonomous Hill Development Council". It may refer to:

- Ladakh Autonomous Hill Development Council, Changthang
- Ladakh Autonomous Hill Development Council, Drass
- Ladakh Autonomous Hill Development Council, Kargil
- Ladakh Autonomous Hill Development Council, Leh
- Ladakh Autonomous Hill Development Council, Nubra
- Ladakh Autonomous Hill Development Council, Sankoo
- Ladakh Autonomous Hill Development Council, Sham
- Ladakh Autonomous Hill Development Council, Zanskar
