= Administration of Ladakh =

Local government in India

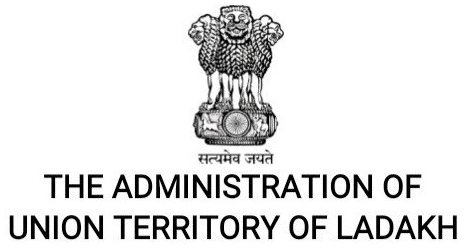
- Seat of Government: Leh, Kargil
- Country: India

Executive branch
- Lieutenant Governor: Vinai Kumar Saxena
- Chief Secretary: Ashish Kundra, IAS

Judiciary
- High Court: High Court of Jammu and Kashmir and Ladakh
- Chief Justice: Pushpendra Singh Bhati

The Administration of Union Territory of Ladakh (sic) is the governing authority of the Indian union territory of Ladakh and its eight districts. The Administration is led by a Lieutenant Governor appointed by the President of India who acts on behalf of the central Government of India. Ladakh does not have an elected legislative assembly. The eight districts of Ladakh elect their own autonomous district councils, the Ladakh Autonomous Hill Development Council, which have competence over a range of domestic affairs.

== History of Ladakh ==
Ladakh became part of the Dominion of India on 26 October 1947 as a region of the State of Jammu and Kashmir. The status of the region was upgraded to that of a Revenue and Administrative Division of Jammu and Kashmir in February 2019 and Ladakh became a union territory in its own right a few months later on 31 October 2019.

== Executive and legislative authority ==
Ladakh is administered as a union territory without a legislative assembly by virtue of Article 240 (2) of the Constitution of India and under the terms of the Jammu and Kashmir Reorganisation Act, 2019. Union territory of Ladakh will be administered by the President acting through a Lieutenant Governor to be appointed by him under Article 239. The President may make regulations for the peace, progress and good government of the Union territory of Ladakh under article 240. The Lieutenant Governor shall be assisted by advisor(s) to be appointed by the Central Government.

== Judiciary and law enforcement ==
Ladakh is under the jurisdiction of the Jammu and Kashmir High Court which sits in Jammu and Srinagar. Ladakh Bench of High Court of Jammu and Kashmir and Ladakh established in 2026 for better accessibility. Law enforcement is the responsibility of the Ladakh Police which is under the authority of the Ministry of Home Affairs of the Government of India.

== Office holders ==
- Lieutenant Governor of Ladakh – Vinai Kumar Saxena
  - Advisor to the Lieutenant Governor –Ashish Kundra,IAS
  - Principal Secretary – Dr. Pawan Kotwal, IAS
  - Commissioner Secretary – Ajeet Kumar Sahu, IAS
  - Divisional Commissioner – Saugat Biswas, IAS
  - Inspector General of Police – S. S. Khandare, IPS
  - Secretary – Ravinder Kumar, IAS
  - Secretary – Padma Angmo, IIS
  - Secretary – K. Mehboob Ali Khan, IRS
    - Deputy Commissioner Changthang district – Nitish Rajoria
      - Chairman/Chief Executive Councillor, LAHDC Changthang –
    - Deputy Commissioner Drass district – Zahida Bano
      - Chairman/Chief Executive Councillor, LAHDC Drass –
    - Deputy Commissioner Kargil district – Rakesh Kumar
      - Chairman/Chief Executive Councillor, LAHDC Kargil –
    - Deputy Commissioner Leh district – Romil Singh Donk
      - Chairman/Chief Executive Councillor, LAHDC Leh –
    - Deputy Commissioner Nubra district – Mukul Beniwal
      - Chairman/Chief Executive Councillor, LAHDC Nubra –
    - Deputy Commissioner Sankoo district – Imteeaz Kacho
      - Chairman/Chief Executive Councillor, LAHDC Sankoo –
    - Deputy Commissioner Sham district – Kunzes Angmo
      - Chairman/Chief Executive Councillor, LAHDC Sham –
    - Deputy Commissioner Zanskar district – Omkar Rajendra Gundage
      - Chairman/Chief Executive Councillor, LAHDC Zanskar –

== See also ==
- Geography of Ladakh
- List of districts of Ladakh
- Tourism in Ladakh
