= Leh Assembly constituency =

Former constituency of the Jammu and Kashmir legislative assembly in India

Coordinates: 34.157°N 77.574°E

Leh
- Former constituency for the Jammu and Kashmir Legislative Assembly

Constituency details
- Country: India
- Region: North India
- State: Jammu and Kashmir
- District: Leh
- Established: 1962
- Abolished: 2019

Leh Assembly constituency was a constituency in the Jammu and Kashmir Legislative Assembly of Jammu and Kashmir a former northern state of India. It was part of Ladakh Lok Sabha constituency until its abolition.

== Members of the Legislative Assembly ==
| Year | Con. No. | Res. | Member | Party |
|---|---|---|---|---|
| 1962 | 74 | None | Kushak Bakula | Jammu & Kashmir National Conference |
| 1967 | 43 | None | S. Wangyal | Indian National Congress |
| 1972 | 43 | None | Sonam Wangyal | Indian National Congress |
| 1977 | 43 | None | Sonam Narboo | Indian National Congress |
| 1980^ | 43 | None | S. Angdoo | Independent |
| 1983 | 43 | None | Sonam Gyalsan | Indian National Congress |
| 1987 | 43 | None | Tsering Samphel | Indian National Congress |
| 1996 | 48 | None | Chering Dorjay | Indian National Congress |
| 2002 | 48 | None | Nawang Rigzin Jora | Independent |
| 2008 | 48 | None | Nawang Rigzin Jora | Indian National Congress |
| 2014 | 48 | None | Nawang Rigzin Jora | Indian National Congress |

^Bye-Election

== Election results ==
=== 2014 ===
2014 Jammu and Kashmir Legislative Assembly election : Leh
| Party | Candidate | Votes | % | ±% |
|---|---|---|---|---|
| INC | Nawang Rigzin Jora | 27,585 | 57.28 | |
| BJP | Chering Dorjay | 19,909 | 41.34 | |
| NOTA | None of the Above | 662 | 1.37 | |
| Margin of victory | | 7,676 | 16.16 | |
| Total valid votes | | 48,156 | 67.98 | |
| Rejected ballots | | 125 | | |
| Turnout | | 48,281 | 68.15 | |
| Registered electors | | 70,840 | | |
| INC hold | | Swing | | |

=== 2008 ===
2008 Jammu and Kashmir Legislative Assembly election : Leh
| Party | Candidate | Votes | % | ±% |
|---|---|---|---|---|
| INC | Nawang Rigzin Jora | 19,008 | 50.50 | |
| Independent | Thupstan Chhewang | 17,485 | 46.45 | |
| BSP | Ponchuk Tundup | 484 | 1.29 | |
| JKNPP | Mohd. Ramzan | 382 | 1.01 | |
| Jammu & Kashmir Peoples Democratic Party | Tashi Gyalson | 281 | 0.75 | |
| Margin of victory | | 1,523 | 4.05 | |
| Total valid votes | | 37,640 | 61.05 | |
| Rejected ballots | | 102 | | |
| Turnout | | 37,742 | | |
| Registered electors | | 61,659 | | |
| INC gain from Independent | | Swing | | |

=== 2002 ===
2002 Jammu and Kashmir Legislative Assembly election : Leh
| Party | Candidate | Votes | % | ±% |
|---|---|---|---|---|
| Independent | Nawang Rigzin Jora | Uncontested | | |
| Registered electors | | 74,471 | | |
| Independent gain from INC | | Swing | | |

=== 1996 ===
1996 Jammu and Kashmir Legislative Assembly election : Leh
| Party | Candidate | Votes | % | ±% |
|---|---|---|---|---|
| INC | Chering Dorjay | 16,712 | 51.52 | |
| JKNC | Sonam Wangchuk Narboo | 10,225 | 31.52 | |
| Independent | Tashi Rabstan | 3,024 | 9.32 | |
| BJP | Spalzes Angmo | 2,474 | 7.63 | |
| Margin of victory | | 6,487 | 20.00 | |
| Total valid votes | | 32,435 | | |
| Rejected ballots | | 449 | 1.37 | |
| Turnout | | 32,884 | 57.28 | |
| Registered electors | | 57,410 | | |
| INC hold | | Swing | | |

=== 1987 ===
1987 Jammu and Kashmir Legislative Assembly election : Leh
| Party | Candidate | Votes | % | ±% |
|---|---|---|---|---|
| INC | Tsering Samphel | 16,142 | 56.39 | |
| Independent | Tokdan Rinpochey | 7,138 | 24.94 | |
| Independent | Nurboo Gialchan | 3,528 | 12.33 | |
| Independent | Nasir Ali | 1,012 | 3.54 | |
| Independent | Lama Yangdol | 484 | 1.69 | |
| Independent | Lobzang Stanzin | 320 | 1.12 | |
| Margin of victory | | 9,004 | 31.46 | |
| Total valid votes | | 28,624 | | |
| Rejected ballots | | 1,034 | 3.49 | |
| Turnout | | 29,658 | 68.25 | |
| Registered electors | | 43,455 | | |
| INC hold | | Swing | | |

=== 1983 ===
1983 Jammu and Kashmir Legislative Assembly election : Leh
| Party | Candidate | Votes | % | ±% |
|---|---|---|---|---|
| INC | Sonam Gyalsan | 15,404 | 64.26 | |
| JKNC | Sonam Wangchuk Narboo | 8,287 | 34.57 | |
| Independent | Chhering Stobadan | 281 | 1.17 | |
| Margin of victory | | 7,117 | 29.69 | |
| Total valid votes | | 23,972 | | |
| Rejected ballots | | 1,370 | 5.41 | |
| Turnout | | 25,342 | 67.10 | |
| Registered electors | | 37,766 | | |
| INC gain from Independent | | Swing | | |

=== 1980 Bye-Election ===
1980 Jammu and Kashmir Legislative Assembly Bye-election : Leh
| Party | Candidate | Votes | % | ±% |
|---|---|---|---|---|
| Independent | S. Angdoo | 9,173 | | |
| INC(I) | T. Targais | 5,861 | | |
| JKNC | S. Ganbo | 4,072 | | |
| Margin of victory | | 3,312 | | |
| Total valid votes | | 19,106 | | |
| Rejected ballots | | | | |
| Turnout | | | | |
| Registered electors | | | | |
| Independent gain from INC | | Swing | | |

=== 1977 ===
1977 Jammu and Kashmir Legislative Assembly election : Leh
| Party | Candidate | Votes | % | ±% |
|---|---|---|---|---|
| INC | Sonam Narboo | 11,736 | 61.17 | |
| JP | Soham Gyaltsan | 7,450 | 38.83 | |
| Margin of victory | | 4,286 | 22.34 | |
| Total valid votes | | 19,186 | | |
| Rejected ballots | | 1,101 | 5.43 | |
| Turnout | | 20,287 | 64.79 | |
| Registered electors | | 31,310 | | |
| INC hold | | Swing | | |

=== 1972 ===
1972 Jammu and Kashmir Legislative Assembly election : Leh
| Party | Candidate | Votes | % | ±% |
|---|---|---|---|---|
| INC | Sonam Wangyal | 11,041 | 49.44 | |
| Independent | Koushok Tokdan | 10,670 | 47.78 | |
| Independent | Nurbo Gyilchan | 622 | 2.79 | |
| Margin of victory | | 371 | 1.66 | |
| Total valid votes | | 22,333 | | |
| Rejected ballots | | 67 | 0.30 | |
| Turnout | | 22,400 | 75.75 | |
| Registered electors | | 29,571 | | |
| INC hold | | Swing | | |

=== 1967 ===
1967 Jammu and Kashmir Legislative Assembly election : Leh
| Party | Candidate | Votes | % | ±% |
|---|---|---|---|---|
| INC | S. Wangyal | 16,270 | 81.69 | |
| Independent | N. C. Stanzin | 3,647 | 18.31 | |
| Margin of victory | | 12,623 | 63.38 | |
| Total valid votes | | 19,917 | | |
| Rejected ballots | | 15 | 0.08 | |
| Turnout | | 19,932 | 79.78 | |
| Registered electors | | 24,984 | | |
| INC gain from JKNC | | Swing | | |

=== 1962 ===
1962 Jammu and Kashmir Legislative Assembly election : Leh
| Party | Candidate | Votes | % | ±% |
|---|---|---|---|---|
| JKNC | Kushak Bakula | 20,095 | 97.30 | |
| Independent | Chering Punchok | 558 | 2.70 | |
| Margin of victory | | 19,537 | 94.60 | |
| Total valid votes | | 20,653 | | |
| Rejected ballots | | 46 | 0.22 | |
| Turnout | | 20,699 | 90.22 | |
| Registered electors | | 22,944 | | |
| JKNC win (new seat) | | | | |

== See also ==
- Leh
- Leh district
