= Outline of Ladakh =

Overview of and topical guide to Ladakh

Location of Ladakh

Banner of Ladakh

The following outline is provided as an overview of and topical guide to Ladakh:

Ladakh – is a region administered by India as a union territory. Until 2019, it was under the jurisdiction of Jammu and Kashmir. Its location is covered by the Himalayan and Karakoram mountains.

== General reference ==
=== Names ===
- Common English name: Ladakh
- Official English name(s): Union territory of Ladakh
- Adjectivals
  - Ladakhi
- Demonyms
  - Ladakhis

== Geography of Ladakh ==
Geography of Ladakh

- Ladakh is: a region administered by India as a union territory
- Atlas of Ladakh

=== Location of Ladakh ===
- Ladakh is situated in the north of India
- Time zone: Indian Standard Time (UTC+05:30)

=== Districts of Ladakh ===
- Kargil
- Leh

== Administration and politics of Ladakh ==
- Politics of Ladakh
- Form of government: Autonomous administration under India
- Head of state: Lieutenant Governor of Ladakh
- Capital of Ladakh:
  - Kargil
  - Leh
- Ladakh Police
- Jammu and Kashmir High Court

=== Autonomous administration in Ladakh ===
- Ladakh Autonomous Hill Development Council, Kargil
- Ladakh Autonomous Hill Development Council, Leh

== History and culture of Ladakh ==
- History of Ladakh
  - Maryul
  - Namgyal dynasty of Ladakh
  - Tibet–Ladakh–Mughal War
  - Treaty of Tingmosgang
  - Dogra–Tibetan War
  - Indo-Pakistani War of 1947–1948
  - Military operations in Ladakh (1948)
  - Battle of Turtuk
  - 2010 Ladakh floods
- Culture of Kashmir
- Music of Jammu and Kashmir and Ladakh

=== Religion in Ladakh ===
- Islam in Kashmir
- Buddhism in Kashmir

== Economy and infrastructure of Ladakh ==
- Tourism in Ladakh

== Education in Ladakh ==
- Central Institute of Buddhist Studies
- University of Ladakh
