= Politics of Ladakh =

Political system of Indian-administered territory of Ladakh

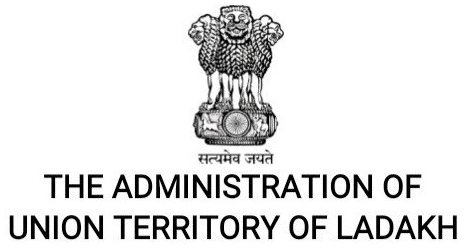
- Emblem of Ladakh
- Polity type: Union territory of India
- Constitution: Constitution of India

Executive branch
- Head of state
- Title: Lieutenant Governor
- Currently: Vinai Kumar Saxena
- Appointer: President of India

Judicial branch
- Name: High Court of Jammu & Kashmir and Ladakh
- Chief judge: N. Kotiswar Singh

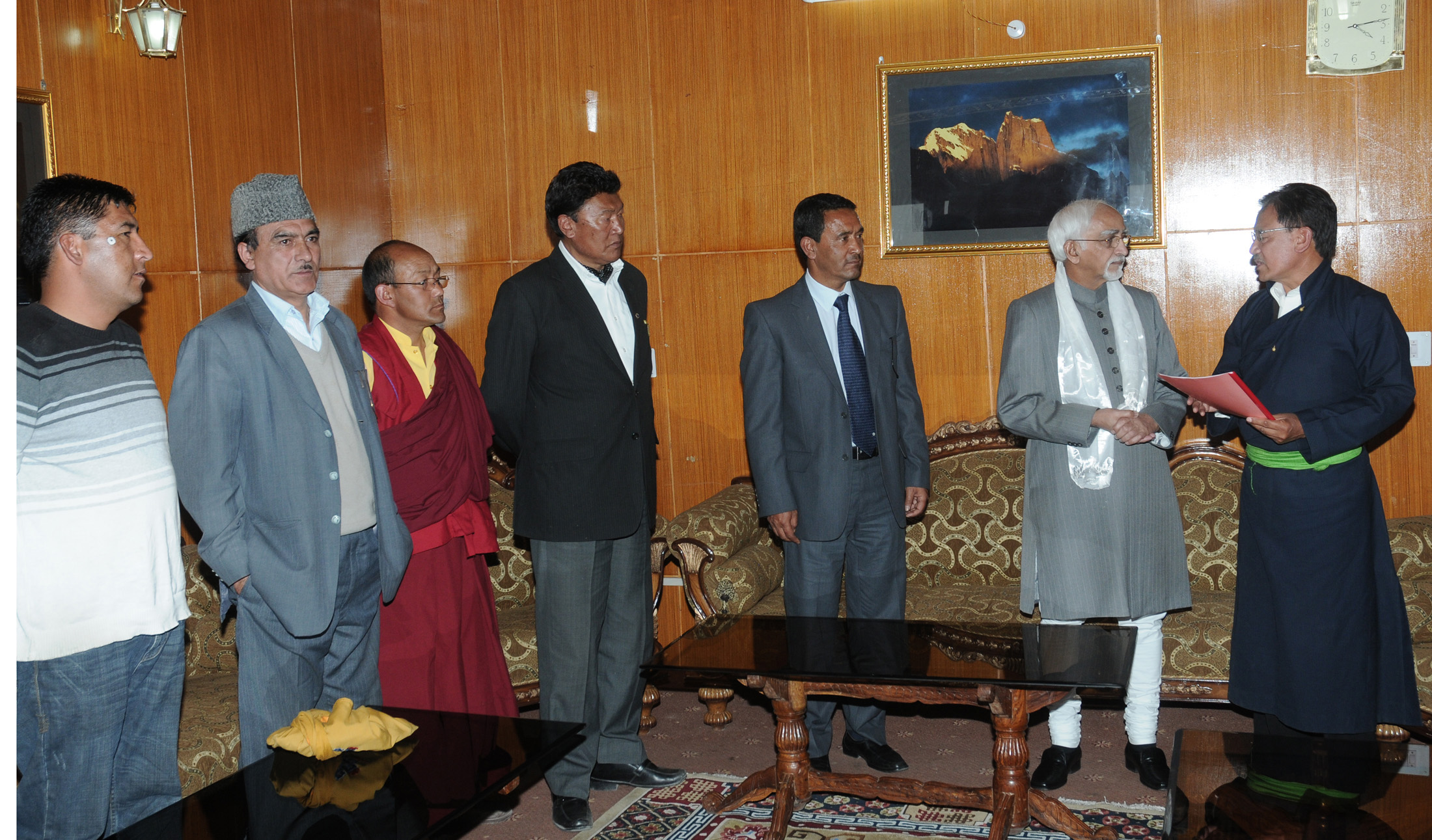
Ladakhi politicians of LAHDC and LUTF with former Vice President of India Mohammad Hamid Ansari

Politics of Ladakh is exercised within democratic setup of the Indian-administered union territory of Ladakh. Major power centres are Ladakh Autonomous Hill Development Council, Leh and Ladakh Autonomous Hill Development Council, Kargil alongside Ladakh Lok Sabha constituency. Indian National Congress and Bharatiya Janata Party are major political parties. Ladakhi religious organisations like Ladakh Buddhist Association, Imam Khomeni Memorial Trust and Anjuman-e-Jamiat-ul-Ulama Asna Asharia have major influences as well.

== History ==
Map of the Indian-administered union territory of Ladakh

After collapse of Namgyal dynasty of Ladakh, Ladakh became part of the princely state of Jammu and Kashmir before the Dogra–Tibetan War. After 1947, Ladakh continued to be part of Indian state of Jammu and Kashmir. Ladakh Union Territory Front was formed demanding Ladakh to be formed separate Union territory. Ladakh was created as separate union territory in 2019 with celebrations in Leh.

== Political parties of Ladakh ==
Major political parties are:

- Indian National Congress (Congress)
- Bharatiya Janata Party (BJP)
- National Conference (NC)
- Bahujan Samaj Party (BSP)
- Aam Aadmi Party (AAP)

== See also ==
- Politics of India
- Politics of Jammu and Kashmir
- Politics of Himachal Pradesh
- Administration of Ladakh
- Ladakh Police
