= Chering Dorjay =

Indian politician

Minister for Ladakh Affairs and Cooperatives, Government of Jammu and Kashmir
- In office March 2015 – June 2018

Personal details
- Born: 24 December 1948 (age 77) Leh

Chering Dorjay is an Indian politician and was a member of the Bharatiya Janata Party. Dorjay was a member of the Jammu and Kashmir Legislative Council from the Assembly (Ladakh). He was Minister for Cooperatives and Ladakh Affairs in Jammu and Kashmir till 19 June 2018.

== Early life ==
Dorjay was born on 24 December 1948 at Lakrook house Sankar in Leh. His father Tashi Namgyal was a progressive farmer who did remarkable job in producing various kinds of vegetables in Leh. Chering Dorjay received his primary education at Disket Nubra and middle education at Middle School Leh. He passed matriculation from Govt. High School Leh in 1965, under the J&K Board of School Education, Srinagar.

Later, he proceeded to Srinagar, enrolled in S.P. College, Srinagar for higher education and qualified for graduation in 1970.

After graduation, he joined State Bank of India in Leh branch and worked there for about six years, resigned from the post in 1976, and worked for a Swiss travel agency and travelled to many foreign countries, in connection with the business. He was an active youth leader and took part in the Scheduled Tribe Movement in 1982.

== Indian National Congress ==
He had been President Youth Congress District Leh for about six years, from 1983 to 1987, and did remarkable job to make the people aware of their rights. Besides, he had been vice-president of Ladakh Buddhist Association from 1988 to 1995 and was an active member in 1989.

Buddhist agitation, against the indifferent attitude of the Kashmir Govt. and to fulfil the long-standing demands of the Ladakhi Buddhists, he worked sincerely for the cause of the Buddhist community and to create awareness in the field of social, political, economic, cultural and education.

He participated as a member of the LBA delegation to Srinagar, Jammu and Delhi, headed by Thupstan Chewang. He participated as a member of the LBA delegation in the tripartite talk, from 1989 to 1995, in connection with the grant of Hill Development Status for Ladakh.

In the said talk, the State and central leadership asked to remove the differences with the Muslims of Leh and to create harmonious relation between different communities in the region. Government said "Unless or until the Muslims would not cooperate the movement, the Govt. could not give any kind of assurance of your demands".

Thus on 29 November 1992 during the tripartite talk in New Delhi, the LBA lifted the three years old social and economic boycott. And the Muslims of Leh, under the leadership of Mohammad Akbar Ladakhi wholeheartedly participated in the struggle of greater autonomy, popularly known as Hill Development Status for Ladakh

The second tripartite talk was held in New Delhi in October 1993. In the said meeting the Home Minister of India S.B. Chavan formally announced that the demand of "Autonomous Hill Development Council" would be soon considered.

Finally on 9 May 1995 President of India approved the Council Act and after the election of the 26 councillors, the swearing ceremony for the first Ladakh Autonomous Hill Development Council was held at Polo ground Leh, on 3 September 1995 and Thupstan Chewang was elected the first chairman and chief executive councillor of the LAHDC Leh.

In September 1995, Dorjay was elected councillor from the upper Leh constituency but resigned in 1996 due to offer of MLA election from Pradesh Congress Committee J&K, and won the election by defeating his nearest rival by a good margin. He represented the people of Leh in the J&K Assembly from 1996 to 2002 and did remarkable job for the welfare of the people of Ladakh.

As a Member of J&K Legislative Assembly, he had been the Secretary of the J&K Congress Legislature Party and remained Member of the consultative committee for Planning, Power Development and Ladakh Affairs, and served the people of J&K in a very efficient manner.

The most important LAHDC Act, had to be rectified within one year, after the popular government came in power. The resolution was handed over to a selected committee and ultimately the bill was passed.

Secondly, the Jammu & Kashmir National Conference submitted the Autonomy resolution in the house, the Congress and other like-minded members opposed and showed resentment against the Autonomy resolution and it could not be passed. He had been an active member of the Action Committee on ST and worked whole-heartedly to achieve the goal under the leadership of Rev. Bakula Rinpoche.

== Ladakh Union Territory Front ==
Dorjay was elected president Ladakh Union Territory Front in 2002 and worked on the post till he was sworn in as chairman and chief executive councillor of LAHDC Leh after the landslide victory to his party in the council election in 2005.

As chief executive councillor, he participated in many seminars at national and international level and presented his papers on social, political, cultural, educational and economical scenario of Ladakh.

== Bharatiya Janata Party ==
Dorjay was elected president Bharatiya Janata Party Leh in 2013 to 2015, and he was elected as member, Jammu and Kashmir Legislative Council from Leh (Kashmir Province) in March, 2015.

Later Dorjay was inducted as Minister of State in the PDP-BJP Coalition Government with independent charge of Cooperatives and Minister of State, Ladakh Affairs, J&K. Later he was inducted as Cabinet Minister and allocated with prestigious portfolio, Ladakh Affairs and Cooperatives Department.

Dorjay is a man of dedication and devotion with the qualities of straightness-forwardness, honesty, agility and ethical values. He is having least interest for personal benefit.

Doejay resigned from the post of President of BJP Ladhak on 3 May 2020 and also from the primary membership of party.
