= Kargil Democratic Alliance =

Political Party in Ladakh, India

- Abbreviation: KDA
- Co-Chairs: Asgar Ali Karbalai; Vacant
- Founded: 2020
- Headquarters: Kargil, Ladakh, India
- Ideology: Regionalism; Autonomy; Secularism

Kargil Democratic Alliance (KDA) is a political and social coalition based in the Kargil district of the Union Territory of Ladakh, India. It was formed in 2020 following the reorganization of the former state of Jammu and Kashmir and the abrogation of Article 370. The alliance brings together political parties, religious organizations, and civil society groups from Kargil to collectively advocate for constitutional safeguards, political representation, and protection of local interests in Ladakh.

== History ==
The Kargil Democratic Alliance was formed in 2020 after the reorganization of Jammu and Kashmir into two Union Territories Jammu and Kashmir and Ladakh, in August 2019. The transition to Union Territory status without a legislative assembly led to concerns in Ladakh regarding political representation, land rights, employment opportunities, and cultural preservation.

In response, political leaders, religious organizations, and civil society groups in Kargil established the KDA as a common platform to coordinate their demands. The alliance has since worked in coordination with the Leh Apex Body (LAB), a similar grouping based in Leh district, on shared regional issues.

== Composition ==
Rather than a formal membership structure, the alliance operates as a joint platform representing multiple stakeholders in the region.

=== Leadership ===
The alliance is led by senior political leaders from Kargil, including:

- Qamar Ali Akhoon – Co-chair; senior leader of the Jammu and Kashmir National Conference (Passed away in February 2026)
- Asgar Ali Karbalai – Co-chair; senior leader of the Indian National Congress

=== Core representatives ===
Representatives of the KDA in official dialogues and delegations have included:

- Qamar Ali Akhoon
- Asgar Ali Karbalai
- Sajjad Hussain Kargili

=== Constituent organisations ===
The alliance includes participation from a range of organizations in Kargil mentioned by organizations along with representee:

- Jammu and Kashmir National Conference, Haji Hanifa Jan is the District President of National Conference also serving as Joint Secretary of the alliance
- District Congress Committee (INC), Nasir Hussain Munshi (President) also serving as the alliance’s Secretary
- Ladakh Autonomous Hill Development Council, Kargil, Mubarak Shah
- Imam Khomeini Memorial Trust, Sheikh Bashir Shakir (Vice Chairman)
- Anjuman-e-Sahib-uz-Zaman, Agha Syed Ahmad Rizvi (Vice Chairman)
- Jamiat-e-Ulama Isna Asharia, Sajjad Hussain Kargili
- Anjuman-e-Ahle Sunnat Wal Jamaat, Shah Nawaz Gawar
- Noorbakhshia community, Agha Syed Mohammad Shah
- Student Educational Movement of Kargil, Murtaza Ali

== Demands ==
The KDA has raised several demands relating to governance and constitutional protections in Ladakh, including:

- Grant of full statehood to Ladakh, establishment of an elected legislative assembly.
- Inclusion of Ladakh under the Sixth Schedule to safeguard land, employment, and cultural identity.
- Reservation in government employment and protection of domicile rights for local residents.
- Judicial inquiry into alleged administrative and security-related incidents in the Union Territory.

== Recent developments ==
In 2025, representatives of the KDA and the Leh Apex Body suspended talks with the Ministry of Home Affairs, citing dissatisfaction with the response to their demands. The groups have continued to organize protests and engage in dialogue efforts concerning governance and constitutional safeguards for Ladakh. Talks were resumed by the home ministry on October 22 2025.

== See also ==
- Leh Apex Body
- Ladakh
- Ladakh protests
- Politics of Ladakh
- Ladakh Autonomous Hill Development Council, Kargil
- Calls for autonomy in Jammu and Kashmir and Ladakh
