= Zakiri =

Zakiri is a surname. Notable people with the surname include:

- Khairul Imam Zakiri (born 2001), Malaysian footballer
- Sheikh Hussain Zakiri (c. 1940–2016), Indian Islamic scholar
