= Ladakh protests =

Ongoing protests in Ladakh, India

- Date: 2021–ongoing
- Location: Ladakh, India
- Caused by: Reorganisation act reconstituting Ladakh as a union territory; Loss of administrative autonomy; Unemployment
- Goals: Statehood to Ladakh; Inclusion of Ladakh in Sixth Schedule; Formation of the Ladakh Public Service Commission; Two parliamentary seats for Ladakh; Job reservation for locals
- Methods: Talks; Hunger strike and fasts; Demonstrations; Student activism; Protests and marches; Arson

Parties
Ladakh: Leh Apex Body (LAB); Kargil Democratic Alliance (KDA)	Government of India: Ministry of Home Affairs; High-Powered Committee on Ladakh

Casualties
- Deaths: 4
- Injuries: 87

Demonstrations in Ladakh, India, has been ongoing since 2021, with protesters demanding constitutional safeguards for Ladakh in the form of statehood and inclusion in the Sixth Schedule of the Indian Constitution. The local representative groups and the committee of the Government of India held several rounds of talks but they had been inconclusive. The demonstrations, protests and fasts were held several times between 2023 and 2026. The protests turned violent in September 2025.

== Background ==
Ladakh is a high-altitude desert region with a population of 300,000 people, that borders both Pakistan and China. Around 47% of Ladakh's residents are Muslim, while Buddhists make up 40% of the population. Hindus form around 12%. India maintains a heavy troop presence in Ladakh, which includes disputed border regions with China.

In August 2019 Jammu and Kashmir Reorganisation Act was passed by the Parliament of India which contained provisions to reconstitute Ladakh as a union territory without legislature, separate from the rest of Jammu and Kashmir on 31 October 2019, following the abrogation of Article 370. Under the terms of the act, the union territory is administered by a Lieutenant Governor acting on behalf of the union Government of India and does not have an elected legislative assembly or chief minister. Each district within the union territory continues to elect an autonomous district council as done previously. According to Al Jazeera, after the reorganisation, the autonomous district councils lost much of their administrative powers. (Note: It is hard to find direct evidence for this claim. But it appears that the Union Territory administration, being more influential, is able to override the autonomous district councils, and the government officials take it more seriously than the latter.)

The Leh Apex Body (LAB) and the Kargil Democratic Alliance (KDA), both being the mix of socio-political and religious groups from Leh and Kargil respectively, had organised the agitation since 2021 for various demands including the statehood to Ladakh, the inclusion of Ladakh in Sixth Schedule, the formation of the Ladakh Public Service Commission, and two parliamentary seats for Ladakh. Other demands are concerned with local identity and culture, local languages, environmental issues and employment.

During 2020 Hill Council elections, the Bharatiya Janata Party (BJP) had promised the inclusion of Ladakh in Sixth Schedule. The Central Government has been led by the BJP since 2014.

== Protests and talks ==
=== 2021—22 ===
The LAB and KDA were formed and they joined hands to represent their demands. In December 2021, the shutdown was observed across Ladakh. The Central Government promised the talks but none held for months. The LAB and KDA held protests in Leh and Kargil in November 2022.

=== 2023 ===
In January 2023, activist Sonam Wangchuck held a five-day fast in subzero temperatures to highlight the environmental impacts by proposed mining and industrial plans. The LAB and KDA held the protests together in January. They also held protests in Delhi in February.

The High-Powered Committee (HPC) on Ladakh under the Ministry of Home Affairs of the Central Government was formed in January 2023 to hold the talks. Several rounds of the talks were held between the HPC and the representatives of the LAB and the KDA.

=== 2024 ===
On 3 February and 6 March 2024, hundreds of people led by LAB and KDA demonstrated in Leh. Wangchuck held a 21-day fast unto death in March. By March 2024, nine rounds of the talks had remained inconclusive.

More than 100 people from Ladakh associated with LAB and KDA including Wangchuck started a 1000-km march to Delhi in from 1 September 2024 for highlighting the environmental issues and constitutional demands. Near the border of Delhi, they were detained by the Delhi Police on 1 October 2024 for violating the assembly prohibitions under Section 163 of the BNSS.

=== 2025 ===
The talks were held in March and May 2025. The Central Government accepted and notified draft rules: 85% reservation for locals, requirement of 15-year residency for domicile status, 33% reservation for women in hill councils, and recognition of five official languages.

On 10 September 2025, the LAB initiated a 35-day hunger strike in support of the demands. Total 15 people started the fast. Wangchuck also went on the hunger strike. On 20 September, the next round of talks between HPC and LAB as well as KDA were scheduled for 6 October in New Delhi. Wangchuck rejected the talks, calling them "unilateral" and delayed, and demanded "result-oriented" negotiations at the earliest.

Two people of the 15 people on hunger strike were hospitalized on 23 September after their health deteriorated. So the youth wing of the LAB called for the shutdown and protest on 24 September 2025 in Leh. The protest turned violent and the protesters pelted stones, arsoned, clashed with the police and burned down the BJP office in Leh. The police fired teargas shells and carried out baton charge to disperse the protesters. At least 4 people were killed and about 50 were injured including 30 police personnel when "police had to resort to firing". The curfew was imposed under Section 163 of the BNSS in Leh and the ongoing Ladakh festival was cancelled. Following violence, Wangchuk ended his 15-day fasts and appealed for peace.

The KDA called for a shutdown on 25 September in the support. The curfew in Leh, Kargil and other major parts of Ladakh continued from 25 September. All educational institutes were closed in Leh. Internet services were shut down. On 26 September, Wangchuk was detained under National Security Act and lodged in Jodhpur Central Jail. More than 60 people including 2 councillors were arrested. The LAB pulled out of informal talk on 30 September as well as formal 6 October talks with the Central Government citing the negative campaign against their agitation, demand for investigation in deaths and release of their arrested leaders. Next day, the KDA also pulled out of talks too. Both groups resumed talks with the central government on 22 October which included the judicial inquiry in the 24 September violence. The curfew was lifted in Leh as well as Kargil after three weeks but were imposed again from 17 to 24 October.

=== 2026 ===
The talks with Central Government on 4 February remained inconclusive. Wangchuk was released on 14 March, after 170 days of detention. Other activists remained in the detention. The protest rallies were organised and shutdown was called for by the LAB and the KDA on 16 March. Amit Shah, the Minister of Home Affairs, visited Ladakh on 30 April and 1 May and met Ladakhi leaders. The talks with the Central Government was held again on 22 May and 9 September.
