= Parvati Devi (Ladakh politician) =

Indian titular Queen mother of Ladakh and politician (1934–2024)

Member of Parliament, Lok Sabha
- In office 1977–1980
- Preceded by: Kushok Bakula
- Succeeded by: P. Namgyal
- Constituency: Ladakh

Personal details
- Born: Deskit Wangmo; 1 May 1934 Khangsar, Lahaul and Spiti, Himachal Pradesh
- Died: 5 November 2024 (aged 90) Stok, Ladakh
- Party: Indian National Congress
- Spouse: Kunzang Namgyal
- Children: 4

Gyalmo Parvati Devi Deskit Wangmo (1 May 1934 – 5 November 2024), also known as Rani Parvati Devi, was an Indian royal and politician who was the Queen mother of Ladakh. She served as a member of the 6th Lok Sabha from 1977 to 1980.

== Early life ==
Parvati was born on 1 May 1934 to Nyima Wangyal at the Khangsar Palace into the royal family of Khangsar in Lahaul, presently part of Lahaul and Spiti district of Himachal Pradesh. She received education up to fifth standard.

== Career ==
Parvati Devi was known for her social work in Ladakh. In 1958 she became the Convener of Welfare Extension Project, Leh's Implementing Committee.

For the 1977 Indian general election, the Indian National Congress (INC) made Devi its candidate for Ladakh constituency and its local coalition partner Jammu & Kashmir National Conference supported her. Only an independent candidate stood against her and she defeated him by a margin of 2,877 votes (polling 23,130 against his 20,253) to become the first woman MP from Ladakh. Devi and Begum Akbar Jehan Abdullah were the only Jammu & Kashmir women to win the 1977 election. The house couldn't complete its term of five years and in 1980 another election was held. This time National Conference fielded its candidate from Ladakh.

She was the founder and president of Namgyal Institute of Research on Ladakhi Art and Culture (NIRLAC).

== Personal life and death ==
Parvati married the titular king of Ladakh, Kunzang Namgyal on 10 July 1950, who turned out to be an alcoholic and died at the age of 48, leaving behind Devi and their four children (two sons and two daughters). As per local traditions she was supposed to marry the deceased king's brother. Instead she excluded her brother-in-law from the family and arranged a monthly allowance for him. He took the matter to the court and eventually, in an out-of-court settlement, gained possession of a part of the family property.

She resided at the Stok Palace. During winters, she used to sojourn in Manali.

Parvati died on 5 November 2024, at the age of 90.
