= P. Namgyal =

Indian politician, agriculturist, and social worker (1937–2020)

Member of Parliament, Lok Sabha
- In office 1980–1989
- Preceded by: Parvati Devi
- Succeeded by: Mohamad Hassan Commander
- Constituency: Ladakh
- In office 1996–1998
- Preceded by: Mohamad Hassan Commander
- Succeeded by: Syed Hussain
- Constituency: Ladakh

Personal details
- Born: 17 December 1937 Ladakh, Jammu and Kashmir (state)
- Died: 1 June 2020 (aged 82) Vill. Sumur in Distt. Ladakh, Ladakh (union territory)
- Cause of death: COVID-19
- Party: Indian National Congress
- Spouse: Tsewang Dolma

Phuntsog Namgyal (17 December 1937 - 1 June 2020) was an Indian politician, agriculturist and social worker.

He served as Member- of Parliament for Ladakh from 1980 till 1989 and also from 1996 to 1998.

He also served the Pradesh Congress Committee in the erstwhile Jammu and Kashmir (state) as secretary-general and vice president.

He died on 1 June 2020 from COVID-19, during the COVID-19 pandemic in India, at the age of 83
