= Mohmad Haneefa =

Indian politician (born 1969)

Haji Mohmad Haneefa Jan
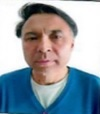

Member of Parliament, Lok Sabha
- Incumbent
- Assumed office 4 June 2024
- Preceded by: Jamyang Tsering Namgyal
- Constituency: Ladakh

Personal details
- Born: 2 January 1969 (age 57) Kargil, Jammu & Kashmir, India (present day Ladakh)
- Party: Independent
- Other political affiliations: JKNC
- Spouse: Rehana Bano

Mohmad Haneefa Jan (born 2 January 1969) is an Indian politician from Kargil serving as a member of the Lok Sabha representing the only constituency of the union territory of Ladakh.

== Political career ==
In the 2023 Kargil election, Haneefa in JKNC ticket ran against Khadim Hussain from INC for the Barro constituency in the LAHDC Kargil, in which he lost by 66 votes. In the 2024 general election, Haneefa ran for the Ladakh constituency as an independent. He won that seat and was elected to the 18th Lok Sabha, having defeated two other candidates Tsering Namgyal and Tashi Gyalson. Haji Mohmad Haneefa got (Independent) 65,259 votes whereas Tsering Namgyal got 37,397 and Tashi Gyalson got 31,956 votes who represented the INC and the BJP respectively.
