= Jamyang Tsering Namgyal =

Indian politician (born 1985)

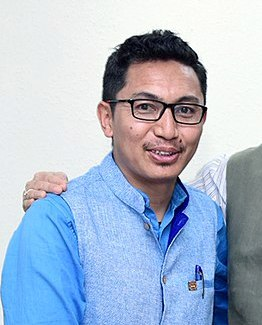
- Namgyal in 2020

1st President of Bharatiya Janata Party, Ladakh
- In office 20 July 2020 – 9 January 2022
- Preceded by: office established
- Succeeded by: Phunchok Stanzin

Member of Parliament, Lok Sabha
- In office 23 May 2019 – 4 June 2024
- Preceded by: Thupstan Chhewang
- Succeeded by: Mohmad Haneefa
- Constituency: Ladakh

Chief Executive Councillor of LAHDC, Leh
- In office 9 November 2018 – 2019
- Preceded by: Dorjey Motup
- Succeeded by: Gyal P. Wangyal

Councillor of Ladakh Autonomous Hill Development Council, Leh
- In office 2015 – 2019
- Succeeded by: Stanzin Chospel
- Constituency: Martselang

Personal details
- Born: 4 August 1985 (age 41) Matho, Ladakh
- Party: Bharatiya Janata Party
- Spouse: Sonam Wangmo
- Education: Bachelor of Arts, Master in English Literature, Ph.D. in English Literature
- Alma mater: University of Jammu
- Profession: Politician

Jamyang Tsering Namgyal (born 4 August 1985), also known by his initials JTN, is an Indian politician who served as a Member of Parliament in Lok Sabha for Ladakh, India's largest parliamentary seat geographically. Namgyal was elected, on 9 November 2018, to be the youngest and 8th Chief Executive Councillor (CEC) of Ladakh Autonomous Hill Development Council, Leh. He belongs to the Bharatiya Janata Party (BJP).

== Early life ==
Jamyang Tsering Namgyal, popularly known to people as JTN, was born in Matho village in the Leh District of Jammu and Kashmir, India (present day in Ladakh, India) on 4 August 1985 to Stanzin Dorjey and Ishey Putit. He passed his 12th examinations from Central Institute of Buddhist Studies, Leh. Later he completed his graduation from University of Jammu and he completed his post graduation in MA in English Literature from Indra Gandhi National Open University. He practices Buddhism.

== Political career ==
Prior to joining politics, he served All Ladakh Student Association, Jammu, in various capacities and as President from 2011 to 2012. After joining politics as member of BJP, Leh, he served as Private Secretary to the Member of Parliament from Ladakh Thupstan Chhewang. He contested the election of Ladakh Autonomous Hill Development Council, Leh in 2015 from Martselang Constituency. He won with record margin to be elected as Councillor in Ladakh Autonomous Hill Development Council, Leh. Later after the resignation of Dorjay Motup from the post of Chief Executive Councillor, Jamyang Tsering Namgyal was elected as 8th Chief Executive Councillor to the Ladakh Autonomous Hill Development Council, Leh.

BJP had fielded JTN from Ladakh parliamentary constituency on 29 March 2019 in the 2019 Elections to the Lok Sabha or House of the People of Indian Parliament, the voting for which took place on 6 May 2019 and the counting was on 23 May 2019. He was elected into the 17th Lok Sabha, representing Ladakh constituency.

In the Lok Sabha, he lent his support to the bill ensuring re-designation of Ladakh as a Union Territory of India, and the revocation of special status lent to Jammu and Kashmir by a presidential order. For this, he was praised by the BJP leader and prime minister Narendra Modi.

== Published works ==
- Authored and published a poetry book "༄། །སྙན་ངག་གི་ལེགས་སྐྱེས།། A Gift of Poetry" in 2013
- Authored an article "Divisional Status for Ladakh- Its Implication" published on 11 March 2014 by Daily Excelsior
- Authored article "Inclusion of Bhoti Language in the Eight Schedule of Indian Constitution" published by Himalayan Cultural Heritage Foundation as its main story of the year 2012
