= Sindhu Central University =

Central university in Khaltse, Ladakh, India

- Motto: Vidya Sarvatra Prakashtey (Sanskrit)
- Type: Central University
- Established: 2021; 5 years ago
- Affiliations: AIU; UGC
- Chancellor: Lieutenant Governor of Ladakh
- Vice-Chancellor: Rajeev Rattan Sharma
- Visitor: President of India
- Location: Khaltse, Ladakh, India; 34°19′25″N 76°53′04″E
- Website: https://sindhucu.ac.in/

Sindhu Central University is a central university located in Khaltse, Ladakh. It was established by the Central Universities (Amendment) Act 2021 under Ministry of Education. The permanent campus of the University is proposed to be constructed in Gothang at village Khaltse, Leh, Ladakh covering approx 110 Acres (884 Kanals and 05 Marles) under Khasra no. 1870.

The university offers three postgraduate level degree courses: M.Tech in Atmospheric & Climate Science, M. Tech in Energy Technology & Policy, and M.A. in Public Policy.

== History ==
In July 2021, the Union Council of Ministers approved the setting up of the new university for ₹750 crore. Later on EdCIL (India) Limited prepared the detailed project report and estimated the budget around ₹910.26 crore. The Bill was passed by the parliament in August 2021. And the university was established under the Central Universities (Amendment) Act, 2021.

The first meeting of the Executive Council was held in May 2023. The university commenced operations in the academic year 2023–24.

== Campus ==
Sindhu Central University's campus is in Khaltse, ladakh, A village between Leh and Kargil city.

== Academics and programs ==
The university offers 3 post-graduate programs: M.Tech in Atmospheric & Climate Sciences, M. Tech in Energy Technology & Policy, and M.A in Public Policy.
