= Khalatse =

Town in Union Territory of Ladakh

Khalatse Khaltse, Khalsi
- Village
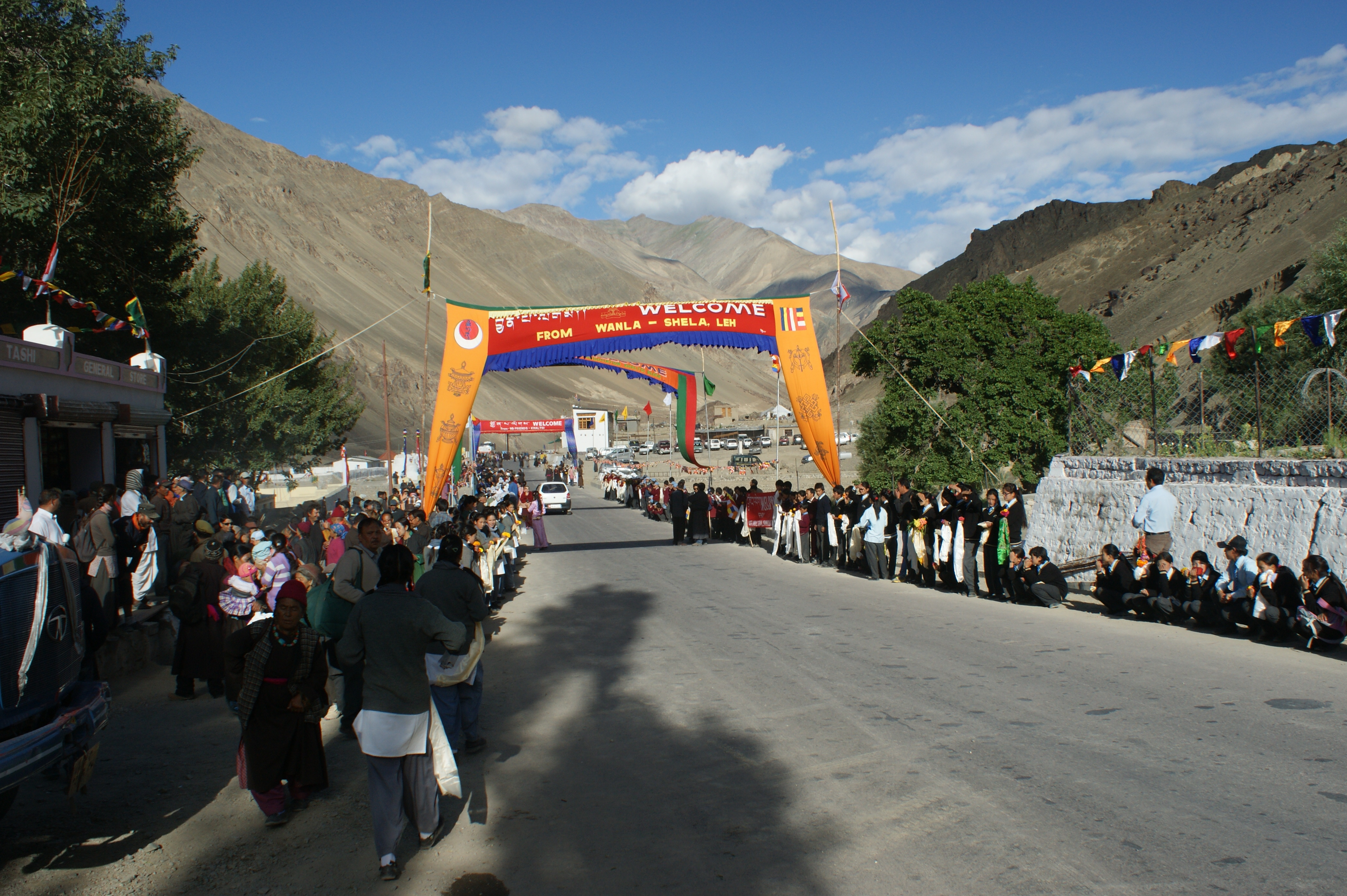
- School children in Khalatse

- Location within Ladakh Location within India
- Coordinates: 34.3200775°N 76.8793025°E
- Country: India
- Union Territory: Ladakh
- District: Sham
- Tehsil: Khalatse
- Sub-Divisional Magistrate: Suhail Ahmad

Government
  - Type: Autonomous Hill Development Council
  - Body: LAHDC, Sham
- Elevation: 2,987 m (9,800 ft)

Population (2011)
  - Total: 767
- Time zone: UTC+5:30 (IST)
- 2011 census code: 948

Khalatse (Wylie: mkhar la rtse, THL: khar la tsé), often written as Khaltse , Khaltsi or Khalsi, is the headquarters of the eponymous subdivision, block and tehsil in the Sham district of Ladakh, India. It is located 95 km from Leh city on the old main road to Kargil, where it crosses the Indus over an iron bridge. Much of its importance is because it is the place where the road from Kashmir debouches into the Indus Valley.

Close by are the remains of an old fortified customs house. Khaltsi is also the location of the Sindhu Central University in Ladakh.

== History ==
Bridge at Khalatse. Photo taken first half of 20th century.

A fragmentary inscription at Khalatse carries the name 'Maharaja Uvima' which is attributed to the Kushan king, Vima Kadphises, who ruled in the 1st or early 2nd century CE.

Lhachen Naglug (c. 1150-1175 CE), the king of Ladakh (then known as the Maryul kingdom), built a bridge across the Indus at the same site as the present bridge, and the Bragnag castle on the bank of the Indus, on the brook, about one mile (1.6 km) above the present village, to guard the bridge. It was built in competition with another bridge, the Babu Khar bridge, only three miles (4.8 km) away, and was clearly built to raise taxes from travellers. The castle is said to have been the first castle built in the country. The ruins of the castle and also the remains of extensive fields and watercourses are still visible. Lha chen Naglug also built the palace at Wanla.

There are a number of ancient Dardic rock carvings nearby, including one of a Dard woman carrying a basket on her back, one of a man hunting antelopes, and some showing men with what appear to be flat hats, all costumes similar to the Dards of Da. In front of the ancient Dard castle at Khalatse is an inscription in an Indian language which probably dates from the period of Dard occupation.

The German Moravian Church Mission, which opened in Leh in 1885 had a sub-station in Khalatse which remained open for the half a century prior to India's independence in 1947 and played a prominent role there with their medical and educational activities, but only made a few converts.

At a cost of 750 crores, Khaltsi has been chosen as the location of the upcoming Central University in Ladakh. Its location was strategically chosen, being between the capitals of Kargil and Leh.

Khalatse is also famous for its apricots.

== Demographics ==
Entering Khaltse by road from Srinagar, it is clear one is entering the heartland of Buddhism with its chortens or small stupas, mani stones and prayer flags. Upstream from Khalatse, and downstream on the right bank of the Indus, the people are almost all Buddhist. The ones downstream are mostly Brokpa or Dards.

According to the 2011 census of India, Khaltse has 156 households. The effective literacy rate (i.e. the literacy rate of population excluding children aged 6 and below) is 86.27%.

Demographics (2011 Census)
	Total	Male	Female
Population	767	381	386
Children aged below 6 years	68	36	32
Scheduled caste	0	0	0
Scheduled tribe	751	366	385
Literates	603	324	279
Workers (all)	381	202	179
Main workers (total)	378	202	176
Main workers: Cultivators	42	22	20
Main workers: Agricultural labourers	3	1	2
Main workers: Household industry workers	1	0	1
Main workers: Other	332	179	153
Marginal workers (total)	3	0	3
Marginal workers: Cultivators	0	0	0
Marginal workers: Agricultural labourers	0	0	0
Marginal workers: Household industry workers	2	0	2
Marginal workers: Others	1	0	1
Non-workers	386	179	207

== Climate ==
Climate data for Khalatse
Month	Jan	Feb	Mar	Apr	May	Jun	Jul	Aug	Sep	Oct	Nov	Dec	Year
Mean daily maximum °C (°F)	−3.5 (25.7)	−0.3 (31.5)	5.3 (41.5)	12.9 (55.2)	19.3 (66.7)	23.5 (74.3)	26.7 (80.1)	26.2 (79.2)	22.4 (72.3)	16.0 (60.8)	8.9 (48.0)	1.1 (34.0)	13.2 (55.8)
Daily mean °C (°F)	−8.2 (17.2)	−5.7 (21.7)	0.2 (32.4)	7.3 (45.1)	13.0 (55.4)	17.0 (62.6)	20.4 (68.7)	19.9 (67.8)	15.8 (60.4)	9.3 (48.7)	2.8 (37.0)	−3.9 (25.0)	7.3 (45.2)
Mean daily minimum °C (°F)	−12.9 (8.8)	−11.1 (12.0)	−4.9 (23.2)	1.8 (35.2)	6.8 (44.2)	10.6 (51.1)	14.2 (57.6)	13.7 (56.7)	9.3 (48.7)	2.7 (36.9)	−3.2 (26.2)	−8.9 (16.0)	1.5 (34.7)
Average rainfall mm (inches)	32 (1.3)	33 (1.3)	46 (1.8)	23 (0.9)	19 (0.7)	7 (0.3)	11 (0.4)	11 (0.4)	13 (0.5)	7 (0.3)	5 (0.2)	17 (0.7)	224 (8.8)
Source: Climate-data.com

Because Khalatse is about 400 metres lower than Leh, two crops can be grown each year rather than only one. By the time crops are being sown at Leh in late May, they are already half-grown at Khalatse. The first crop – usually of grim (naked barley – Hordeum vulgare L. var. nudum Hook. f., which is an ancient form of domesticated barley with an easier to remove hull) – from which tsampa, the staple food in Ladakh, is made) is usually harvested by mid-July and then other crops such as buckwheat, turnips and other vegetables are planted.

== Bibliography ==
- Francke, Rev. A. H. (1977) [1907], S. S. Gergan; F. M. Hassnain (eds.), A History of Western Tibet, Sterling Publishers – via archive.org
- Francke, A. H. (1914). Antiquities of Indian Tibet. Two Volumes. Calcutta. 1972 reprint: S. Chand, New Delhi.
- Schettler, Rolf & Margaret. (1981). Kashmir, Ladakh & Zanskar. Lonely Planet. South Yarra, Vic., Australia. ISBN 0-908086-21-0.
- Rizvi, Janet (1996), Ladakh: Crossroads of High Asia (Second ed.), Oxford University Press, ISBN 978-0-19-564016-8 – via archive.org
