= 2024 Indian general election in Ladakh =

2024 Indian election in UT of Ladakh

- 20 May 2024

Lone Lok Sabha seat from Ladakh
- Opinion polls
- Turnout: 71.82% (▲0.77%)
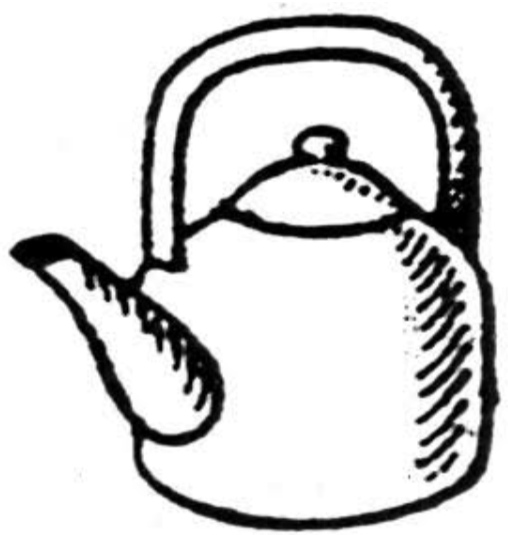

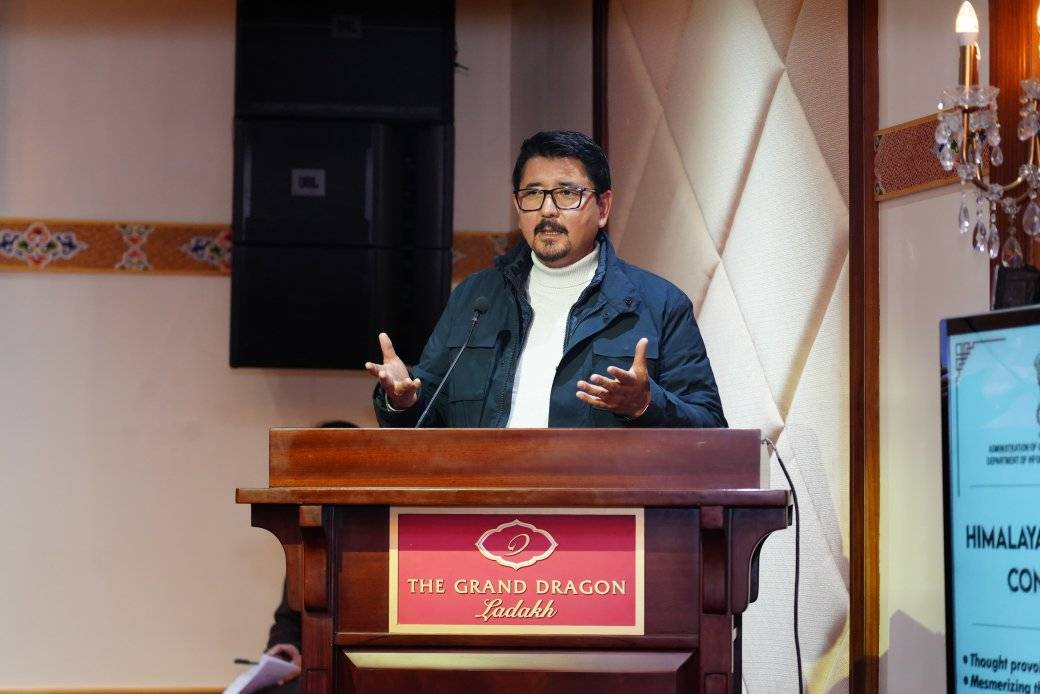
	First party	Second party	Third party
Leader	Mohmad Haneefa	Tsering Namgyal	Tashi Gyalson
Party	Independent	INC	BJP
Alliance		INDIA	NDA
Leader since	–	2020	2024
Leader's seat	Ladakh	Ladakh	Ladakh
Last election	Did not exist	16.80%, 0 seat	33.94%, 1 seat
Seats before	–	0	1
Seats won	1	0	0
Seat change	▲1	Steady	▼1
Popular vote	65,259	37,397	31,505
Percentage	48.15%	27.59%	23.58%
Swing	New	▲10.79%	▼10.36%
- Result Map of the 2024 general election in Ladakh
Prime Minister before election
Narendra Modi
BJP
Prime Minister after election
Narendra Modi
BJP

The 2024 Indian general election was held in Ladakh on 20 May 2024 to elect 1 member of the 18th Lok Sabha. These elections are the first elections to be held in Ladakh after the separating of the territory from Jammu and Kashmir under the Jammu and Kashmir Reorganisation Act, 2019 and granting it a separate Union territory status.

== Election schedule ==
Poll event	Phase
Poll event	V
Notification date	26 April 2024
Last date for filing nomination	3 May 2024
Scrutiny of nomination	4 May 2024
Last Date for withdrawal of nomination	6 May 2024
Date of poll	20 May 2024
Date of counting of votes/Result	4 June 2024

== Parties and alliances ==
=== National Democratic Alliance ===
National Democratic Alliance

Party	Flag	Symbol	Leader	Seats contested
Bharatiya Janata Party			Tashi Gyalson	1

=== Indian National Developmental Inclusive Alliance ===
Indian National Developmental Inclusive Alliance

Party	Flag	Symbol	Leader	Seats contested
Indian National Congress			Tsering Namgyal	1

== Candidates ==
Constituency					
Constituency		NDA		INDIA	
1	Ladakh	BJP	Tashi Gyalson	INC	Tsering Namgyal

== Surveys and polls ==
=== Opinion polls ===
Polling agency	Date published	Margin of error				Lead
Polling agency	Date published	Margin of error	NDA	INDIA	Others	Lead
ABP News-CVoter	March 2024	±5%	1	0	0	NDA

Polling agency	Date published	Margin of error				Lead
Polling agency	Date published	Margin of error	NDA	INDIA	Others	Lead
ABP News-CVoter	March 2024	±5%	44%	41%	15%	3

=== Exit polls ===
Polling agency				Lead
Polling agency	NDA	INDIA	Others	Lead
Actual results	0	0	1	Others

== Results ==
=== Results by alliance or party ===
Alliance/ Party		Popular vote			Seats		
Alliance/ Party		Votes	%	±pp	Contested	Won	+/−
Independent		65,259	47.96%	New	1	1	▲1
INDIA	INC	37,397	27.88%	▲10.73%	1	0	Steady
NDA	BJP	31,956	23.49%	▼10.36%	1	0	▼1
NOTA		912	0.67%	▼0.06%			
Total		1,35,524	100%	-	3	1	-

=== Results by constituency ===
Constituency		Turnout	Winner					Runner-up					Margin	
Constituency		Turnout	Party	Alliance	Candidate	Votes	%	Party	Alliance	Candidate	Votes	%	Votes	%
1	Ladakh	71.82%▲	IND	IND	Mohmad Haneefa	65,629	48.15%	INC	INDIA	Tsering Namgyal	37,397	27.59%	27,862	20.56%
