= Ladakh Lok Sabha constituency =

Parliamentary constituency in India

Coordinates: 34.2°N 77.6°E

Ladakh LA-1
- Lok Sabha constituency
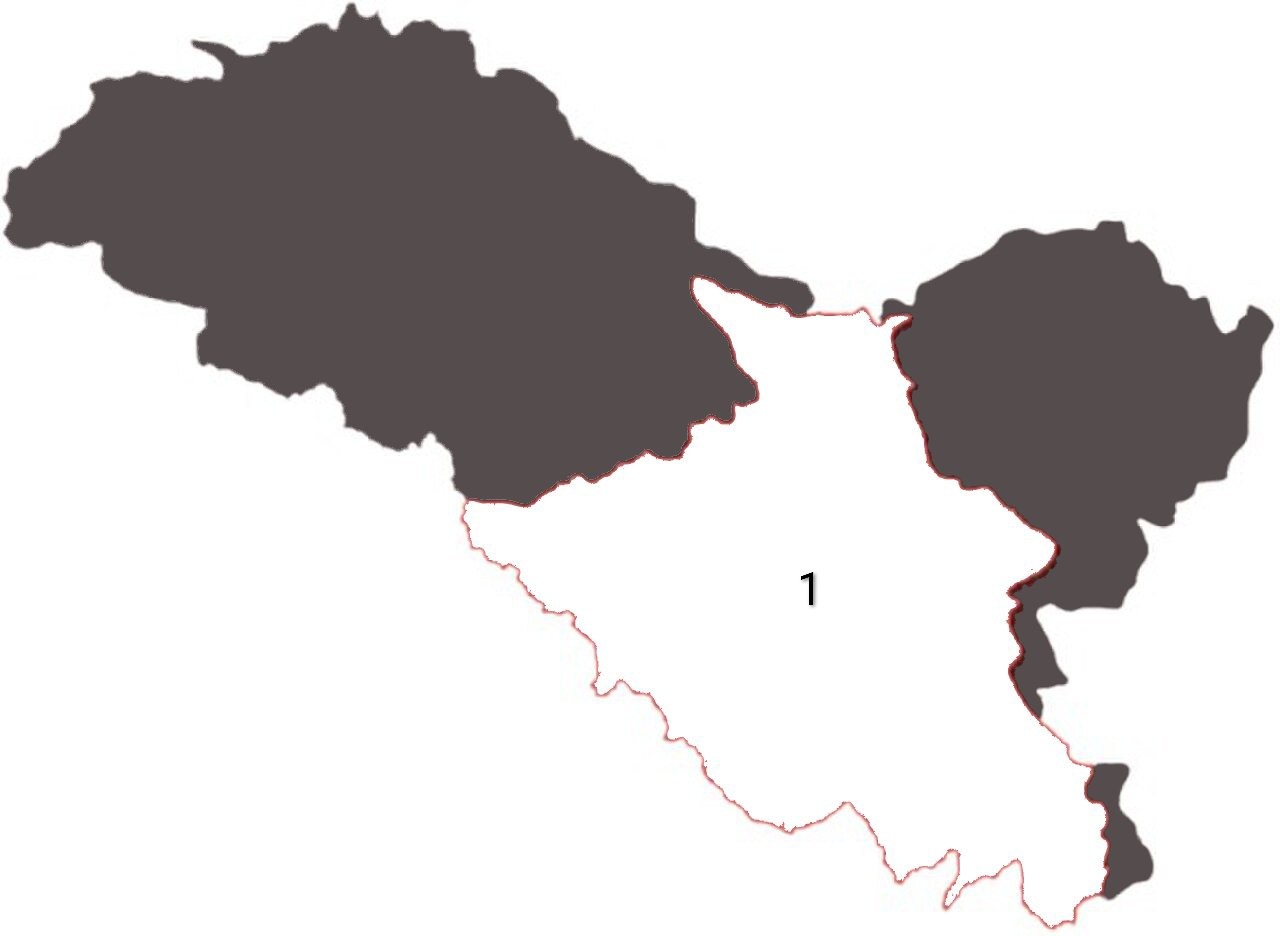
- Location of Ladakh Constituency (grey shade denotes claimed but not controlled areas)

Constituency details
- Country: India
- Union Territory: Ladakh
- Established: 1967
- Total electors: 184,808
- Reservation: None

Member of Parliament
- 18th Lok Sabha
- Incumbent Mohammad Haneefa
- Party: IND
- Alliance: INDIA
- Elected year: 2024

Ladakh Lok Sabha constituency is the only Lok Sabha constituency of the Union Territory of Ladakh, India. It is the largest such constituency in India, in terms of area, with a total area of 173,266 square kilometres (66,898 sq mi). The number of electors in the constituency was 184,808 in 2024.

== Members of Parliament ==
Year	Name	Party
1967	Kushok Bakula	Indian National Congress
1971	Kushok Bakula	Indian National Congress
1977	Parvati Devi	Indian National Congress
1980	Phuntsog Namgyal	Indian National Congress
1984	Phuntsog Namgyal	Indian National Congress
1989	Mohamad Hassan Commander	Independent
1996	Phuntsog Namgyal	Indian National Congress
1998	Syed Hussain	Jammu & Kashmir National Conference
1999	Hassan Khan	Jammu & Kashmir National Conference
2004	Thupstan Chhewang	Independent
2009	Hassan Khan	Independent
2014	Thupstan Chhewang	Bharatiya Janata Party
2019	Jamyang Tsering Namgyal	Bharatiya Janata Party
2024	Mohmad Haneefa	Independent

== Election results ==
Vote share of Winning candidates
2024	48.15%
2019	33.94%
2014	26.36%
2009	29.84%
2004	51.84%
1999	45.04%
1998	59.94%
1996	52.10%
1989	52.65%
1984	55.59%
1980	44.47%
1977	53.32%
1971	55.41%
1967	0.00%

=== 2024 ===
2024 Indian general election: Ladakh
Party	Candidate	Votes	%	±%
IND	Mohmad Haneefa	65,259	48.15	New
INC	Tsering Namgyal	37,397	27.59	▲10.79
BJP	Tashi Gyalson	31,956	23.58	▼10.36
NOTA	None of the above	912	0.67	▼0.06
Majority		27,862	20.56	▲11.92
Turnout		135,662	71.19	
Independent gain from BJP		Swing	▲48.15	

=== 2019 ===
2019 Indian general elections: Ladakh
Party	Candidate	Votes	%	±%
BJP	Jamyang Tsering Namgyal	42,914	33.94	▲7.58
IND	Sajjad Hussain	31,984	25.30	New
IND	Asgar Ali Karbalai	29,365	23.23	New
INC	Rigzin Spalbar	21,241	16.80	▼5.57
NOTA	None of the Above	922	0.73	▼0.29
Majority		10,930	8.64	▲8.61
Turnout		1,27,350	71.05	▼0.35
BJP hold		Swing	▲7.58	

=== 2014 ===
2014 Indian general elections: Ladakh
Party	Candidate	Votes	%	±%
BJP	Thupstan Chhewang	31,111	26.36	New
IND	Ghulam Raza	31,075	26.33	New
IND	Syed Mohd Kazim	28,234	23.92	New
INC	Tsering Samphel	26,402	22.37	▼4.11
NOTA	None of the Above	1,207	1.02	New
Majority		36	0.03	▼3.33
Turnout		1,19,068	71.40	
BJP gain from Independent		Swing		

=== 2009 ===
2009 Indian general election: Ladakh
Party	Candidate	Votes	%	±%
IND	Hassan Khan	32,701	29.84	
INC	Phuntsog Namgyal	29,017	26.48	
IND	Asgar Ali Karbalaie	24,498	22.36	
IND	Thinless Angmo	22,717	20.73	
JKPDP	Ghulam Murtaza	642	0.59	
Majority		3,684	3.36	
Turnout		109,575	71.86	
Independent hold		Swing		

=== 2004 ===
2004 Indian general election: Ladakh
Party	Candidate	Votes	%	±%
IND	Thupstan Chhewang	66,839	51.84	
JKNC	Hassan Khan	41,126	31.90	
IND	Wazir Mohd. Ali	18,117	14.05	
BJP	Sonam Palzor	2,849	2.21	
Majority		25,713	19.94	
Turnout				
Swing to Independent from JKNC		Swing		

=== 1999 ===
1999 Indian general election: Ladakh
Party	Candidate	Votes	%	±%
JKNC	Hassan Khan	52,187	45.04	
INC	Thupstan Chhewang	50,097	43.24	
BJP	Sonam Paljor	5,801	5.01	
JD(S)	Nassurullah Advocate	4,626	3.99	
IND	Mohd Hassan Commandar	1,530	1.32	
IND	Mohd Murtaza	1,470	1.27	
IND	Kamal Kishore	149	0.13	
Majority		2,090	1.80	
Turnout		117,671	81.88	
JKNC hold		Swing		

=== 1998 ===
1998 Indian general election: Ladakh
Party	Candidate	Votes	%	±%
JKNC	Syed Hussain	62,432	59.94	
INC	Phuntsog Namgyal	31,875	30.61	
BJP	Spalzes Angmo	8,759	8.41	
BSP	Mohd. Yaqoob Beijel	1,083	1.04	
Majority		30,557	29.33	
Turnout		105,265	73.36	
Swing to JKNC from INC		Swing		

=== 1996 ===
1996 Indian general election: Ladakh
Party	Candidate	Votes	%	±%
INC	Phuntsog Namgyal	54,592	52.10	
IND	Qamar Ali Akhoon	44,457	42.43	
BJP	Spalzes Angmo	5,728	5.47	
Majority		10,135	9.67	
Turnout		106,347	80.93	
Swing to INC from Independent		Swing		

=== 2004 ===
General Election, 2004: Ladakh
Party	Candidate	Votes	%	±%
IND	Thupstan Chhewang	66,839	51.84	
JKNC	Hassan Khan	41,126	31.90	
IND	Wazir Mohd. Ali	18,117	14.05	
BJP	Sonam Palzor	2,849	2.21	
Majority		25,713	19.94	
Turnout		128,931	73.52	
Independent hold		Swing		

=== 1989 ===
1989 Indian general election: Ladakh
Party	Candidate	Votes	%	±%
IND	Mohd. Hassan	45,151	52.65	
INC	Phuntsong Namgyal	40,612	47.35	
Majority		4,539	5.30	
Turnout		87,863	86.36	
Swing to Independent from INC		Swing		

=== 1984 ===
1984 Indian general election: Ladakh
Party	Candidate	Votes	%	±%
INC	Phuntsog Namgyal	33,037	55.59	
JKNC	Qamar Ali	25,060	42.17	
IND	Sonam Wangdus	1,331	2.24	
Majority		7,977	13.42	
Turnout		61,264	68.29	
Swing to INC from Independent		Swing		

=== 1980 ===
1980 Indian general election: Ladakh
Party	Candidate	Votes	%	±%
IND	Phuntsog Namgyal	20,314	44.47	
JKNC	Kacho Habib Ullah Khan	14,262	31.22	
IND	Kacho Mohd Ali Khan	10,797	23.64	
IND	Mohd Ali alias Ali Kargil	303	0.66	
Majority		6,052	13.25	
Turnout		48,000	61.83	
Swing to Independent from INC		Swing		

=== 1977 ===
1977 Indian general election: Ladakh
Party	Candidate	Votes	%	±%
INC	Parvati Devi	23,130	53.32	
IND	Mohammad Ali alias Ali Kargil	20,253	46.68	
Majority		2,877	6.64	
Turnout		45,581	70.44	
INC hold		Swing		

=== 1971 ===
1971 Indian general election: Ladakh
Party	Candidate	Votes	%	±%
INC	Kushok Bakula	20,783	55.41	
IND	Sonam Wahgdus	16,726	44.59	
Majority		4,057	10.82	
Turnout		37,521	71.26	
INC hold		Swing		

=== 1967 ===
1967 Indian general election: Ladakh
Party	Candidate	Votes	%	±%
INC	Kushok Bakula	Uncontested		
Majority		Unopposed		
Turnout		0	0.00	
INC win (new seat)				

== See also ==
- 2024 Indian general election in Ladakh
- Leh district
- Kargil district
- Barmer Lok Sabha constituency and Kachchh, second and third largest by area
- Malkajgiri Lok Sabha constituency, largest by population
- Lakshadweep Lok Sabha constituency, smallest by population
- List of constituencies of the Lok Sabha
