= 2026 Ladakh Autonomous Hill Development Council, Leh election =

2026 election to the Ladakh Autonomous Hill Development Council, Leh

- 4 December 2026

22 out of 26 seats in the Ladakh Autonomous Hill Development Council, Leh 12 seats needed for a majority

	Majority party	Minority party
Party	BJP	INC
Last election	15	9
Chief Executive Member before election
Tashi Gyalson
BJP
Chief Executive Member after election
TBD

The 2026 elections to the Ladakh Autonomous Hill Development Councils (LAHDCs) are scheduled to be held on 4 December 2026. These will be the first LAHDC elections following the reorganisation of Ladakh into eight districts. In Leh, the council will have 22 elected seats.

== Schedule ==
Poll event	Date
Last date for making nominations	17 November 2026
Scrutiny of nominations	18 November 2026
Last date for withdrawal	20 November 2026
Polling	4 December 2026
Completion of election process	8 December 2026

== Candidate ==
Constituency-wise Candidate per party
Constituency		Party			
#	Name	INC	BJP	IND	Total
1	Chuchot Gongma	1	1	1	3
2	Chuchot Shamma	1	1	2	4
3	Stok	0	1	3	4
4	Matho	1	1	3	5
5	Igoo	1	1	1	3
6	Sku Markha	1	1	0	2
7	Martselang	1	1	3	5
8	Sakti	1	1	2	4
9	Saboo	1	1	0	2
10	Spituk	1	1	0	2
11	Phyang	1	1	1	3
12	Nimoo	1	1	0	2
13	Basgo	1	1	0	2
14	Lingshed	1	1	2	4
15	Shey	1	1	2	4
16	Thiksay	1	1	1	3
17	Gonpa-Sankar	1	1	0	2
18	Skara	1	1	0	2
19	Skalzangling	1	1	0	2
20	Diskit Tsal	1	1	0	2
21	Skynos Skampari	1	1	1	3
22	Solar Colony	1	1	0	2
—	—	21	22	22	65

== Results ==
–	–	–
BJP	INC	IND

Vote share of different parties in the election
1. BJP (0.00%)
2. INC (0.00%)
3. IND (0.00%)

=== Results by constituency ===
Constituency-wise results
Constituency		Winner			Runner-up			Margin
No	Name	Name	Party	Votes	Name	Party	Votes	Margin
1*	Chuchot Gongma							
2	Chuchot Shamma							
3*	Stok							
4	Matho							
5*	Igoo							
6	Sku Markha							
7	Martselang							
8	Sakti							
9*	Saboo							
10*	Spituk							
11	Phyang							
12	Nimoo							
13	Basgo							
14	Lingshed							
15*	Shey							
16	Thiksay							
17*	Gonpa-Sankar							
18*	Skara							
19	Skalzangling							
20	Diskit Tsal							
21	Skynos Skampari							
22	Solar Colony							

*seats are reserve for women only

== See also ==
- Ladakh Autonomous Hill Development Council, Leh
- 2026 elections in India
