= 2023 Ladakh Autonomous Hill Development Council, Kargil election =

- 4 October 2023

26 out of 30 seats in the Ladakh Autonomous Hill Development Council, Kargil 14 seats needed for a majority
- Turnout: 77.61%
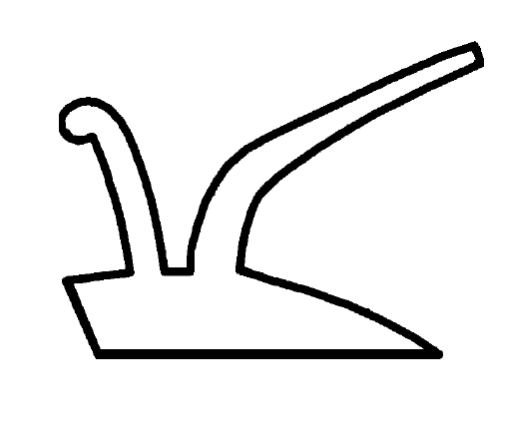

	Majority party	Minority party	Third party
Party	JKNC	INC	BJP
Alliance	I.N.D.I.A.	I.N.D.I.A.	NDA
Seats before	10	8	1
Seats won	12	10	2
Seat change	▲2	▲2	▲1
Popular vote	23,578	27,303	10,934
Percentage	30.75%	35.61%	14.26%
Chief Executive Member before election
Feroz Ahmad Khan
JKNC
Chief Executive Member after election
Mohammad Jaffer Akhone
JKNC

Elections were held in October 2023 for the 26 seats of Ladakh Autonomous Hill Development Council, Kargil. This was also the first election conducted in the union Kargil since its split from Jammu and Kashmir in 2019.

The Indian National Congress and Jammu & Kashmir National Conference did not contest the elections under the Indian National Developmental Inclusive Alliance but formed a post-poll alliance. The NC-Congress alliance won 22 seats in a landslide whereas the BJP won 2 seats, 1 more than before.

== Background ==
There were 74,026 voters including 46,762 women, who exercise their franchises through EVMs in 278 polling stations across the Kargil. Totally 85 candidates were in the fray. The voter turnout was 78%, which was an increase of 8% from the 2018 council Election, mainly due to the returning of Kargil’s migrant population for the election.

Out of 26 seats, 23 are Muslim majority seats and three are Buddhist majority seats. The Imam Khomeini Memorial Trust and Anjuman Jamiatul Ulama Islamia School-Kargil are the main Shiite seminaries in Kargil. The Imam Khomeini Memorial Trust extended its support to the Indian National Congress and the Anjuman Jamiatul Ulama Islamia School-Kargil is rooting for the Jammu & Kashmir National Conferences. The Bharatiya Janata Party had earlier promised district status to the Buddhist majority Zanskar tehsil but failed to deliver the promise and is facing resentment from people in Buddhist majority seats like Karsha and Padun which are part of Zanskar. Samanla Dorje, a Buddhist Congress leader has also said "People can no more be fooled by the promise of district status to Zanskar".

== Schedule ==
Election Department, Ladakh has announced the schedule to conduct the election for Ladakh Autonomous Hill Development Council, Kargil on 9 September 2023:

Poll Event	Date
Date from which nominations can be made	9 September 2023
Last date for making nominations	16 September 2023
Date for scrutiny of nominations	18 September 2023
Last date for the withdrawal of nominations	20 September 2023
Date on which poll shall, if necessary, be held	4 October 2023
Timing of Poll	8.00 AM to 4.00 PM
Date of counting of votes	8 October 2023
Date before which the Election shall be completed	11 October 2023

== Exit Poll ==
Seat Share Projections
Polling agency	Date published					Majority
Polling agency	Date published	JKNC	INC	BJP	Others	Majority
Gulistan News	5 oct 2023	10-12	9-11	1-3	4-5	Hung

== Results ==
12	10	2	2
JKNC	INC	BJP	IND

Vote share of different parties in the election
1. INC (35.6%)
2. JKNC (30.8%)
3. IND (19.1%)
4. BJP (14.3%)
5. AAP (0.31%)

=== Results by constituency ===
Constituency wise results
Constituency		Winner			Runner up			Margin
No	Name	Name	Party	Votes	Name	Party	Votes	Margin
1	Ranbirpora	Abdul Samad	INC	1,949	Mubarak Shah Nagvi S	JKNC	1,374	575
2	Bhimbat	Abdul Wahid	JKNC	1,947	Talib Hussain	INC	1,895	52
3	Shargole	Mohammad Jawad	INC	1,978	Mohammad Ali Chandan	BJP	1,913	65
4	Pashkum	Kacho Mohammad Feroz	INC	1,756	Mohammad Ali	IND	1,406	350
5	Taisuru	Abdul Hadi	INC	1,717	Syed Abbass	JKNC	1,456	261
6	Parkachik	Agha Anul Huda	INC	2,165	Ghulam Mohammad	IND	1,037	1,128
7	Karsha	Stanzin Jigmat	INC	1,509	Rigzin Tsewang	BJP	1,430	79
8	Padum	Punchok Tashi	JKNC	1,745	Skalzang Wangyal	BJP	1,691	54
9	Cha	Stanzin Lakpa	BJP	798	Tenzin Sonam	INC	564	234
10	Chuliskamboo	Altaf Hussain	JKNC	1,480	Reyaz Ahmad Khan	IND	1,173	307
11	Kargil Town	Mohammad Abbass Adulpa	JKNC	1,953	Mohammad Hussain	INC	668	1,285
12	Baroo	Khadim Hussain	INC	1,099	Muhammad Hanifa Jan	JKNC	1,033	66
13	Poyen	Mohammad Amin	JKNC	1,322	Haji Anayat Ali	BJP	962	360
14	Yourbaltak	Manzoor Ul Hussain	JKNC	1,452	Kacho Ahmad Ali Khan	IND	1,362	90
15	Silmoo	Feroz Ahmed Khan	JKNC	1,638	Mohammad Ali Khan	INC	665	973
16	Choskore	Nasir Hussain Munshi	INC	1,447	Mohammad Raza	JKNC	1,013	434
17	Trespone	Syed Mujtaba	JKNC	1,292	Nawaz Ali	IND	1,106	186
18	Gund Mangalpur	Syed Ali	IND	1,313	Mohammad Abbass	INC	978	335
19	Saliskote	Mohammad Sajjad	JKNC	1,144	Syed Hassan	INC	944	200
20	Lankarchey	Ghulam Haider	JKNC	1,202	Mohammad Sadiq	INC	786	416
21	Thangdumbur	Ashiq Ali	JKNC	1,643	Mohammad Ali	BJP	519	1,124
22	Thasgam Thuina	Mohammad Jaffer Akhoon	JKNC	1,405	Sheikh Mohd Hussain	INC	1,311	94
23	Barsoo	Ghulam Mohammad	IND	1,411	Ghulam Abbass Wazir	INC	1,183	228
24	Shakar	Zakir Hussain	INC	1,339	Kacho Shameem Ahmad Khan	IND	1,001	338
25	Chiktan	Liyaqut Ali Khan	INC	850	Mohsin Ali	BJP	489	361
26	Stakchay Khangral	Padma Dorjey	BJP	1,007	Syed Hassan	INC	830	177

== See also ==
- 2023 elections in India
- Ladakh Lok Sabha constituency
