= Thupstan Chhewang =

Indian politician (born 1947)

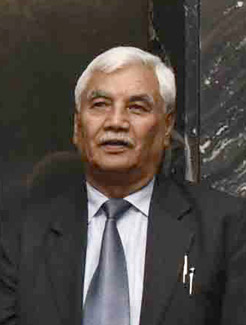
- Thupstan Chhewang in 2017

Member of Parliament, Lok Sabha
- In office 16 May 2014 – 15 November 2018
- Preceded by: Hassan Khan
- Succeeded by: Jamyang Tsering Namgyal
- Constituency: Ladakh
- In office 13 May 2004 – 16 May 2009
- Preceded by: Hassan Khan
- Succeeded by: Hassan Khan
- Constituency: Ladakh

Personal details
- Born: 1 September 1947 (age 78) Shey (Leh, Ladakh
- Party: Bharatiya Janata Party (resigned in November 2018)
- Spouse: Princess Sarla Chhewang
- Children: 1 son and 1 daughter

Thupstan Chhewang (born 1 September 1947) is an Indian politician who was a member of the 14th and 16th Lok Sabha representing the Ladakh constituency.

== Early life ==
He was born in Shey to Shey Lonpo Sonam Tsephel, an aristocrat, who chose to serve the poor by imparting education to them, and Princess Norzin Wangmo, great-great-great-granddaughter of Tsepel Tundup Namgyal, the last independent ruler of Ladakh and sister to the 19th Kushok Bakula, aunt to Galdan Thripa Thupstan Nyima, younger sister to Princess Rigzin Wangmo, grand niece to the 18th Bakula and first cousin to Princess Tsering Dolkar of Leh Khangsar. He completed his primary education until class 5th from his native village and after that Kushok Bakula Rinpochey his uncle, took him with himself to Kashmir for studies. There he used to put up at Rainawari in Pandit Nehru’s house. Back then the students of officers working in the Secretariat also used to shift to Jammu, with the annual Durbar move so during winters he would to attend Model Academy School Jammu and during summers Tyndale Biscoe School in Srinagar. Bakula Rinpochey took around 16 students to Sarnath Varanasi at Mahabodhi Intermediate College from where he did his matriculation in 1962. In 1967, he completed his graduation from Delhi University in law.

== Personal life ==
He is married into the royal family of Ladakh. His wife, Princess Sarla Chewanng is the eldest daughter of King Chhosgyal Kunzang Namgyal and sister of the present King Jigmet Namgyal. He has a son and a daughter. He practices Buddhism.

== Political career ==
He began his career as a political activist in the year 1972, when he along with some other youths organised a protest when Syed Mir Qasim visited Ladakh and was imprisoned for twenty days. He spearheaded the agitations for inclusion of the Ladakhis as Scheduled Tribes, autonomy for the region demanding the status of Union Territory for Ladakh. He served as the President of the Ladakh Buddhist Association from 1988 to 1995. He became the first Chief Executive Councilor of the local autonomous administrative body, Ladakh Autonomous Hill Development Council, Leh when elections were held for the first time in 1995. Later he formed the Ladakh Union Territory Front in year 2000. In 2004 he contested for, and won, the 14th Lok Sabha Elections as an LUTF candidate. He again won the 16th General Elections in 2014 on a BJP ticket defeating his nearest rival by a margin of just 36 votes.

He resigned from Lok Sabha in November 2018, and quit Bharatiya Janata Party citing disagreements with the party's leadership.

In 2021, he was elected as the President of the Ladakh Buddhist Association.

== Ancestry ==
He is the great-great-great-great-grandson of Tsepel Tondup Namgyal, last independent ruler of Ladakh on his mother's paternal side. He is related to kings of Zangla on his mother's maternal side since his maternal grandmother, Princess Yeshes Wangmo was the daughter of King of Zangla. He is the nephew of The 19th Kushok Bakula and great-grandnephew of the 18th Kushok Bakula. He is the first cousin of Galdan Thripa Thupstan Nyima, head of the Rizong Monastery. His wife is the daughter of King Kunzang Namgyal and Queen Diskit Wangmo. His wife is his fourth cousin as King Kunzang Namgyal is his mother Princess Norzin Wangmo's third cousin.
