= Asgar Ali Karbalai =

Indian politician from Kargil, Ladakh

Haji Asgar Ali Karbalai

Executive President of Ladakh Territorial Congress Committee
- Incumbent
- Assumed office 1 February 2020
- Preceded by: post established

Personal details
- Party: Indian National Congress
- Website: http://www.asgarkarbalai.in

Haji Asgar Ali Karbalai is an Indian political and social leader from Kargil, Ladakh. He has been the Chief Executive Councillor of Ladakh Autonomous Hill Development Council, Kargil twice. He is an influential leader in the Kargil Democratic Alliance He is an influential member of the socio-religious organisation Imam Khomeini Memorial Trust, Kargil (IKMT).

== Early life and family ==
He is the son of Sheikh Ghulam Abbas hailing from Bagh-e-Khumaini, Kargil. His father Ghulam Abass Karbalai was born in Karbala, Iraq into a Shia Muslim family and did his basic schooling studying Islamic theology there. During the massacre of Shias in Iraq by Saddam Hussein's Arab Socialist Ba'ath Party, Karbalai along with his family migrated to his hometown Kargil, in Jammu and Kashmir, India (now in Ladakh).

== Social and political life ==
He began actively participating in social activities after getting inspiration from the 1979 Iranian Revolution. By the year 2003 he had established himself on the socio-political front in the district. He was elected as a Councillor in the local administrative council - The Ladakh Autonomous Hill Development Council Kargil - from Poyen constituency. He had earlier been a member of the Kargil Progressive Alliance. He proposed the issue of granting Ladakh the status of Greater Ladakh, for the first time at an international platform, in a conference at London which was a new clause in the Kashmir issue. He is vocal about supporting the Kashmiris based on centuries of traditional, economic and religious ties but is stiffly opposed to the idea of separatism.

He was elected as a member of the first LAHDC Kargil (representing Poyen constituency) in 2003 and served as a councillor. He became the second chief executive councillor of LAHDC-Kargil as the previous government could not meet the majority seats and was toppled down soon. During the second term of LAHDC-Kargil he acted as the leader of the opposition party. During the third term of LAHDC-Kargil, he represented Pashkyum constituency and led his party to a second term. He won a majority and became chairman/CEC.
