= 20th Kushok Bakula Rinpoche =

Current incarnation of Kushok Bakula Rinpoche (born 2005)

His Holiness 20th Kushok Bakula Rinpoche
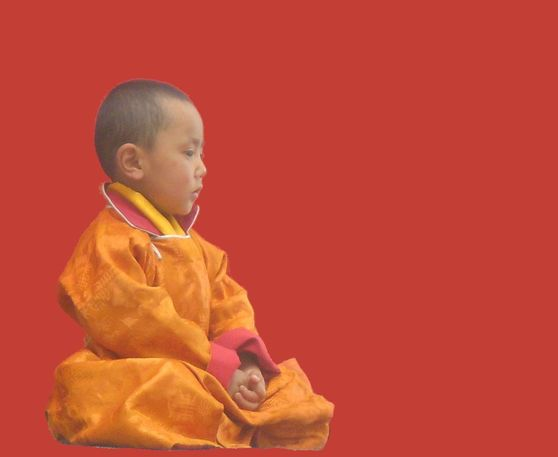
- Title: Kushok Bakula Rinpoche

Personal life
- Born: 23 January 2005 (age 21) Kyagar, Nubra, Ladakh, India

Religious life
- Religion: Tibetan Buddhism
- Consecration: 12 August 2010

Senior posting
- Period in office: 24 November 2005 –
- Predecessor: 19th Kushok Bakula Rinpoche

20th Kushok Bakula Rinpoche, Thubstan Nawang or Stanzin Nawang Jigmed Wangchuk, (born 23 January 2005) was born to Yab Dorjey Tsering and Yum Sonam Dolkar in Kyagar village in Nubra valley in Ladakh and has been introduced to the monastic life in Samstanling Gonpa before enthroned on 12 August 2010 in Pethup Gonpa in Spituk. He is believed to be the 20th incarnation of Kushok Bakula Rinpoche.
