= Ladakh Union Territory Front =

Political alliance supporting union-territory status for Ladakh in India

- Abbreviation: LUTF
- Founded: 2002
- Dissolved: 2010
- Merged into: Bharatiya Janata Party
- Headquarters: Leh, Ladakh, India
- Ideology: Union Territory status for Ladakh
- Colors: Blue

Ladakh Union Territory Front (LUTF) was formed in 2002 as a conglomerate of political parties in Ladakh in India.

== History ==
Its basic objective was to fight for the Union Territory status for Ladakh. A consortium of political parties formed in 2002 decided that a regional party shall be formed under a single flag and carry the struggle for the Union territory status for Ladakh. Things changed when few of the nominated candidates shifted sides and joined Indian National Congress (INC). Since then a kind of bipartisan politics begun in Ladakh between the LUTF and the Indian National Congress.

=== Merger ===
In 2010, when the elections for LAHDC, Leh, was round the corner, LUTF merged into Bharatiya Janata Party (BJP). Subsequently, the BJP won 4 out of 26 seats on the council in this election.

== Fulfillment of demand ==
In August 2019, the Parliament of India passed an act by which Ladakh became a union territory on 31 October 2019.

== Support from Gilgit Baltistan ==
Gilgit-Baltistan activist Senge H Sering supported Ladakh as separate Union Territory.

== See also ==
- Ladakh
- Politics of Ladakh
- Ladakh Autonomous Hill Development Council, Leh
- Ladakh Autonomous Hill Development Council, Kargil
- Ladakh Buddhist Association
