= Kushok Bakula Rinpoche =

Tibetan Buddhist tulku lineage

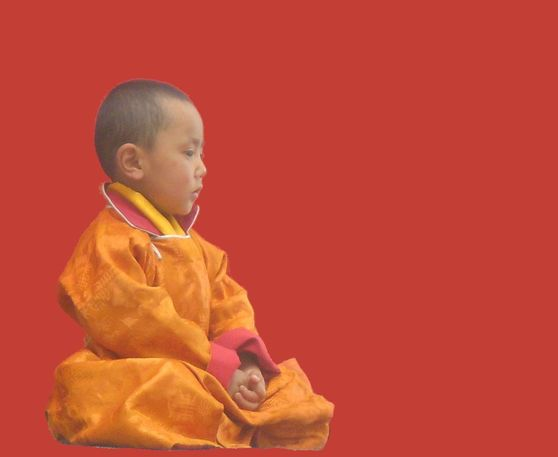
20th Kushok Bakula Rinpoche in 2010

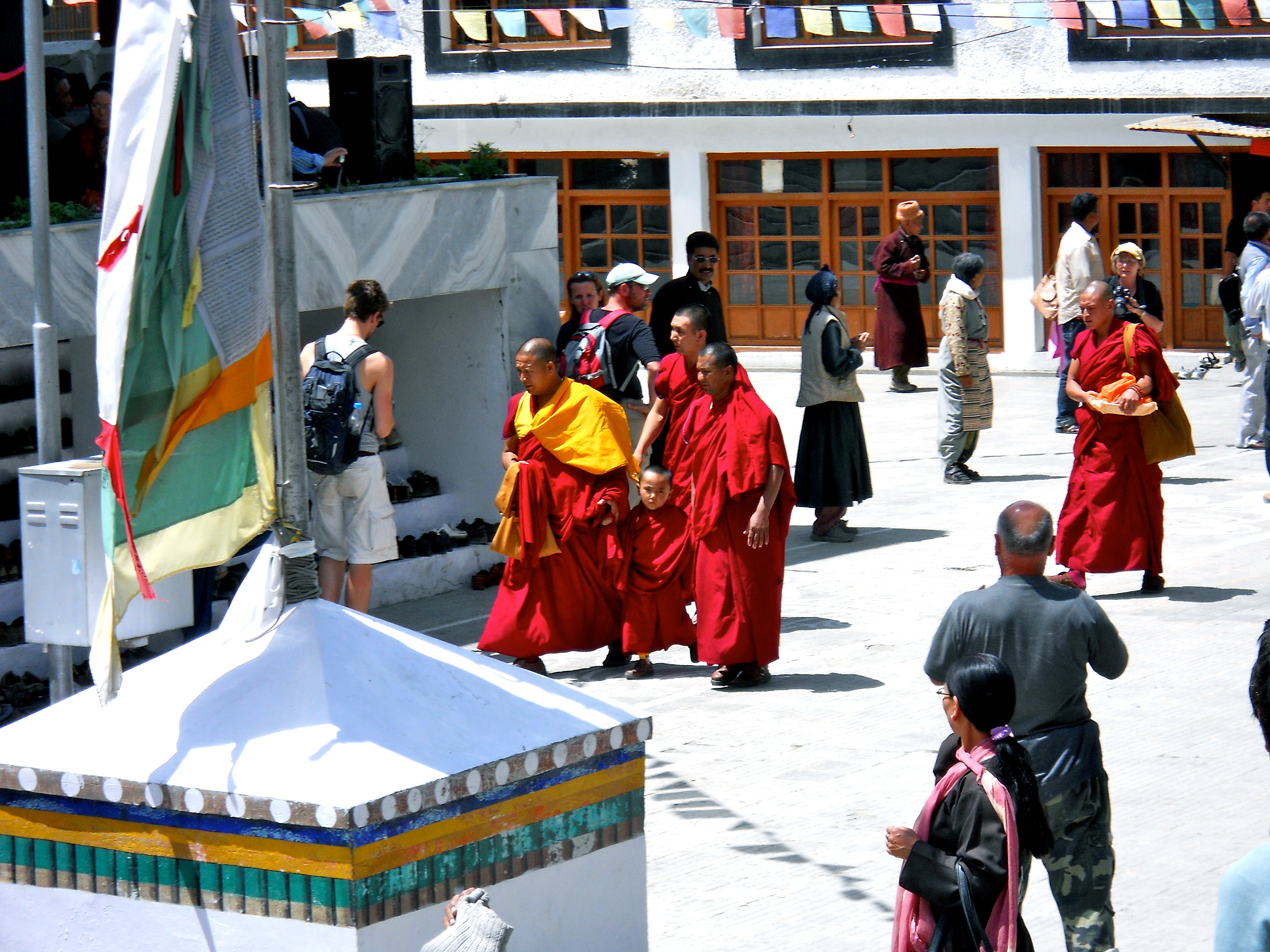
20th Kushok Bakula Rinpoche in 2011

Kushok Bakula Rinpoche (Tibetan: སྐུ་ཤོག་བ་ཀུ་ལ་རིན་པོ་ཆེ།) is nowadays the head of Pethup Gompa Tibetan Buddhist monastery in Spituk, Ladakh, India. According to his followers he is an emanation of the Buddha Amitabha and was one of the 16 disciples of Buddha (Naytan Chudrug, or the Sixteen Arhats). They also claim that his first 19 incarnations have been documented in the Tibetan text Naytan Chagchot (Wylie: gNas hrtan phyag mchod).

== Name ==
There are two different explanations for his name.

According to Tibetan chronicles, he was fond of doing meditation and praying and was very simple. After renouncing all worldly comforts he used pakula grass in his everyday life, especially as a sitting and sleeping mat.

The Manorathapurani and the Pali version of Milindapanha maintain him as being born at Kaushambi in a minister's family and then having been swallowed by a fish in the Yamuna river that was later caught by an angler. The angler sold the fish to another minister's wife, and upon cutting it open, the child was found unharmed and alive. The minister's wife adopted him. However, a dispute with his natural parents, about who should take care of him was resolved by the king, who judged that both should have custody of him. Thus, he became known as Dva Kula (Two Families).

== Incarnations ==
- 2nd: the second incarnation of Bakula was an Indian Mahasiddha Tilopa (Tibetan: ཏི་ལོ་པ, Wylie: Ti lo pa), or Sherab Zangpo (Tibetan: ཤེས་རབ་བཟང་པོ, Wylie: Shes rab bzang po) (Prajnabhadra). In order to spread the Buddha dharma, the king of Visnunagar offered Tilopa, a learned guru, 500 gold coins a day, if he would live at his court. Tilopa, however, wanted rather to live as a yogi and he quietly departed from the court and retreated near a cemetery to meditate. During that time, Naropa came to serve him. And through the practice of the six famous yoga lams (paths) he attained the mahamudra siddhi. After preaching extensively, he entered the heavenly abode of Amitābha during his lifetime.
- 3rd: manifested as the Indian Mahasiddha Luipa (Wylie: Laa wa pa). He abandoned his kingdom in Sri Lanka and journeyed to Ramesvaram, where he became a Bhikkhu. A Dakini at Dorje Dan (Tibetan: རྡོ་རྗེ་གདན, Wylie: rDo rje gdan) (Bodh Gaya) revealed to him an upaya for realising Buddhahood -- and in this way he continued practising for many years in a cemetery. Dakinis at Pataliputra further instructed him to remove his royal pride about the purity of foods, after which he sat in meditation for twelve years near river Ganges, where he lived on the minute guts of fish rejected by the fishermen.
- 4th: a king who appears in the religious book 'Kadam Buchos'.
- 5th: Aryasura (Lopon Pawo, Wylie: sLob dpon dpa' bo), the disciple of Nagarjuna (Gonbo Ludup, Wylie: mGon po klu grub).
- 6th: Gyalwa Chogyangs, (Wylie: rGyal ba mchog dbyangs), one of Lopon Padma's twenty-five disciples.
- 7th: Ratna Udam (Nyamet Rinchen Chondus, Wylie: mNyam med rin chen brtson 'grus), the disciple of Kasdup Kyungpo, (Wylie: mKhas grub 'khyung po).
- 8th: Yeshe Dzin, dharmaguru of King Gedun Bang.
- 9th: Lotsawa Rinchen Sangpo, 954 - 1055.
- 10th: Geshe Chagpa Thrichog of the Kadmapa tradition.
- 11th: Rechung Dorje Drakpa, 1083/4 – 1161
- 12th: Sthavira Lodros Choskyong was Khedrup Rinpoche's main disciple.
- 13th: Drupchen Choskyi Dorje (Mahasiddha Dharmavajra) was the pupil of Basco Chokyi Gyaltsen (Dharmadhvaja).
- 14th: Lobzang Jinpa (Sumatidana) was the main disciple of Lobsang Palden Yeshe, 6th Panchen Lama.
- 15th: Yongdzin Yeshe Gyaltsen was the tutor of Jamphel Gyatso, 8th Dalai Lama.
- 16th: Jetsun Ngawang Jampek Yeshe Gyatso, Khempo of Loseling.
- 17th: Kongchog Rangdrol Nyima was the first Incarnation to appear in Ladakh, he appeared in Lamayuru Monastery.
- 18th: Born in the Royal palace of Zanskar,"zangla Khar"
- 19th: Thupstan Chognor (Wylie: thub bstan mchog nor), 21 May 1917 – 4 November 2003
- 20th: Thubstan Nawang (Wylie: thub bstan ngag dbang), born 24 November 2005
