= Hassan Khan (politician) =

Indian politician (1936–2024)

Al-Haaj, Shri Ghulam Hassan Khan

Member of the Indian Parliament for Ladakh
- In office 10 October 1999 – 6 February 2004
- Preceded by: Syed Hussain
- Succeeded by: Thupstan Chhewang
- In office 2009–2014
- Preceded by: Thupstan Chhewang
- Succeeded by: Thupstan Chhewang

Personal details
- Born: Ghulam Hassan; 11 December 1936 Silmoo, Batalik, Jammu and Kashmir, India
- Died: 17 December 2024 (aged 88) Jammu, Jammu and Kashmir, India
- Citizenship: Indian
- Party: Jammu & Kashmir National Conference
- Other political affiliations: Independent Candidate
- Spouse: Zeben Nissa
- Children: Feroze Khan and 4 Others
- Parent: Ghulam Muhammad And Smt. Khatija
- Education: Kashmir University
- Occupation: Politician, Police Officer
- Profession: Agriculturist

Haji Ghulam Hassan Khan (11 December 1936 – 17 December 2024) was an Indian politician from the union territory of Ladakh.

== Background ==
Khan was born at Silmo a village of Batalik, Kargil on 11 December 1936. He married Zeben Nissa on 18 December 1963, and he had a bachelor's degree in arts from the University of Kashmir.

Khan died in Jammu on 17 December 2024, at the age of 88.

== Political career ==
- 1999, was elected to 13th Lok Sabha.
- 1999–2000, served as a Member, Committee on Transport and Tourism Member, Committee on Science and Technology, Environment and Forests.
- 2000–2004, served as a Member, Consultative Committee, Ministry of Defence.
- 2009, was re-elected to 15th Lok Sabha (2nd term) on 31 Aug.
- 2009, was a Member, Committee on Labour.

In the 15th Lok Sabha elections, over denial of mandate by the National Conference he fought against the Congress candidate in Ladakh as an independent candidate and won. Though later he announced his decision to return to the National Conference at a news conference, termed by JKNC chief Farooq Abdullah as his "Homecoming" however due to political circumstances he had to clarify later on that he would be only lending unconditional support to the UPA and won't be re- joining the JKNC. Even in 2013 he was recorded as an Independent MP in the Lok Sabha records.

In September 2013 he contested as a councilor and won from Silmo constituency in the 3rd General elections of the LAHDC Kargil. It was his case that brought to the front the peculiarity in the LAHDC Act 1995 as he held the seat of a councilor and was yet to resign as the Member of Parliament, Ladakh.

== See also ==
- Leh
- Kargil district
