= Nawang Rigzin Jora =

Indian politician

President of Ladakh Territorial Congress Committee
- Incumbent
- Assumed office 1 February 2020
- Preceded by: post established

Minister for Urban Development and Urban Local Bodies, Jammu and Kashmir
- In office 5 January 2009 – 8 January 2015
- Chief Minister: Omar Abdullah

Personal details
- Born: 2 February 1958 (age 68) Leh, Jammu and Kashmir (Now Union Territory of Ladakh)
- Party: Indian National Congress (from 1995)

Nawang Rigzin Jora is an Indian politician and former Minister for Urban Development and Urban Local Bodies, Ladakh, India.

== Early life and education ==
Nawang Rigzin Jora was born on 2 February 1958 in Ladakh, then part of Jammu and Kashmir, India. He is an alumnus of St. Stephen's college Delhi.

== Political career ==
Nawang Rigzin Jora is a former Minister for Urban Development and Urban Local Bodies. Before that, he was the Minister for Tourism & Culture. Before joining politics, he was a member of the Ladakh Buddhist Association, Leh, a strong organisation and a member of World Buddhist Fellowship, and actively participated in an agitation for grant of Union Territory Status for Ladakh region. Later, when in a compromise between the government of India and the Ladakh Buddhist Association a separate administrative unit "The Ladakh Autonomous Hill Development Council, Leh" was created in 1995, he became one of the four Executive Councillors of the newly constituted "Ladakh Autonomous Hill Development Council" under the leadership of the former president of Ladakh Buddhist Association Mr. Thupstan Chhewang.

== Personal life ==
He is married to Tsetan Dolker of Lachumir, and has a son and a daughter.
