= 2020 Ladakh Autonomous Hill Development Council, Leh election =

Council election of India

2020 Ladakh Autonomous Hill Development Council, Leh
- 26 October 2020

26 out of 30 seats in the Ladakh Autonomous Hill Development Council, Leh 14 seats needed for a majority

	Majority party	Minority party
Party	BJP	INC
Last election	18	5
Seats won	15	9
Seat change	▼3	▲4
Chief Executive Member before election
Gyal P Wangyal
BJP
Chief Executive Member
Tashi Gyalson
BJP

Elections were held in October 2020 for the 26 seats of Ladakh Autonomous Hill Development Council, Leh. The Bharatiya Janata Party won 15 and formed the government with a majority while the Indian National Congress won 9 seats respectively out of the 26 seats. The other 2 seats were won by 2 independent candidates.

Tashi Gyalson of the Bharatiya Janata Party was elected the Chief Executive Councillor. The previous elections were held in 2015. It was also first election after Ladakh made as the separate union territory.

== Results ==
15	9	2
BJP	INC	IND

Constituency wise results
Constituency		Winner		Runner up		Margin
No	Name	Name	Party	Name	Party	Margin
1	TURTUK	Ghulam Mehdi	BJP	Ghulam Hussain	IND	BJP won by 367 votes
2	HUNDAR	Kunzang Lotus	BJP	Stanzin Chotar	INC	BJP won by 420 votes
3	DISKIT	Tsering Angchuk	BJP	Tsewang Rigzin	INC	BJP won by 570 votes
4	TEGAR	Rigzen Lundup	BJP	Jigmet Stobgais	INC	BJP won by 416 votes
5	PANAMIK	Tsering Sandup	BJP	Rigzin Norboo	INC	BJP won by 376 votes
6	TANGTSE	Tashi Namgyal	BJP	Namgyal Dorjey	INC	BJP won by 180 votes
7	CHUSHUL	Konchok Stanzin	IND	Konchok Tsepel	BJP	IND won by 309 votes
8	NYOMA	Ishey Spalzang	IND (Joined BJP)	Thuptan Wangchuk	INC	IND won by 16 votes
9	KUNGYAM	Thinles Nurboo	BJP	Skarma Zotpa	INC	BJP won by 133 votes
10	KORZOK	Karma Namdak	BJP	Gurmet Dorjey	INC	BJP won by 566 votes
11	SAKTI	Rigzin Tsering	INC	Urgain Phuntsog	AAP	INC won by 20 votes
12	IGOO	Sonam Thardos	INC	Tsering Palden	BJP	INC won by 79 votes
13	MARTSELANG	Stanzin Chosphel	BJP	Eshey Tsering	INC	BJP won by 684 votes
14	THIKSAY	Stanzin Chosfail	BJP	Tundup Gyatso	INC	BJP won by 344 votes
15	CHUCHOT	Mirza Hussain	BJP	Sayeeda Bano	IND	BJP won by 735 votes
16	UPPER LEH	Phuntsog Stanzin Tsepag	INC	Tsering Namgail	IND	INC won by 36 votes
17	LOWER LEH	Tsering Namgyal	INC	P. Wangdan	BJP	INC won by 1116 votes
18	PHYANG	Tundup Nurbu	INC	Phunchok Dorjey	BJP	INC won by 57 votes
19	SKU MARKHA	Sonam Nurboo	BJP	Tsewang Gyaltsan	IND	BJP won by 67 votes
20	BASGO	Tsering Norboo	INC	Dorji Angchok	BJP	INC won by 223 votes
21	SASPOL	Smanla Dorje Nurboo	INC	Tsewang Nurboo	IND	INC won by 481 votes
22	TEMISGAM	Sonam Dorjey	INC	Tsering Wangchok	BJP	INC won by 245 votes
23	KHALTSI	Lobzang Sherab	BJP	Jigmet Rabgais	INC	BJP won by 9 votes
24	SKURBUCHAN	Lundup Dorjai	INC	Phuntsog Stanzin	BJP	INC won by 122 vote
25	LAMAYOURU	Morup Dorjey	BJP	Dorjey Gailson	INC	BJP won by 237 votes
26	LINGSHET	Tashi Gyalson	BJP	Kunchok Norboo	INC	BJP won by 311 votes

== See also ==
- 2020 elections in India
