= 2026 Ladakh Autonomous Hill Development Council, Kargil election =

2026 election to the Ladakh Autonomous Hill Development Council, Kargil

- 4 December 2026

17 out of 25 seats in the Ladakh Autonomous Hill Development Council, Kargil (Note: one won unopposed by INC & 3 in Shakar-Chiktan subdivision called for boycott due to delimitation issue) 9 seats needed for a majority
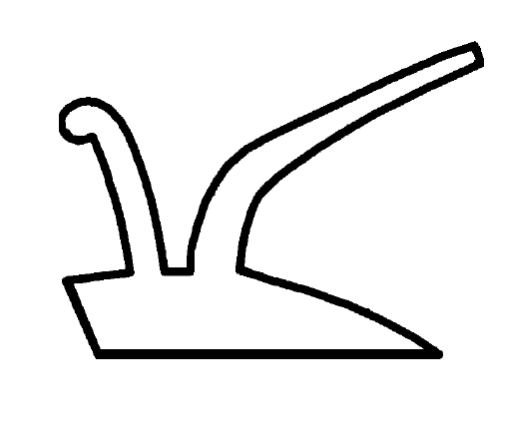

	Majority party	Minority party	Third party
Party	JKNC	INC	BJP
Last election	12	10	2
Seats won		1
Chief Executive Member before election
Mohammad Jaffer Akhoon
JKNC
Chief Executive Member after election
TBD

The 2026 elections to the Ladakh Autonomous Hill Development Councils (LAHDCs) are scheduled to be held on 4 December 2026. These will be the first LAHDC elections following the reorganisation of Ladakh into eight districts. In Kargil, the council will have 21 elected seats.

== Schedule ==
Poll event	Date
Last date for making nominations	17 November 2026
Scrutiny of nominations	18 November 2026
Last date for withdrawal	20 November 2026
Polling	4 December 2026
Completion of election process	8 December 2026

== Candidate ==
Constituency-wise Candidate per party
Constituency		Party				
#	Name	INC	BJP	JKNC	IND	Total
1	Choskore	1	0	0	2	3
2	Karkitchoo	0	1	1	1	3
3	Hardass	1	0	1	3	5
4	Chuliskambo	1	1	1	0	3
5	Minjee	1	1	0	2	4
6	Shargole	1	1	0	0	2
7	Lotchum	1 (unopposed)	0	0	0	1
8	Pashkum	1	0	0	1	2
9	Khangral	0	0	0	0	0
10	Shakar	0	0	0	0	0
11	Chiktan	0	0	0	0	0
12	Wakha	1	1	0	0	2
13	Apati Barchay	0	1	1	2	4
14	Yourbaltak	0	0	1	2	3
15	Akchamal	0	0	0	2	2
16	Silmo	1	0	0	2	3
17	Chanchik	0	0	0	3	3
18	Drethang Balti Bazar	0	1	0	2	3
19	Goma Kargil	1	0	0	1	2
20	Poyen	1	0	1	1	3
21	Baroo	1	0	0	1	2
—	—	12	7	6	25	49

== Results ==
–	1	–	–
JKNC	INC	BJP	IND

Vote share of different parties in the election
1. INC (0.00%)
2. JKNC (0.00%)
3. BJP (0.00%)
4. IND (0.00%)

=== Results by constituency ===
Constituency-wise results
Constituency		Winner			Runner-up			Margin
No	Name	Name	Party	Votes	Name	Party	Votes	Margin
1	Choskore							
2	Karkitchoo							
3*	Hardass							
4*	Chuliskambo							
5	Minjee							
6	Shargole							
7*	Lotchum	Sayeda Banoo	INC	Unopposed	N/A	N/A	N/A	N/A
8	Pashkum							
9	Khangral	Election boycotted due to delimitation issues in Shakar-Chiktan subdivision						
10	Shakar	Election boycotted due to delimitation issues in Shakar-Chiktan subdivision						
11	Chiktan	Election boycotted due to delimitation issues in Shakar-Chiktan subdivision						
12	Wakha							
13	Apati Barchay							
14*	Yourbaltak							
15	Akchamal							
16	Silmo							
17	Chanchik							
18	Drethang Balti Bazar							
19*	Goma Kargil							
20*	Poyen							
21*	Baroo							

*seats are reserve for women only

== See also ==
- Ladakh Autonomous Hill Development Council, Kargil
- 2026 elections in India
