= Sheikh Hussain Zakiri =

Indian Islamic scholar (c.1940–2016)

Sheikh Muhammad Hussain Zakiri
- Title: Hujjatul Islam wal Muslimeen

Personal life
- Born: Muhammad Hussain; 1940 Bagh-e-Khomieni, Kargil district, India
- Died: 28 July 2016 (aged 75–76) Bagh-e-Khomieni, Kargil district, India
- Cause of death: Illness
- Resting place: Bagh-e-Khomieni, Kargil
- Era: Modern Era
- Region: [Kargil [Ladakh]], India
- Main interest(s): Islamic Philosophy, Vilayat-e-Faqih
- Notable work: Behest-i-Lamstan
- Education: Houza ilmiya, Najaf

Religious life
- Religion: Islam
- Jurisprudence: Ja`fari
- Creed: Twelver Shi`a Islam

Muslim leader
- Influenced by: Ruhollah Khomeini
- Influenced: Asgar Ali Karbalie

Sheikh Muhammad Hussain Zakiri (c. 1940 – 28 July 2016) was a Shia Islamic religious scholar/alim from Kargil, Indian Administered Kashmir and the founder of Imam Khomeini Memorial Trust, Kargil. He was deeply influenced by Islamic Revolution of Iran and its founder Ayatollah Ruhollah Khomeini. In 1989 Zakiri established the trust named after Ayatollah Khomeini which played a key role, not only in educational and social sectors, but gave a new direction and meaning to politics of this most neglected region of the state. He was a prominent poet and scholarly person having published many books and poetic collections.

== Early life ==
Sheikh Zakiri was born in about the year 1940 at Bagh-e-Khomeni Kargil in a middle-class family.

== Education and positions ==
After his basic education at home, he went to Najaf in Iraq for Islamic studies. He returned to Kargil in 1971 and formed a religious organization Anjuman-e-Muin-e-Islam in 1973 which provided basic Islamic Education to children. He also advocated various issues related to women and their rights. By the year 1989 Zakiri had developed a large following and established a trust named after Ayatollah Khomeini which played a key role, not only in educational and social sectors, but gave a new direction and meaning to politics of this most neglected region of the state. He was also instrumental in opening a network of schools across the region for modern education of Kargil children. IKMT - The trust that he founded under his command became a decisive player in local politics, though he himself shunned the lure of power politics and eked out his living by working in farms.

== Death ==
He died in the wee hours of 28 July 2016 after a brief illness. He was 76 years old. The entire Kargil market was closed and more than 20,000 people assembled at Hussaini Park Kargil where his Nimaz Jinaza was performed by Hujatul Islam Wal Muslameen Sheikh Mohammad Mohaqiq.
