= Imam Khomeini Memorial Trust, Kargil =

Imam Khomeini Memorial Trust
- Abbreviation: IKMT
- Formation: 1989
- Type: Socio-Religious
- Legal status: Registered Trust
- Headquarters: Kargil
- Region served: Ladakh
- Official language: Urdu
- Key people: Shiekh Muhammad Hussain Zakiri, Founder And Chief Patron of IKMT Asgar Ali Karbalai, Sheikh Muhammad Mohaqiq. shiekh Sadiq Rajai (Chairman IKMT). Mohammad Hussain Lutfi.
- Subsidiaries: Mutahhary Educational Society, Baqirya Health & Research Center,
- Website: www.ikmtkargil.org.in

Imam Khomieni Memorial Trust, Kargil - Ladakh (Urdu: امام خمینی میموریل ٹرسٹ کرگل لداخ) is a socio-religious organisation in Kargil, Ladakh, India. It was founded in the year 1989 by a group of young volunteers. The Iranian Revolution was the basic reason for formation of the Trust. The sole aim of the trust is to keep the principles and values set by Ayatollah Khomeini alive and particularly his last will emphasizing the unity of Muslim Umah and helping the cause of oppressed and downtrodden people of the world.

== Sub organisations ==
1. Mutahhary Educational Society
2. Baqiria Health Care & Research Centre
3. Zanabia Women Welfare Society (Women's Wing)
4. Basij-E-Imam (Volunteers)
5. Jamia-e-Zahra women college affiliated with Al mustafa International and Aligragh Muslim University
6. Jamia-e-Imam Khomeini Boys college affiliated with Al mustafa International and Aligragh Muslim University
7. Lujnat-ul-Khaira
8. Baseej-e-Rohani
9. Voice Of Ladakh/ Leading Regional News Paper
10. Media Cell IKMT
11. Bazm-E-Adab. Poetry Wing
12. Khawja Ghulam-us-Sayidain Library
13. Baseej-e-Zaraat wa Baghbani (Agricultural Wing)
