= Mohamad Hassan Commander =

Indian politician

Mohamad Hassan Commander (born October 1938) is a politician belonging to Kargil Ladakh in Ladakh union territory of India. He is affiliated with the Indian National Congress and is a senior member of its district unit.

In 1989 he was elected as an independent to Lok Sabha from the Ladakh constituency.
