= Tashi Gyalson =

Indian politician, from Ladakh

Adv. Tashi Gyalson
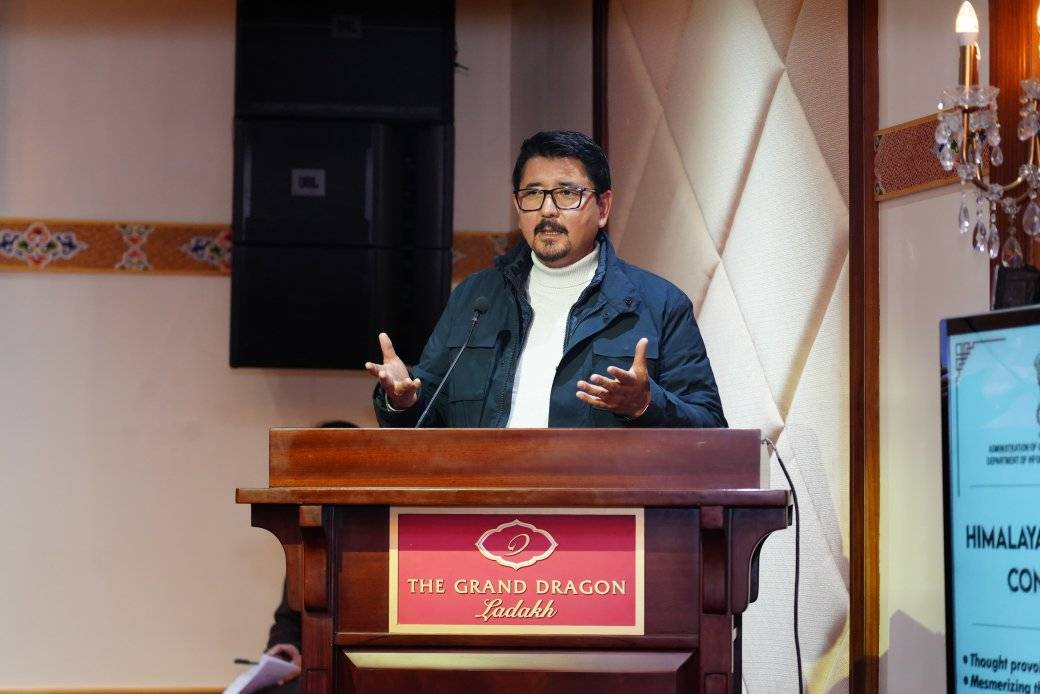

Former CEC/Chairman, LAHDC Leh
- In office 31, October, 2020 – 31 October 2025
- Preceded by: Sh. Gyal Wangyal

Personal details
- Born: 11 February 1975 (age 51) Leh, Ladakh, India
- Party: BJP
- Spouse: Tsetan Angmo
- Children: Jigmet Edzes Wangmo and Jetsun Siya Mentok

Adv. Tashi Gyalson is a prominent political leader, lawyer, and public figure from the Union Territory of Ladakh, India. A member of the Bharatiya Janata Party (BJP) , he is known for his pragmatic leadership, legal acumen, and advocacy for Ladakh’s development and cultural preservation. Gyalson rose to prominence as the Former Chief Executive Councillor (CEC) of the Ladakh Autonomous Hill Development Council, Leh, and was nominated as the BJP’s candidate Ladakh Lok Sabha constituency in 2024 Indian general election. Former Chairman/Chief Executive Councilor of the Ladakh Autonomous Hill Development Council, Leh.

== Education ==
Adv Tashi Gyalson holds a Bachelor's Degree in Law from Campus Law Centre, University of Delhi.

== Political career ==
Tashi Gyalson's political journey began as a student leader with his association with the BJP Yuva Morcha in 1997, where he was part of the founding team in Ladakh. However, he quit the BJP in 2000 and returned to the fold in 2019. In between, he was associated Jammu and Kashmir People's Democratic Party. In 2014, he contested the Assembly Election from the Nubra Assembly Constituency in Ladakh as a PDP candidate.

A staunch advocate for Union Territory (UT) status for Ladakh, Gyalson played a pivotal role in disbanding the PDP in the Leh district and joining the Ladakh Union Territory Front, a unified platform demanding UT status for Ladakh. Later his staunch support to UT status to Ladakh led to his expulsion from the PDP after he signed a memorandum supporting UT status for Ladakh. Gyalson returned to active politics in 2019, rejoining the BJP. His return to the BJP marked the beginning of his rise as a key political figure in Ladakh.

In the 2020 LAHDC Leh elections, Gyalson was elected as a councilor from the Lingshed constituency and subsequently became the Chairman and Chief Executive Councillor of the 6th LAHDC, Leh. As the head of LAHDC-Leh, Gyalson has been instrumental in addressing issues such as infrastructure development, focus on holistic education, environmental conservation, and the preservation of Ladakh's cultural identity.

== 2024 Lok Sabha Candidacy ==
In April 2024, the Bharatiya Janata Party (BJP) announced Tashi Gyalson as its candidate for the Ladakh Lok Sabha constituency, replacing the incumbent MP Jamyang Tsering Namgyal, amid anti-incumbency sentiments and growing demands for Sixth Schedule implementation. The decision was widely viewed as a strategic move to address anti-incumbency sentiments and bolster the party's standing in the region. Gyalson, was considered a strong candidate due to his clean image, grassroots connect & administrative experience. However, despite his credentials, Gyalson lost the parliamentary election.

== Role in High-Powered Committee ==
In November 2023, Tashi Gyalson was appointed as a member of a high-powered committee constituted by the Ministry of Home Affairs to address the demands of the people of Ladakh. The committee, chaired by Minister of State Nityanand Rai, was tasked with ensuring the protection of land and employment for Ladakh's residents. Despite several rounds of talks, the dialogue reached an impasse in 2024, highlighting the complexities of the issue.

== Political Stance and Vision ==
Tashi Gyalson is a staunch supporter of Ladakh's Union Territory status and has consistently advocated for the region's development. However, he has maintained a nuanced position on the Sixth Schedule, emphasizing the need for detailed discussions and a balanced approach. His leadership is characterized by a focus on dialogue, inclusivity, and sustainable development.

== Awards and recognition ==
In 2025, Tashi Gyalson was honoured with the Mahakaruna Award by the Mahabodhi International Meditation Centre to mark the Mahakaruna Diwas. The award recognized Gyalson's leadership and commitment to compassionate governance, particularly his focus on social welfare, education, and sustainable development in Ladakh.
