= LAHDC, Zanskar =

Autonomous administrative division in Ladakh, India

Ladakh Autonomous Hill Development Council, Zanskar

Type
- Type: Autonomous District Council of the Zanskar district
- Seats: 9 Councillors

Elections
- Voting system: 9 plurality voting
- Last election: New
- Next election: 4 December 2026

Meeting place
- Padum, Ladakh

Ladakh Autonomous Hill Development Council, Zanskar (LAHDC Zanskar), is an Autonomous District Council in Ladakh. LAHDC Zanskar administers the Zanskar district of Ladakh, India.

== History ==
It is created in 2026 through expansion of LAHDC across all districts in Ladakh.

== See also ==
- LAHDC, Kargil
- LAHDC, Drass
- LAHDC, Leh
