= Ladakh Police =

Police department of Union territory of Ladakh, India

- Ladakh Police Insignia
- Abbreviation: L.P.
- Motto: Khidmat aur Himmat (Service & Courage)

Agency overview
- Formed: 31 October 2019

Jurisdictional structure
- Operations jurisdiction: Ladakh, India
- Map of the Ladakh Police's jurisdiction (lighter shade denotes claimed but not controlled areas)
- Area: 59,146 km^{2}
- Population: 274,289
- Legal jurisdiction: Ladakh
- Governing body: Government of India
- General nature: Local civilian police

Operational structure
- Headquarters: Leh; Kargil
- Elected officer responsible: Amit Shah, Minister of Home Affairs
- Agency executive: Anand Jain ,(IPS), Director General of Police
- Parent agency: Ministry of Home Affairs, Government of India

Website
- http://police.ladakh.gov.in/

Ladakh Police is the police agency responsible for law enforcement and investigations within the Union territory of Ladakh, India. It came into existence on 31 October 2019.

== History ==
The union territory of Ladakh was formed on 31 October as a result of provisions contained within the Jammu and Kashmir Reorganisation Act, 2019. The region was previously part of the state of Jammu and Kashmir and policing was the responsibility of the Jammu and Kashmir Police. A new organisation for the police force of Ladakh was created as part of the reorganisation.

== Organizational structure ==
Ladakh Police is under the direct control of Department of Home Affairs, Government of India. It is headed by Director General of Police (DGP).
