= 19th Kushok Bakula Rinpoche =

Buddhist lama

His Holiness 19th Kushok Bakula Rinpoche
- Title: 19th Kushok Bakula Rinpoche

Personal life
- Born: 27 May 1918 Royal Palace of Matho
- Died: 4 November 2003 (aged 85) Saket, New Delhi

Religious life
- Religion: Tibetan Buddhism

Senior posting
- Period in office: 21 May 1917 – 4 November 2003
- Predecessor: 18th Bakula Rinpoche
- Successor: 20th Kushok Bakula Rinpoche

Ngawang Lobzang Thupstan Chognor (Tibetan: ངག་དབང་བློ་བཟང་ཐུབ་བསྟན་མཆོག་ནོར, Wylie: ngag dbang blo bzang thub bstan mchog nor), commonly known as 19th Kushok Bakula Rinpoche (19 May 1918 – 4 November 2003) was an Indian Buddhist lama, who also served as India's ambassador to Mongolia. He is mainly known for his efforts in reviving Buddhism in Mongolia and Russia by linking them with the community of Tibetan exiles in India.

He was born in the Matho branch of the Royal House of Ladakh, India. He was the youngest child of his father, Nangwa Thayas, the King of Matho, and his wife, Princess Yeshes Wangmo of the Royal House of Zangla. He was recognised by the Thirteenth Dalai Lama as a reincarnation of Bakula Arhat, one of the Sixteen Arhats who in legend were direct disciples of Gautama Buddha. He was a direct descendant of the last King of Ladakh Tsepel Tondup Namgyal. He was, in fact, his great-great-great grandson.

"In 1962 ... allowed the Indian troops to convert a section of his Pethub Monastery into a makeshift military hospital. When a section of people in Kashmir demanded plebiscite, Rinpoche categorically stated that Ladakh would never go to Pakistan and would remain with India."

Later he served in the Parliament of India, and was deeply engaged with welfare, education and rights of the Scheduled Castes and Scheduled Tribes of India. From January 1990 to October 2000, he was India's Ambassador in Mongolia. He was awarded the Padma Bhushan in 1988. The airport at Leh in the Indian region of Ladakh is named after him.
