= LAHDC, Nubra =

Autonomous administrative division in Ladakh, India

Ladakh Autonomous Hill Development Council, Nubra

Type
- Type: Autonomous District Council of the Nubra district
- Seats: 9 Councillors

Elections
- Voting system: 9 plurality voting
- Last election: New
- Next election: 4 December 2026

Meeting place
- Diskit, Ladakh

Ladakh Autonomous Hill Development Council, Nubra (LAHDC Nubra), is an Autonomous District Council in Ladakh. LAHDC Nubra administers the Nubra district of Ladakh, India.

== History ==
It is created in 2026 through the expansion of LAHDC across all districts in Ladakh.
