= LAHDC, Changthang =

Autonomous administrative division in Ladakh, India

Ladakh Autonomous Hill Development Council, Changthang

Type
- Type: Autonomous District Council of the Changthang district
- Seats: 10 Councillors

Elections
- Voting system: 10 plurality voting
- Last election: New
- Next election: 4 December 2026

Meeting place
- Nyoma, Ladakh

Ladakh Autonomous Hill Development Council, Changthang (LAHDC Changthang), is an Autonomous District Council in Ladakh. LAHDC Changthang administers the Changthang district of Ladakh, India.

== History ==
It is created in 2026 through the expansion of LAHDC across all districts in Ladakh.
