= LAHDC, Drass =

Autonomous administrative division in Ladakh, India

Ladakh Autonomous Hill Development Council, Drass

Type
- Type: Autonomous District Council of the Drass district
- Seats: 7 Councillors

Elections
- Voting system: 7 plurality voting
- Last election: New
- Next election: 4 December 2026

Meeting place
- Drass-Ranbirpura, Ladakh

Ladakh Autonomous Hill Development Council, Drass (LAHDC Drass), is an Autonomous District Council in Ladakh. LAHDC Drass administers the Drass district of Ladakh, India.

== History ==
It is created in 2026 through the expansion of LAHDC across all districts in Ladakh.
