= LAHDC, Kargil =

Territorial council in India

Ladakh Autonomous Hill Development Council, Kargil

Type
- Type: Autonomous District Council of the Kargil district
- Seats: 21 Councillors

Elections
- Voting system: 21 plurality voting
- Last election: 4 October 2023
- Next election: 4 December 2026

Meeting place
- Kargil, Ladakh

Website
- kargil.nic.in/lahdc/

Ladakh Autonomous Hill Development Council, Kargil (LAHDC Kargil), is an Autonomous District Council in Ladakh. LAHDC Kargil administers the Kargil District of Ladakh, India.

== History ==
In October 1993, the central Government of India and the state Government of Jammu and Kashmir agreed to grant each district of Ladakh the status of Autonomous Hill Council. This agreement was given effect by the Ladakh Autonomous Hill Development Council Act, 1995. A hill council for Leh district was formed in 1995 and the council for Kargil district was formed in 2003.

== Powers ==
The autonomous hill councils work with village panchayats to take decisions on economic development, healthcare, education, land use, taxation, and local governance which are further reviewed at the block headquarters in the presence of the chief executive councillor and executive councillors. The Ladakh Police continues to look after law and order while Administration of Ladakh looks after the judicial system, communications and the higher education in the districts.

== Electoral history ==
Election	Year						CEC
Election	Year	JKNC	INC	BJP	JKPDP	IND	CEC
1st LAHDC	2003			0	0		
2nd LAHDC	2008	18	8	0	0	0	JKNC
3rd LAHDC	2013	8	10	0	0	8	INC+ JKNC
4th LAHDC	2018	10	8	1	2	5	JKNC +INC
5th LAHDC	2023	12	10	2	0	2	JKNC +INC

== See also ==
- Ladakh Autonomous Hill Development Council, Leh
- List of districts of Ladakh
- Geography of Ladakh
