= LAHDC, Leh =

Autonomous administrative division in Ladakh, India

Ladakh Autonomous Hill Development Council, Leh

Type
- Type: Autonomous District Council of the Leh district
- Seats: 22 Councillors

Elections
- Voting system: 22 plurality voting
- Last election: 26 October 2020
- Next election: 4 December 2026

Meeting place
- Leh, Ladakh

Website
- leh.nic.in/lahdcleh/

The Ladakh Autonomous Hill Development Council, Leh (LAHDC Leh) an Autonomous District Council in Ladakh. LAHDC Leh administers the Leh district of Ladakh, India.

== History ==
The council was created under the Ladakh Autonomous Hill Development Council Act 1995, following demands of Ladakhi people to make Leh District a new Indian Union Territory because of its religious and cultural differences with the rest of Jammu and Kashmir. In October 1993, the Indian Union Government and the Jammu and Kashmir State Government agreed to grant Ladakh the status of Autonomous Hill Council.

The council came into being with the holding of elections on 28 August 1995. The inaugural meeting of the council was held at Leh on 3 September 1995. An Autonomous Hill Council has also been established in neighboring Kargil District. The Hill Council in Kargil came in to existence in July 2003.

In 2003, as part of its "healing touch policy", the J&K government announced popular elections for the Autonomous Hill Development Council in Kargil, which was meant to strengthen participatory forms of development, governance and democratic state-building in the war-ravaged district.

== Powers ==
The autonomous hill councils work with village panchayats to take decisions on economic development, healthcare, education, land use, taxation, and local governance which are further reviewed at the block headquarters in the presence of the chief executive councillor and executive councillors. The administration of Union Territory of Ladakh looks after law and order, communications and the higher education in the districts.

== Electoral history ==
Election	Year						CEC
Election	Year	BJP	INC	JKNC	LUTF	IND	CEC
1st LAHDC	1995	0	26	0	0	0	INC
2nd LAHDC	2000	0	20	5	0	1	INC
3rd LAHDC	2005	0	1	0	24	1	LUTF
4th LAHDC	2010	4	22	0	0	0	INC
5th LAHDC	2015	18	5	2	0	1	BJP
6th LAHDC	2020	15	9	0	0	2	BJP

== Vision 2025 ==
On 8 May 2013 mutual collaboration for sustainable development in Ladakh in the tune with Ladakh Vision Document 2025 was jointly organised by LAHDC and NABARD at Sindhu Sanskriti Kendra in Leh. The workshop-cum-discussion session was inaugurated by the then Chief Executive Councillor of Ladakh Autonomous Hill Development Council, Rigzin Spalbar by lighting up the lamp in the presence of Executive Councillors.

In his introductory speech, Rigzin Spalbar talked about Ladakh Vision Document 2025 which was prepared in 2005 by a committee of 20 members headed by Sonam Dawa, former Chief Engineer and Advisor of Ladakh Ecological Development Group. These members belonging to different fields of expertise had put a great effort in the conceptualisation of the Vision Document. CEC took the opportunity to felicitate them at the function with a traditional scarf and a memento.

== See also ==
- LAHDC, Zanskar
- Ladakh Autonomous Hill Development Council, Kargil
- List of districts of Ladakh
- Geography of Ladakh
