= Bible translations into Tibetan =

The first portion of the Bible, the Gospel of John, in a Tibetic language was translated by Moravian Church missionaries William Heyde, Edward Pagel, and Heinrich August Jäschke, and later Dr. August Francke. It was printed in 1862 at Kyelang capital of Lahul in Kashmir. The whole New Testament was printed in 1885 in Ladakh. Another version was translated in 1903. So as not to have the problem of various dialectal differences it was translated into classical Tibetan, but this was not understood by most people. Yoseb Gergen (a.k.a. Sonam Gergen), a Tibetan Christian translated the entire Bible, complete in 1935. This version was translated into a dialect of Tibetan Gergen had accidentally stumbled across, and which was understandable by all Tibetans. It was finally published in 1948. This is known in India as the Tibetan OV Bible. Eliya Tsetan Phuntshog published a New Testament in 1970. There is currently a project going on to translate the Bible into the East Tibetan dialect.

== Dialectal and register variation ==
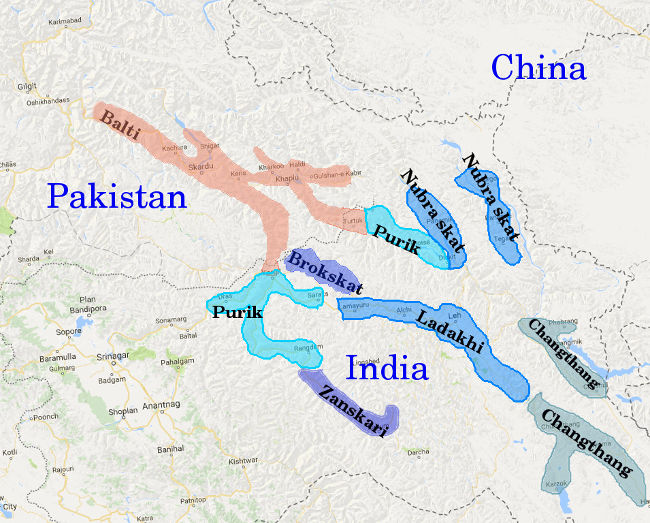
Western Tibetan languages

Recent research has shown there are approximately 50 Tibetan languages which branch into more than 200 varieties.

The complex task of translating the scriptures into the different varieties of Tibetan is made more difficult by the need to choose between different linguistic registers. These are: the high literary register (the language used for the Tibetan Buddhist scriptures, also known as ཆོས་སྐད chos skad); the mid literary register (a mixture of high literary and some known common spoken and non-spoken words); and one of many varieties of the low register (the vernacular/spoken language), which are specific to particular regions.

There are advantages and disadvantages of translating into each different register. A translation into one of the varieties of the low register will be easily understood in one specific region but its geographical reach will be limited, and it will be seen as less prestigious than the high and mid registers. Mid Literary is more difficult to understand than the spoken language but has a wider geographical reach. The high literary register can reach even further geographically but it requires people first to learn a literary language in order to understand what is written in it.

== History ==
The Moravian missionary H. A. Jäschke (1817–1883) spent three months in Ladakh in 1857, and subsequently worked in Keylong (Lahul) until 1868. He studied the spoken languages of the region. However, he decided to translate the New Testament into Classical Tibetan, drawing on the assistance and advice of speakers and scholars of different forms of Tibetan in both the Western Himalayan region and Darjeeling. He hoped that his choice of language would ensure that the written text would be widely understood across Tibet and the Himalayan border regions.

Jäschke's successor F. A. Redslob (1838–1891) completed the translation of the New Testament in 1885. Between 1898 and 1902, a committee chaired by another Moravian missionary A. W. Heyde (1825–1907) prepared a revised version of the Tibetan New Testament under the sponsorship of the British and Foreign Bible Society. Later, Dr A. H. Francke (1870–1930) and his Ladakhi colleague Yoseb Gergan (1878–1946) translated the Old Testament into Classical Tibetan. The draft translation of the Old Testament was completed by 1935, but the full Tibetan Bible was not published until 1948.

In 1959, Eliyah Tsetan Phuntsog (son-in-law of Yoseb Gergan) started to revise the New Testament with Pierre Vittoz (a Swiss missionary). They translated it into a Mid Literary register, hoping that this would be accessible to the various Tibetan-speaking peoples in both India and Tibet. This version was published in 1970. However, most of the Ladakhis who were not trained in the Literary register found all these versions difficult to understand.

In 2011, a Tibetan Old Testament (TOT11) was completed, attributed to the Nepal Bible Society.

A translation of the New Testament into modern "low literary" Tibetan, often called the Central Tibetan Bible (CTB), and released in 2018 under the subheading ༄༅།།འཛམ་གླིང་མཐའ་གྲུ་གསལ་བའི་འོད་སྣང་། (Wylie: 'dzam gling mtha' gru gsal ba'i 'od snang) "Radiant Light to the Ends of the Earth", and printed by Central Asia Publishing, as well as being available digitally. The rights to the Bible are held by the Wycliffe Bible Translators.

In 2019, a translation of the New Testament was released as the New Tibetan Bible (NTB) in a form of literary Tibetan, available digitally. Rights to this are also held by the Wycliffe Bible Translators.

== Translations into Ladakhi ==
Ladakhi is a language spoken in India in regions bordering both China and Pakistan; its neighbouring languages are Purik, Balti, Zanskari, Nubra, and the more divergent Changthang (see map). All these languages are part of the Western Tibetan language grouping and quite distinct from the Central, Amdo and Khams Tibetan spoken varieties.

Alongside his main Tibetan translation work, Jäschke translated the Harmony of the Gospels, a selection of texts used by the Moravian church in Easter Week, into vernacular Ladakhi. He noticed that the Ladakhi Christians were more attentive when listening to the Harmony, than they were when they heard texts written in the High Register of Classical Tibetan.

Like Jäschke, Francke put his main efforts into Bible translation into literary Tibetan. However, he also emphasised the need to translate at least some portions of the Bible into the spoken languages of the region. In 1907, he printed a revised version of Jäschke's Harmony. He also prepared a Ladakhi Life of Christ, and in 1908, he published a Ladakhi version of Mark's Gospel. Yoseb Gergan produced a revised version of the Ladakhi St Mark, and this was published at Lahore in 1919.

These early vernacular translations adapted the classical literary spelling system rather than using a phonetic transcription of spoken Ladakhi. In the early 1950s, E. T. Phuntsog experimented with a greatly simplified spelling system for writing Ladakhi. However, he ran into opposition from a segment of the Ladakhi community who wanted to preserve the classical spelling system of the Buddhist Scriptures. Phuntsog translated excerpts from the Gospels of St Mark and St Luke using this script. However, his proposals were never accepted outside the small Christian community, and he was forced to put them on one side.

Today there is an ongoing project to translate the complete Bible into the low register of spoken Ladakhi (Zhung/Leh dialect) using a more phonemic spelling structure. Currently the New Testament and Genesis 1-16 have been completed.
