= Shamskat =

Tibetic language spoken in Ladakh, India

- གཤམ་སྐད་ sham skat
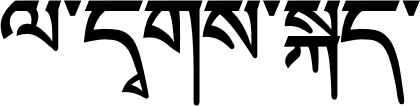
- Native to: India
- Region: Ladakh
- Ethnicity: Ladakhis
- Language family: Sino-Tibetan: Tibeto-Kanauri; Bodish; Tibetic; Ladakhi–Balti; Ladakhi; Shamskat
- Writing system: Tibetan script

Language codes
- ISO 639-3: –
- Glottolog: sham1264
- Ladakhi is classified as Vulnerable by the UNESCO Atlas of the World's Languages in Danger

The Shamskat dialect (Ladakhi: གཤམ་སྐད) of the Ladakhi language is spoken in the Sham region of Ladakh, a region administered by India as a union territory. Along the Indus, there is a clear geographical boundary between two dialects of Shamskat and Kenskat. Nimo, the first village of Shamskat speakers, lies in the sharply cut basin near the narrow gorge of Indus river. It is the predominant language in the west of the Buddhist-dominated district of Leh. Shamskat pronunciation resembles that of Old Tibetan. Shamskat retains its Classical Tibetan vocabulary, while the Balti and Purgi have little influence from the vocabulary of its neighbour Shina. The native speakers of these languages are called Shamma.

== Pronunciation ==
Shamskat is usually written using Tibetan script, with the pronunciation being much closer to written Classical Tibetan than most other Tibetic languages. Shamskat pronounces many of the prefix, suffix and head letters that are silent in many other Tibetic languages, in particular Central Tibetan.
