= Ladakhi =

Ladakhi can mean:

- of, from, or related to Ladakh, a union territory in northern India
- Ladakhi language, the Tibetic language spoken there
- Ladakhis, the natives of Ladakh
