= Tibetans in India =

རྒྱ་གར་ནང་གི་བོད་མི།
- Flag of Tibet and the Tibetan people

Total population
- 83,799

Languages
- Tibetic languages and Hindi

Religion
- Buddhism, minority Bon, Islam

Related ethnic groups
- Sherpa, Bhotia, Lepcha, Tamang, Gurung, Ladakhi, Ngalop, Sharchop, and other Sino-Tibetan people

Tibetans in India constitute one of the largest Tibetan exile communities in the world. Following the 1959 Tibetan uprising against Chinese rule, the 14th Dalai Lama and thousands of Tibetans sought refuge in India. Since then, India has remained the primary host for Tibetan exiles, providing them with asylum and settlement opportunities. The Tibetan government-in-exile, known as the Central Tibetan Administration, operates from Dharamshala in Himachal Pradesh.

== Background ==
The Tibetan presence in India dates back centuries, given the special relation both share due to Buddhism, but the modern migration began in 1959, when the 14th Dalai Lama and thousands of Tibetans fled Tibet after the Chinese government suppressed the Lhasa Uprising. The Government of India, led by Prime Minister Jawaharlal Nehru, granted asylum to the Dalai Lama and his followers, allowing them to establish the Tibetan Government-in-Exile in Dharamshala, Himachal Pradesh.

Between 1959 and 1963, around 80,000 Tibetans settled in India, with the Indian government providing land for their rehabilitation in states such as Himachal Pradesh, Karnataka, Arunachal Pradesh, and Uttarakhand. Subsequent waves of Tibetan refugees arrived during the Cultural Revolution (1966–1976) and later in the 1980s and 1990s due to continued repression in Tibet.

== Settlements ==
Tibetans in India primarily reside in over 35 designated settlements across various states. The largest Tibetan communities are found in:

- Dharamshala, Himachal Pradesh – Headquarters of the Tibetan Government-in-Exile and home to the Dalai Lama.
- Bylakuppe, Karnataka – One of the largest Tibetan settlements, home to several monasteries and institutions.
- Mundgod, Karnataka – A major settlement with monastic centers.
- Majnu-ka-tilla, Delhi – A well-known Tibetan refugee colony in India's capital.

The 2011 census of India recorded 83,799 Tibetans in India.

The settlements outside Indian Himalayan Region falls in Karnataka, Maharashtra (Bhandara), Odisha (Chandragiri), Chhattisgarh (Mainpat) and Delhi.

== Legal status ==
Tibetans in India hold a unique legal status. While they are not Indian citizens, they are issued Identity Certificates by the Indian government, which function as travel documents. Until recently, Tibetans faced challenges in obtaining Indian passports, but a 2017 Delhi High Court ruling allowed Tibetans born in India between 1950 and 1987 to claim Indian citizenship under the Citizenship Act of 1955. However, many Tibetans remain stateless, as acquiring Indian citizenship requires them to relinquish their refugee benefits.

== Culture and religion ==
Tibetans in India have preserved their cultural and religious traditions. Tibetan Buddhism plays a central role in community life, with major monasteries such as Namdroling Monastery in Karnataka and Tawang Monastery in Arunachal Pradesh serving as cultural hubs. Institutions such as the Library of Tibetan Works and Archives in Dharamshala work to preserve Tibetan literature, history, and philosophy.

Losar (Tibetan New Year) and the Dalai Lama’s birthday are widely celebrated in Tibetan settlements. Traditional Tibetan arts, including Thangka painting and opera, are also maintained through community efforts and educational programs.

== Language ==
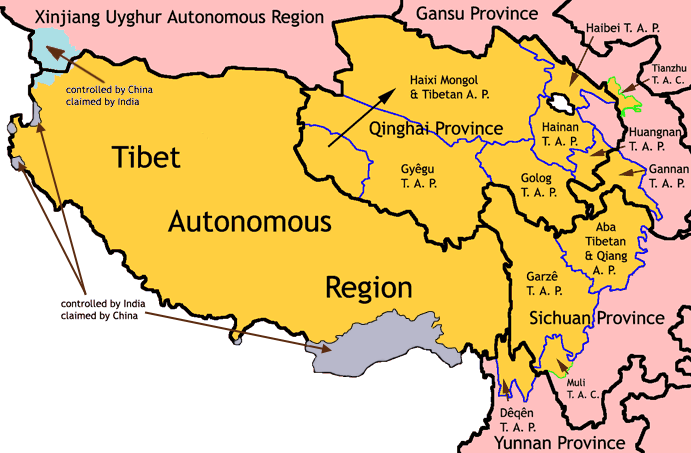
Areas in which concentrations of ethnic Tibetans live within China

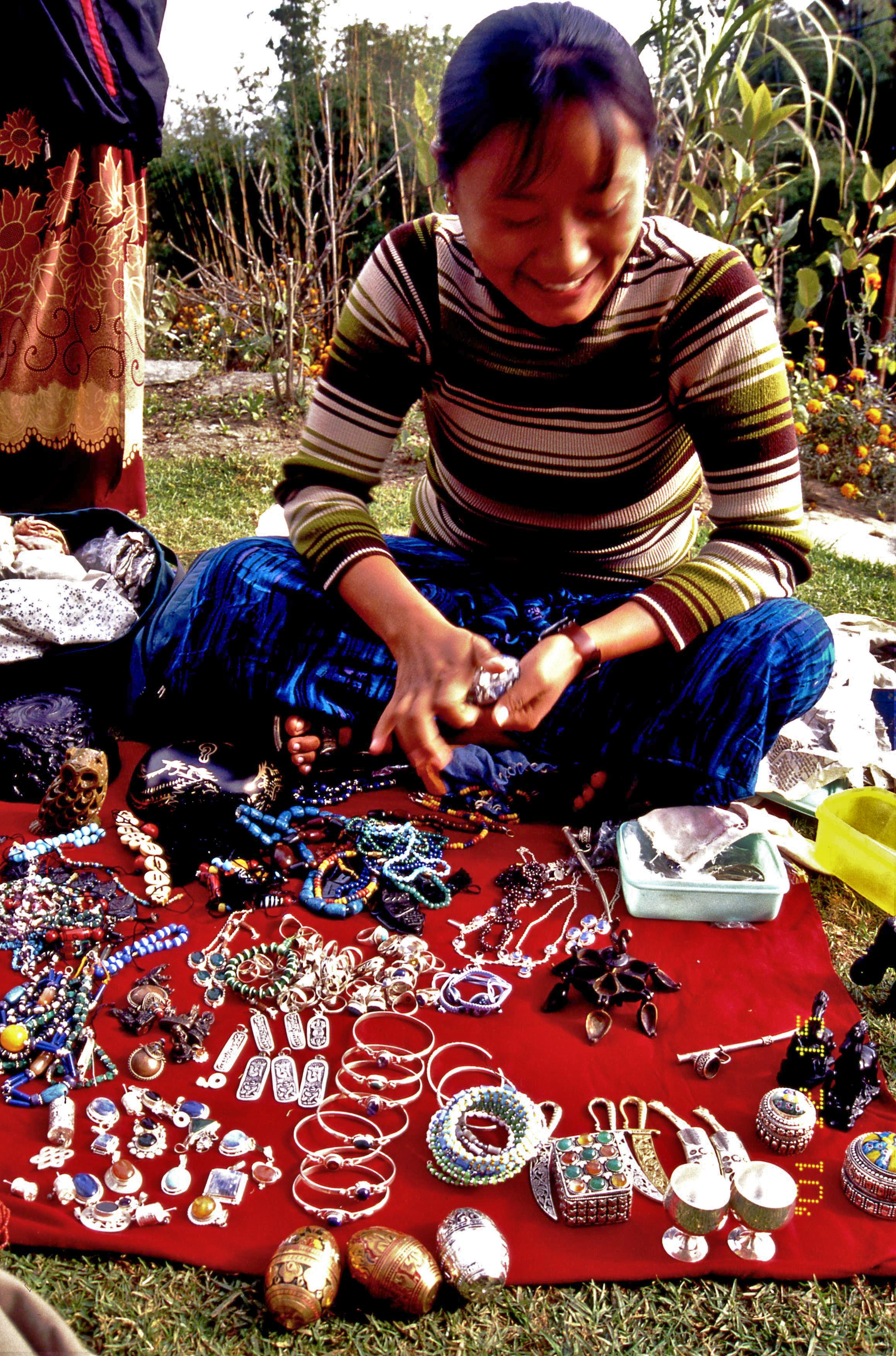
Tibetan peddler living in Nepal

The Tibetic languages (Tibetan: བོད་སྐད།) are a cluster of mutually unintelligible Sino-Tibetan languages spoken by approximately 8 million people, primarily Tibetan, living across a wide area of East and South Asia, including the Tibetan Plateau and Baltistan, Ladakh, Nepal, Sikkim, and Bhutan. Classical Tibetan is a major regional literary language, particularly for its use in Buddhist literature. The Central Tibetan language (the dialects of Ü-Tsang, including Lhasa), Khams Tibetan, and Amdo Tibetan are generally considered to be dialects of a single language, especially since they all share the same literary language, while Dzongkha, Sikkimese, Sherpa, Jirel, and Ladakhi are considered to be separate languages.

== Economy and education ==
Many Tibetans in India are engaged in handicrafts, agriculture, and small businesses. The Carpet weaving industry, in particular, is a significant source of income for Tibetan refugees. Others operate restaurants, hotels, and travel businesses catering to tourists interested in Tibetan culture.

Education has been a major focus of the Tibetan exile community. The Central Tibetan School Administration, set up in 1961, oversees schools dedicated to Tibetan children’s education. The Dalai Lama Institute for Higher Education and the Sarah College for Higher Tibetan Studies provide higher education opportunities.

== See also ==
- Ladakhi people
- Sikkimese people
