= Tibetans =

East Asian ethnic group

བོད་པ་
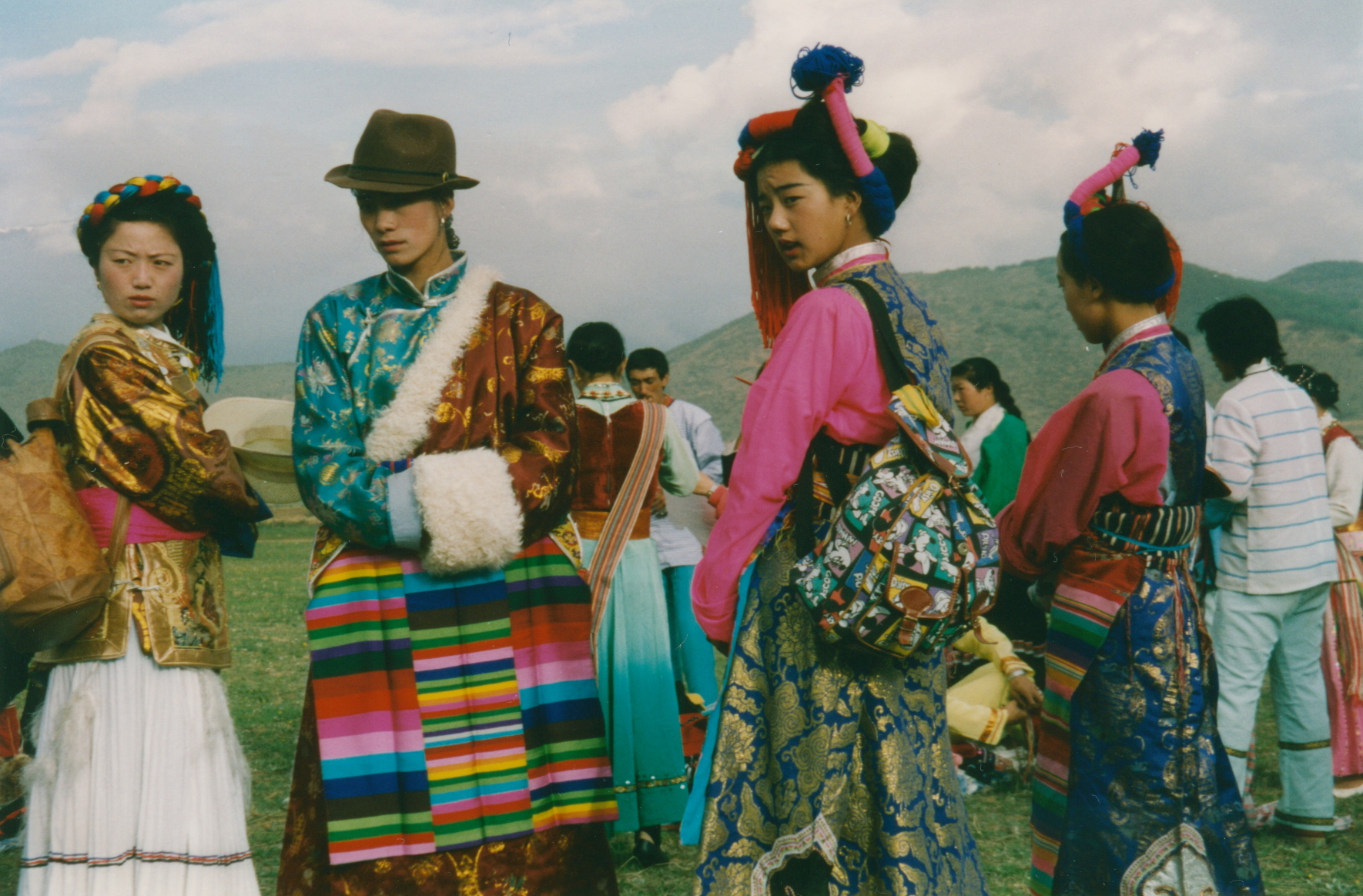
- Tibetan people in Shangri-La for the annual Horse Racing Festival.

Total population
- c. 7.7 million

Regions with significant populations
- China: 7,060,731 (2020 census)
- India: 83,779
- Nepal: 20,000–40,000
- United States: 26,700
- Canada: 9,350
- Switzerland: 8,000
- France: 8,000
- Bhutan: 5,000
- Belgium: 5,000
- Australia: 1,600
- Netherlands: 1,100
- United Kingdom: 700
- Taiwan: 649
- Liechtenstein: 500
- New Zealand: 129

Languages
- Tibetan languages and Chinese language

Religion
- Predominantly Tibetan Buddhist sect of Vajrayana Buddhism; minorities of Bon (significant), Islam and Christianity

Related ethnic groups
- Sherpa · Jirel · Rai · Tamang · Lhoba · Monpa · Gurung · Magar · Limbu · Qiang · Ngalop · Sharchop · Ladakhis · Baltis · Burig · Kachin · Yi · Bamar · Other Tibeto-Burman-speaking peoples

Tibetans

Tibetan name
- Tibetan: བོད་པ་
Transcriptions
- Wylie: bod pa
- THL: bö pa

Chinese name
- Chinese: 藏族
- Literal meaning: Tsang nationality
Transcriptions
Standard Mandarin
- Hanyu Pinyin: Zàngzú
Wu
- Romanization: zaon zoh
Hakka
- Romanization: Tshông-tshu̍k
Yue: Cantonese
- Jyutping: zong^{6} zuk^{6}
Southern Min
- Hokkien POJ: Chōng-cho̍k
- Teochew Peng'im: Tsăng-tsôk
Eastern Min
- Fuzhou BUC: Câung-cŭk

Chinese endonym
- Chinese: 博巴
Transcriptions
Standard Mandarin
- Hanyu Pinyin: Bóbā

Tibetans (Tibetan: བོད་པ་, Wylie: bod pa, THL: bö pa) are an East Asian ethnic group native to Tibet. Their current population is estimated to be around 7.7 million. In addition to the majority living in the Tibet Autonomous Region of China, significant numbers of Tibetans live in the Chinese provinces of Gansu, Qinghai, Sichuan, and Yunnan, as well as in India, Nepal, and Bhutan.

The Tibetic languages are a branch of the Tibeto-Burman language family. The traditional or mythological explanation of the Tibetan people's origin is that they are the descendants of the human Pha Trelgen Changchup Sempa and rock ogress Ma Drag Sinmo. Most Tibeto-Burman speakers in southwest China, including Tibetans, are thought to be direct descendants of the ancient Qiang people.

Most Tibetans practice Tibetan Buddhism, although a significant minority observe the Indigenous Bon religion. Smaller communities of Tibetan Muslims and Christians also exist. Tibetan Buddhism influences Tibetan art, drama, and architecture, while Tibet's harsh geography has produced an adaptive culture of Tibetan medicine and cuisine.

== Demographics ==
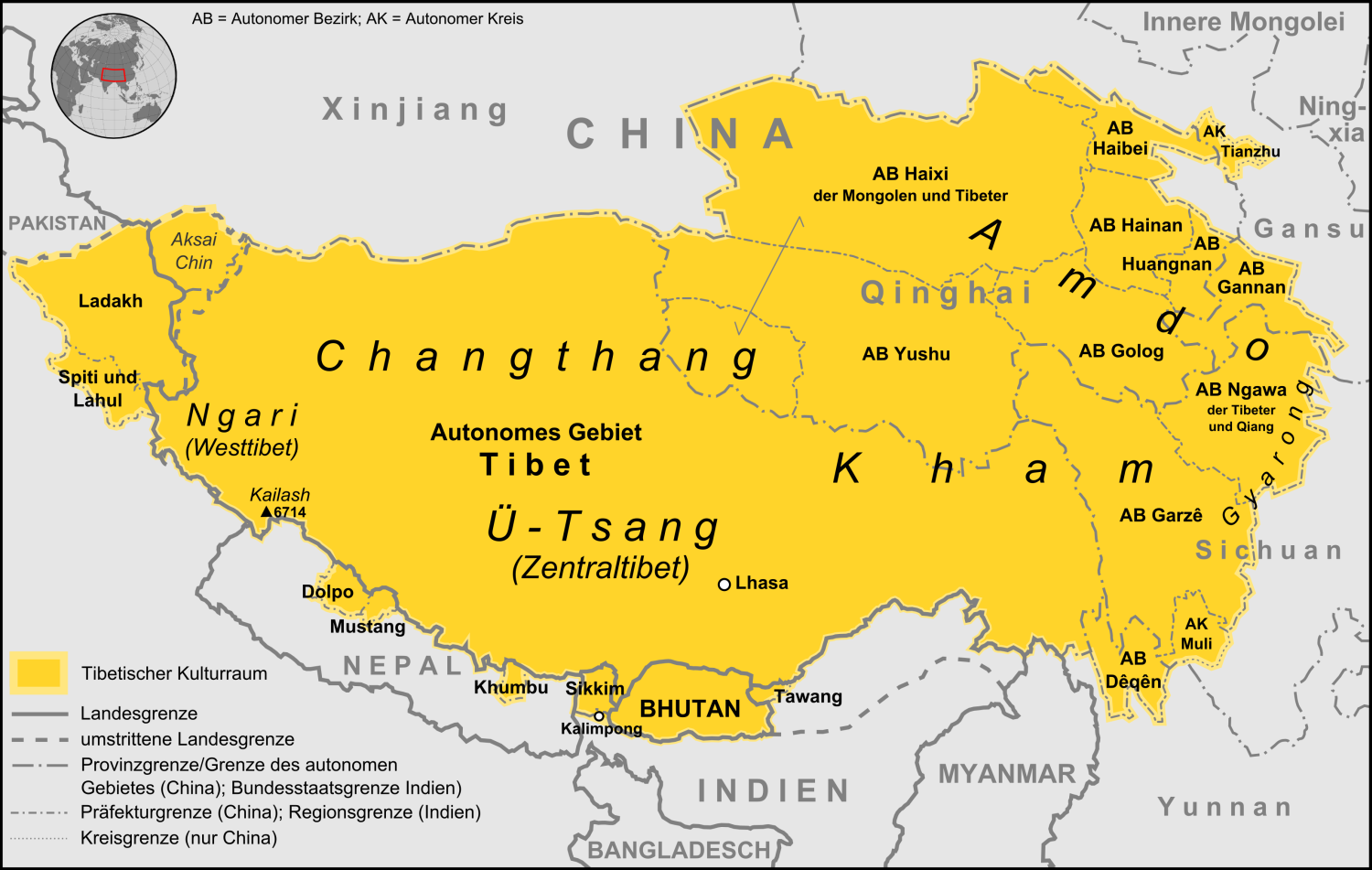
Tibetan cultural sphere, showing the traditional Tibetan regions of Ü-Tsang, Kham, Amdo, Ngari, and others.

As of the 2014 census, there are about 6 million Tibetans living in the Tibet Autonomous Region and the 10 Tibetan autonomous prefectures in the provinces of Gansu, Qinghai, Sichuan, and Yunnan. The SIL Ethnologue in 2009 documents an additional 189,000 Tibetic speakers living in India, 5,280 in Nepal and 4,800 in Bhutan. The Central Tibetan Administration's (CTA) Green Book (of the Tibetan Government in Exile) counts 145,150 Tibetans outside Tibet: a little over 100,000 in India; over 16,000 in Nepal; over 1,800 in Bhutan, and over 25,000 in other parts of the world. There are Tibetan communities in the United States, Australia, Brazil, Canada, Costa Rica, France, Mexico, Norway, Mongolia, Germany, Switzerland, and the United Kingdom. In the Baltistan region of Northern Pakistan, the Balti people are a Muslim ethnicity of Tibetan descent numbering around 300,000.

There is some dispute over the current and historical number of Tibetans. The Central Tibetan Administration claims that the 5.4 million number is a decrease from 6.3 million in 1959 while the Chinese government claims that it is an increase from 2.7 million in 1954. However, the question depends on the definition and extent of "Tibet"; the region claimed by the CTA is more expansive and China more diminutive. Also, the Tibetan administration did not take a formal census of its territory in the 1950s; the numbers provided by the administration at the time were "based on informed guesswork".

=== In China ===
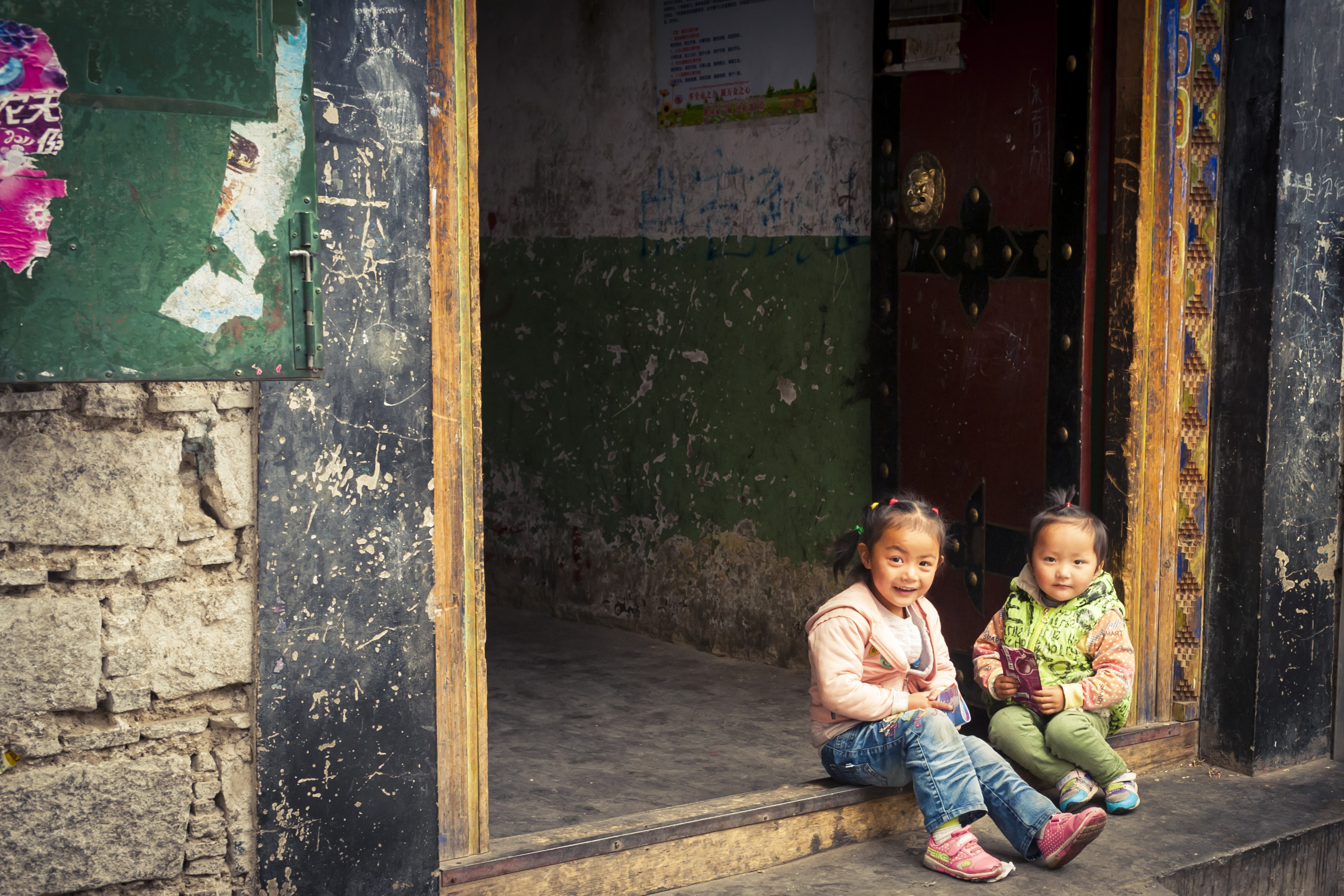
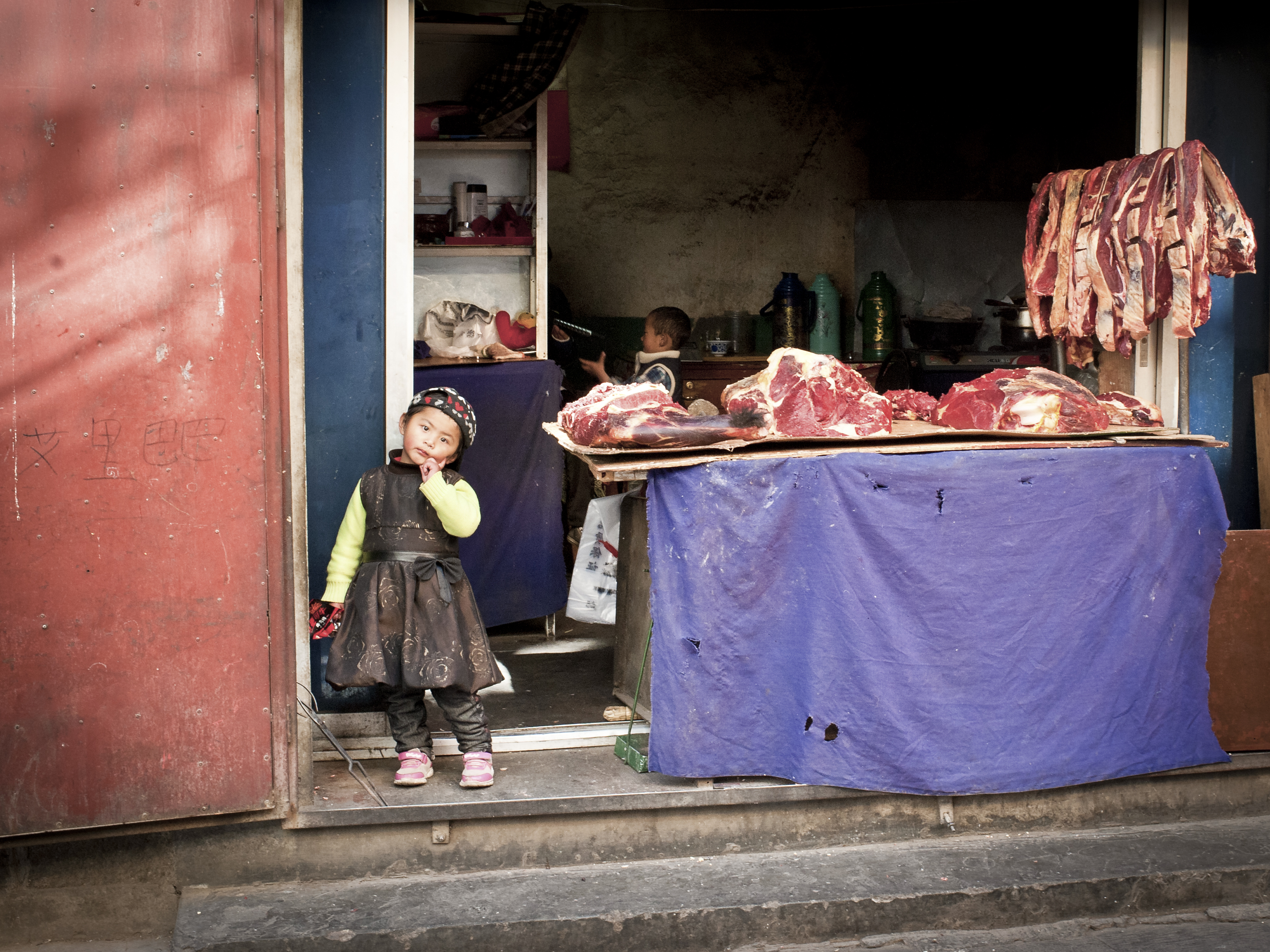
Children in Lhasa, Tibet

According to the Sixth National Population Census of the People's Republic of China (2010), there are 6,282,187 Tibetans nationwide:

There are 2,716,388 people in the Tibet Autonomous Region, 1,496,524 people in Sichuan Province, 1,375,059 people in Qinghai Province, 488,359 people in Gansu Province (mostly in Gannan Tibetan Autonomous Prefecture and Bairi Tibetan Autonomous County) and 142,257 people in Yunnan Province (mostly in Diqing Tibetan Autonomous Prefecture). Tibetans account for 0.47% of the total population of the country. Tibetans account for 90.48% of the total population in Tibet Region, 24.44% of the total population of Qinghai and 1.86% of the total population in Sichuan. Of all Tibetans in China, 315,622 people live in cities, 923,177 in towns, and 5,043,388 people (80.3%) live in rural areas.

According to the Seventh Census of 2020, there are 7,060,700 Tibetans living within China. Of the resident population of the Tibet Autonomous Region, 3,204,700 were Tibetans and other ethnic minorities, of whom 3,137,900 were Tibetans, an increase of 421,500, or 15.52%, over 2010, with an average annual growth rate of 1.45%; 66,800 were other ethnic minorities, an increase of 26,300, or 64.95%, over 2010, with an average annual growth rate of 5.13%; and 6,680 were other ethnic minorities, an increase of 26,300, or 64.95%, over 2010, with an average annual growth rate of 5.13%. The average annual growth rate was 5.13%.

There are one region, ten prefectures, and two counties officially established by the government: the Tibet Autonomous Region (TAR), Qinghai Province (Haibei Tibetan Autonomous Prefecture, Hainan Tibetan Autonomous Prefecture, Huangnan Tibetan Autonomous Prefecture, Guoluo Tibetan Autonomous Prefecture, Yushu Tibetan Autonomous Prefecture, and Haixi Mongol and Tibetan Autonomous Prefecture), Sichuan Province (Aba Tibetan and Qiang Autonomous Prefecture, Garzê Tibetan Autonomous Prefecture, and Muli Tibetan Autonomous County), Gansu Province (Gannan Tibetan Autonomous Prefecture and Bairi Tibetan Autonomous County), and Yunnan Province (Diqing Tibetan Autonomous Prefecture).

=== In India ===
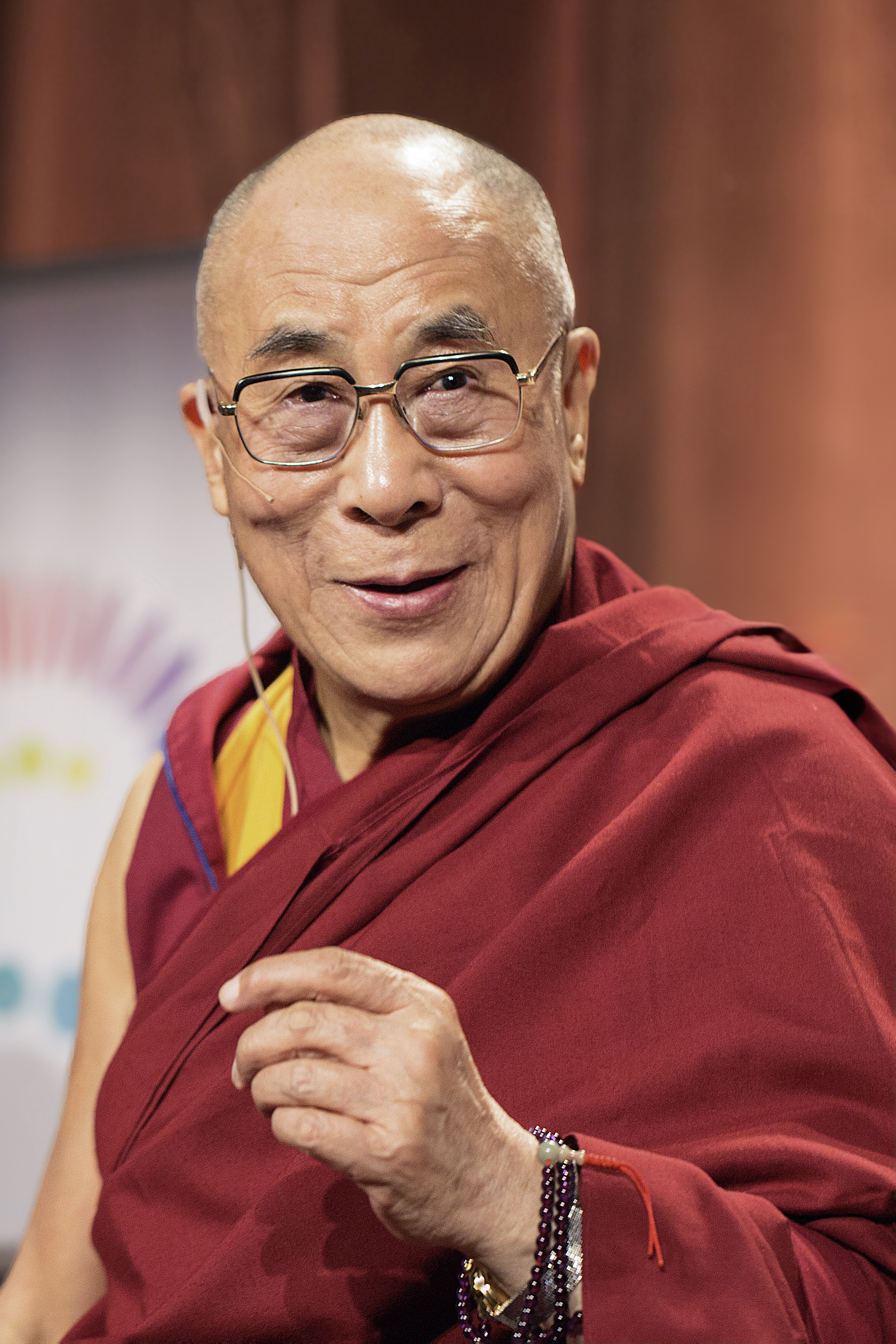
The incumbent Dalai Lama, the highest spiritual leader of Tibetan Buddhism, lives in exile in India.

There are also nearly 100,000 Tibetans living in exile in India since 1959, the majority of them living in Tibetan enclaves such as Dharamshala and Bylakuppe.

In 2011, the Indian government reported 150,000 Tibetan diaspora residing in India. In 2019, the number of Tibetan diaspora in India declined to 85,000.

In India, non-Tibetan Tibetic people are found in the regions of Ladakh (Ladakhi and Balti), Kinnaur district in Himachal Pradesh, Spiti valley, Uttarakhand (Bhotiya), Sikkim (Bhutia), and Arunachal Pradesh (Khamba, Lhoba, and Monpa people).

=== In Nepal ===
Geographic distribution of Tibetic languages of Nepal.

Tibetans are known as Bhotiyas in Nepal, where they are majority in the valleys of the Himalaya such as Upper Mustang, Upper Dolpo, Walung region, Limi and Muchu valleys. Nepal is also home to other Tibetic people such as the Sherpa, Jirel, and Hyolmo .There are also more than 10,000 Tibetan refugees in Nepal.

== Language ==
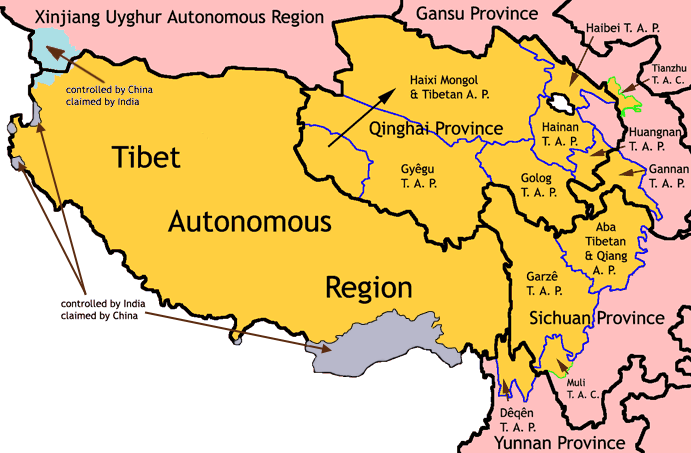
Areas in which concentrations of ethnic Tibetans live within China

The Tibetic languages (Tibetan: བོད་སྐད།) are a cluster of mutually unintelligible Sino-Tibetan languages spoken by approximately 8 million people, primarily Tibetan, living across a wide area of East and South Asia, including the Tibetan Plateau and Baltistan, Ladakh, Nepal, Sikkim, and Bhutan. Classical Tibetan is a major regional literary language, particularly for its use in Buddhist literature. The Central Tibetan language (the dialects of Ü-Tsang, including Lhasa), Khams Tibetan, and Amdo Tibetan are generally considered to be dialects of a single language, especially since they all share the same literary language, while Dzongkha, Sikkimese, Sherpa, Jirel, and Ladakhi are generally considered to be separate languages.

There are also groups whose mother languages are non-Tibetic Tibeto-Burman languages, but still classified as ethnic Tibetans by China:

- Gyalrong people speaking Gyalrongic languages
- Baima people speaking Baima language
- Guiqiong people speaking Guiqiong language
- Namuyi people speaking Namuyi language
- Shixing people speaking Shixing language
- Northern Pumi language speakers speaking Northern Pumi language
- Pemako Tibetans speaking Tshangla language

There are also people who are considered ethnic Tibetans whose mother language is Chinese language, including the 14th Dalai Lama and his family.

== Ethnic origins ==
The ethnic roots of Tibetans can be traced back to a deep Eastern Asian lineage representing the indigenous population of the Tibetan plateau since c. 40,000 to 30,000 years ago, and arriving Neolithic farmers from the Yellow River within the last 10,000 years, and which can be associated with having introduced the Sino-Tibetan languages.

=== Genetics ===
Modern Tibetan populations are genetically most similar to other East Asian populations, Bhutanese, as well as other Sino-Tibetan-speaking populations. They show relatively more genetic affinity for modern Central Asian than modern Siberian populations. They also share some genetic affinity for South Asian groups.

Genetic studies shows that many of the Sherpa people have allele frequencies which are often found in other Tibeto-Burman regions; the strongest affinity was for Tibetan population samples in studies done in the Tibet Autonomous Region. Genetically, the Sherpa cluster most closely with the sampled Tibetan and Han populations. Additionally, the Sherpa and Tibetans had exhibited affinity for several Nepalese populations, with the strongest for the Rai people, followed by the Magars and the Tamang.

==== Haplogroups ====
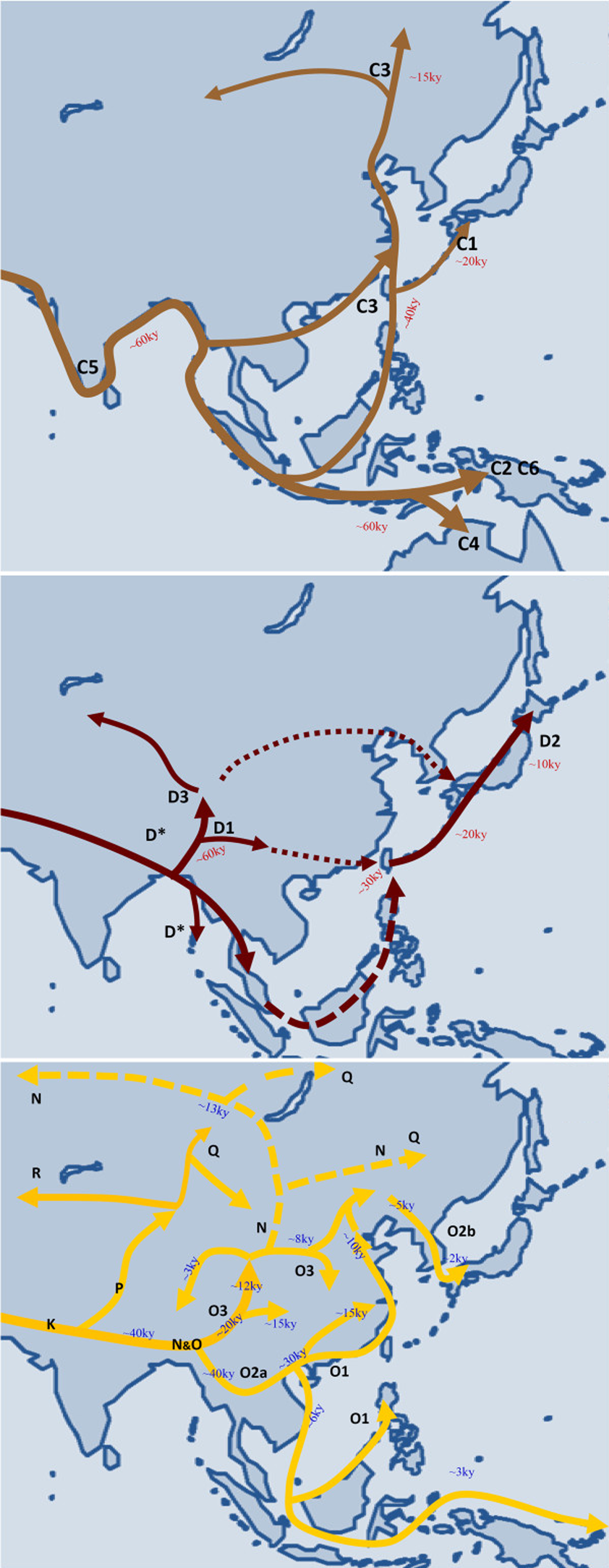
Proposed migration routes of the East Asian Y chromosome haplogroups C, D, N, and O

Tibetan males predominantly belong to the paternal lineage D-M174, followed by lower amounts of O-M175. Tibetan females belong mainly to the Northeast Asian maternal haplogroups M9a1a, M9a1b, D4g2, D4i and G2ac, showing continuity with ancient middle and upper Yellow River populations.

Although "East Asian Highlanders" (associated with haplogroup D1) are closely related to East Asian lowland farmers (associated with haplogroup O), they form a divergent sister branch to them.

==== Autosomal DNA ====
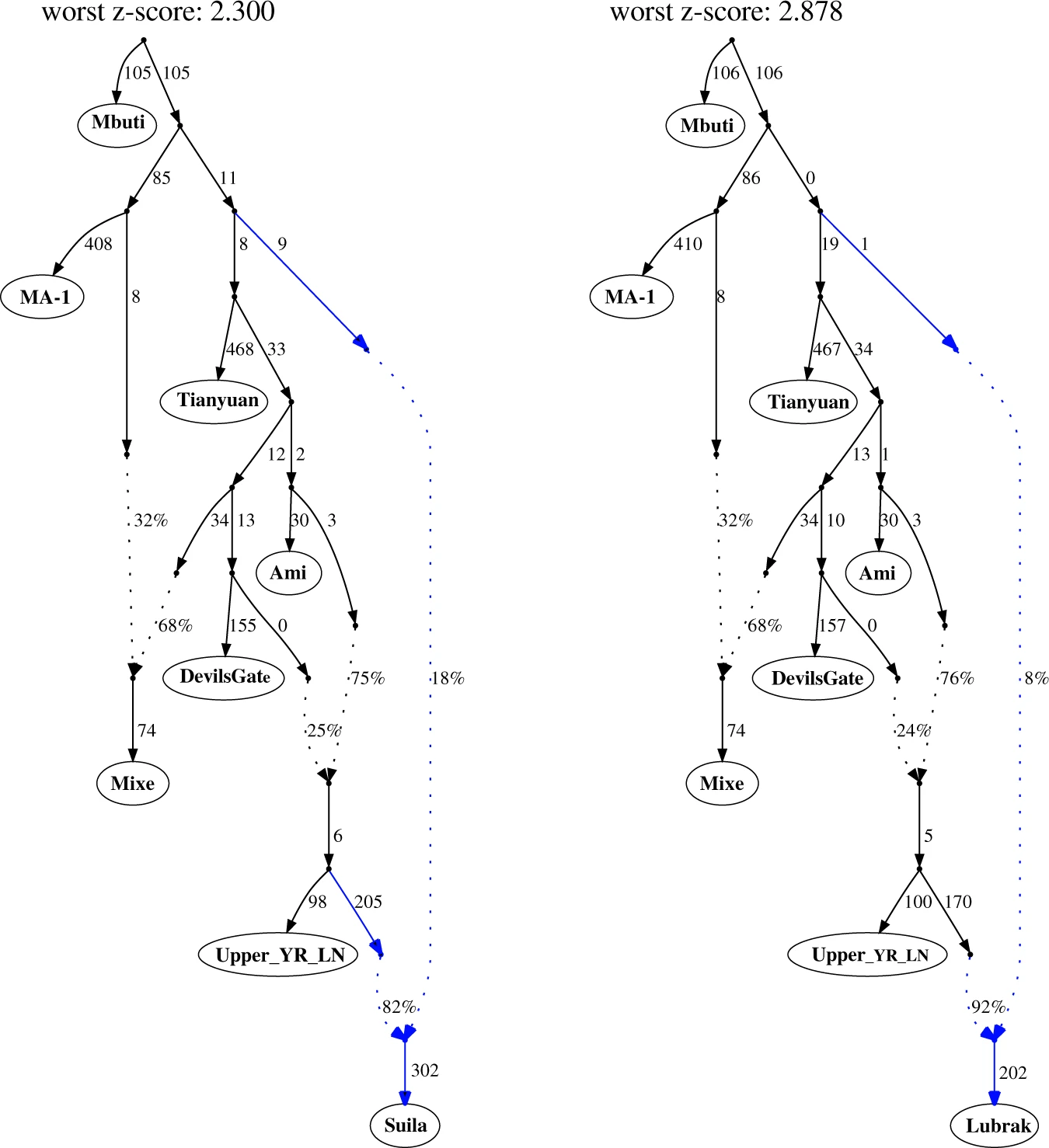
ADMIXTURE graph on modern Tibetan groups.

Full genome studies revealed that Tibetans and other high-altitude East Asians formed from two divergent Ancient East Eurasian lineages in East Asia, specifically a lineage representing the Paleolithic population of the Tibetan Plateau and a lineage associated with Ancient Northern East Asians. The Paleolithic Tibetan lineage was found to be distinct from other deep lineages such as Ust'-Ishim, Hoabinhian/Onge or Tianyuan, but forms a clade with them to the exclusion of other Eurasians. The Northern East Asian lineage can be represented by Neolithic Yellow River farmers, who are associated with the spread of Sino-Tibetan languages. Modern Tibetans derive up to 20% from Paleolithic Tibetans, with the remaining 80% being primarily derived from Yellow River farmers. Wang et al. 2025 analyzed the remains of a c. 9,000 year old specimen from Central Yunnan (Xingyi_EN) and found it to possess a newly identified Basal Asian lineage, which fits best as the source for the Tibetan Ghost. This Basal Asian Xingyi lineage is equally diverged from other Basal Asian lineages, specifically the Hoabinhian and Tianyuan lineages, but slightly closer to ancient and present-day East Asians. The formation of the present-day Tibetan gene pool dates back at least 5,100 years BP.

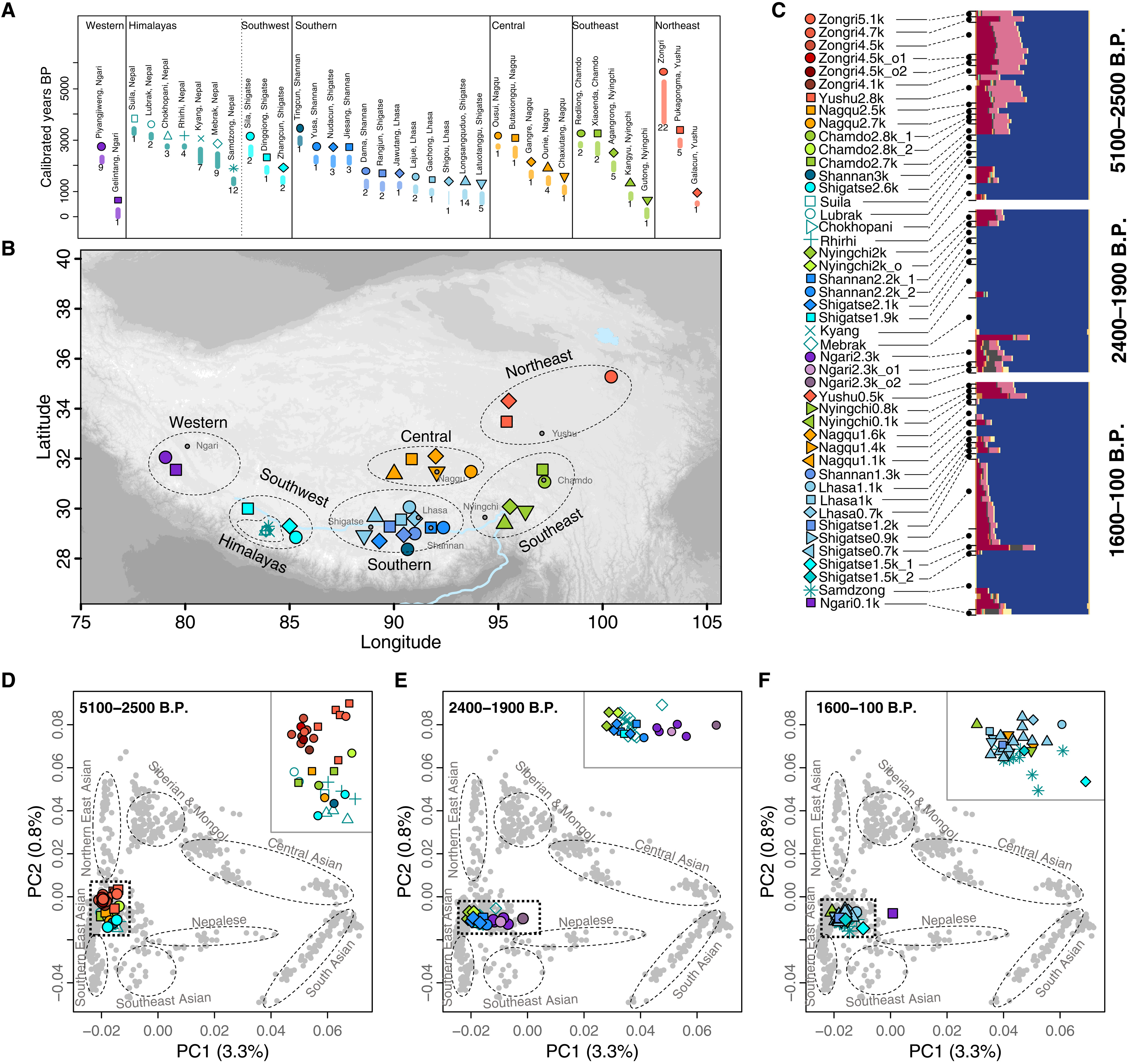
Principal component analysis (PCA) on chronological, geographic distribution and genetic data of ancient individuals of the Tibetan Plateau

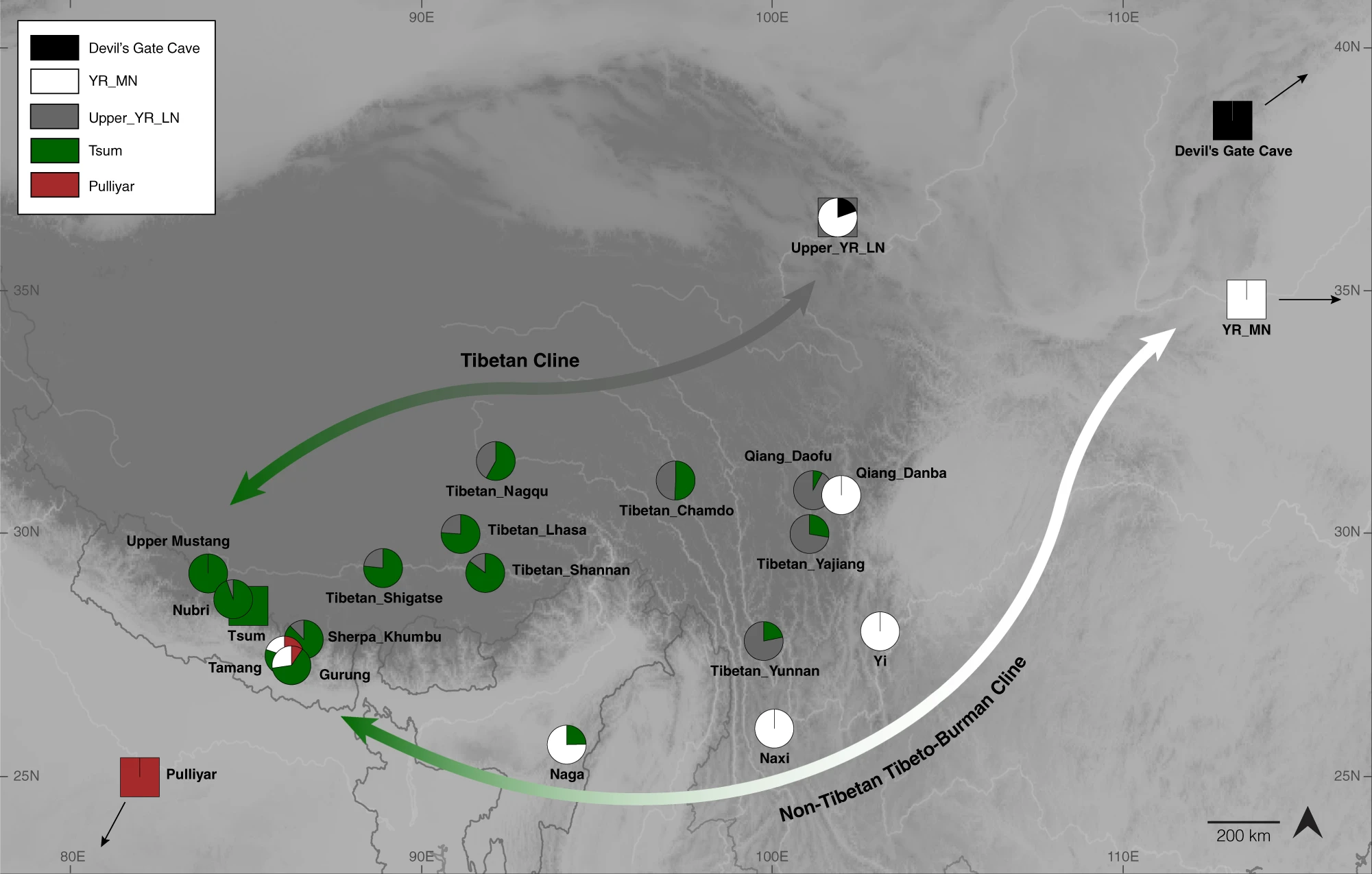
Genetic links between Tibeto-Burman speakers and their approximate ancestry components.

Northeastern Tibetans display additional geneflow from a Yellow River farmers-like population c. 4,700 years ago, resulting in the formation of a "Tibetan cline". Modern Tibetans display genetic continuity to ancient samples from Nepal, with their genetic diversity having been reduced compared to 'Early Ancient Tibetans', suggesting low to no geneflow from outside groups since c. 3,500 years ago. Subsequent internal geneflow resulted in "a northeastern plateau ancestry associated with the northeast cluster, a southern plateau ancestry associated with the south-southwest cluster, and a southeastern plateau ancestry associated with the southeast-central cluster".

There was limited contact with Central Asian populations, in line with historical events, evident in mutual geneflow. The expansion of the Tibetan Empire may have left genetic traces in surrounding populations.

==== Adaption to high-altitude environments ====
Genetic studies identified more than 30 genetic factors that make Tibetans' bodies well-suited for high-altitudes, including the EPAS1 gene, also referred to as the "super-athlete gene", which regulates the body's production of hemoglobin, allowing for greater efficiency in the use of oxygen. The genetic basis of Tibetan adaptations have been attributed to a mutation in the EPAS1 gene, and has become prevalent in the past 5,000 years. Ancient Tibetans carried this allele at a frequency of 25–58%, while modern Tibetans carry it at a frequency of >75%. The widespread presence of this gene may represent one of "the fastest genetic change ever observed in humans".

Recent research into the ability of Tibetans' metabolism to function normally in the oxygen-deficient atmosphere above 4,400 metres (14,400 ft) shows that, although Tibetans living at high altitudes have no more oxygen in their blood than other people, they have ten times more nitric oxide and double the forearm blood flow of low-altitude dwellers. Tibetans inherited this adaptation due to selected genes associated with Denisovan admixture among Asian populations, highlighting how different environments trigger different selective pressures. Nitric oxide causes dilation of blood vessels, allowing blood to flow more freely to the extremities and aids the release of oxygen to tissues.

=== Mythological origins ===
According to Tibetan mythology, the origins of Tibetans are said to be rooted in the marriage of the monkey Pha Trelgen Changchup Sempa and rock ogress Ma Drag Sinmo.

== Religion ==
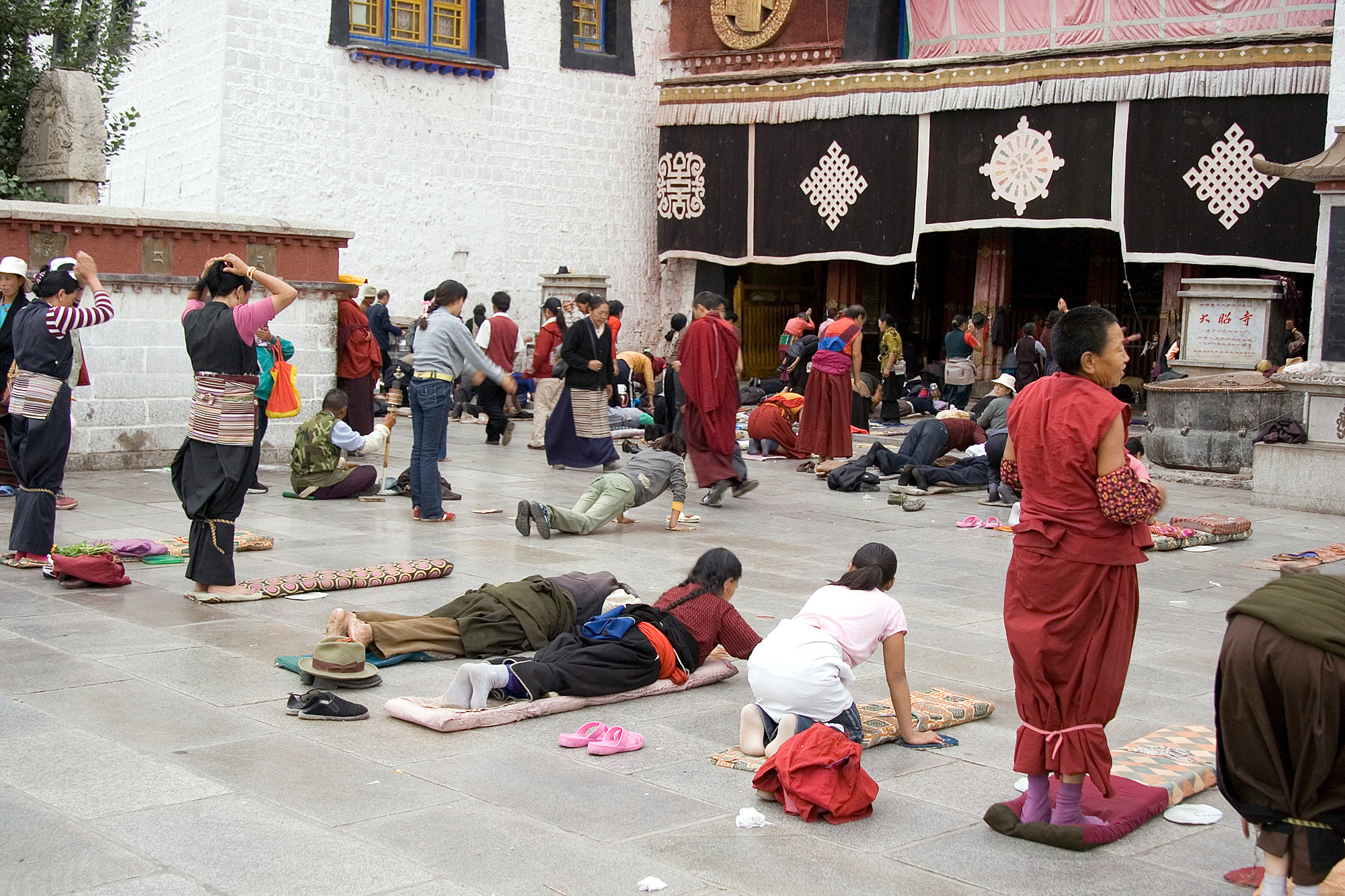
Buddhists performing prostrations in front of Jokhang Monastery.

Most Tibetans generally observe Tibetan Buddhism or a collection of native traditions known as Bön (also absorbed into mainstream Tibetan Buddhism). There is a minority Tibetan Muslim population. There is also a small Tibetan Christian population in the eastern Tibet and northwestern Yunnan of China.

According to legend, the 28th king of Tibet, Thothori Nyantsen, dreamed of a sacred treasure falling from heaven, which contained a Buddhist sutra, mantras, and religious objects. However, because the Tibetan script had not been invented, the text could not be translated in writing and no one initially knew what was written in it. Buddhism did not take root in Tibet until the reign of Songtsen Gampo, who married two Buddhist princesses, Bhrikuti of Nepal and Wencheng of China. It then gained popularity when Padmasambhāva visited Tibet at the invitation of the 38th Tibetan king, Trisong Deutson.

Today, one can see Tibetans placing Mani stones prominently in public places. Tibetan lamas, both Buddhist and Bön, play a major role in the lives of Tibetans, conducting religious ceremonies and taking care of the monasteries. Pilgrims plant prayer flags over sacred grounds as a symbol of good luck.

The prayer wheel is a means of simulating the chant of a mantra by physically revolving the object several times in a clockwise direction. It is widely seen among Tibetans. In order not to desecrate religious artifacts such as Stupas, mani stones, and Gompas, Tibetan Buddhists walk around them in a clockwise direction, although the reverse direction is true for Bön. Tibetan Buddhists chant the prayer "Om mani padme hum", while the practitioners of Bön chant "Om matri muye sale du".

== Culture ==
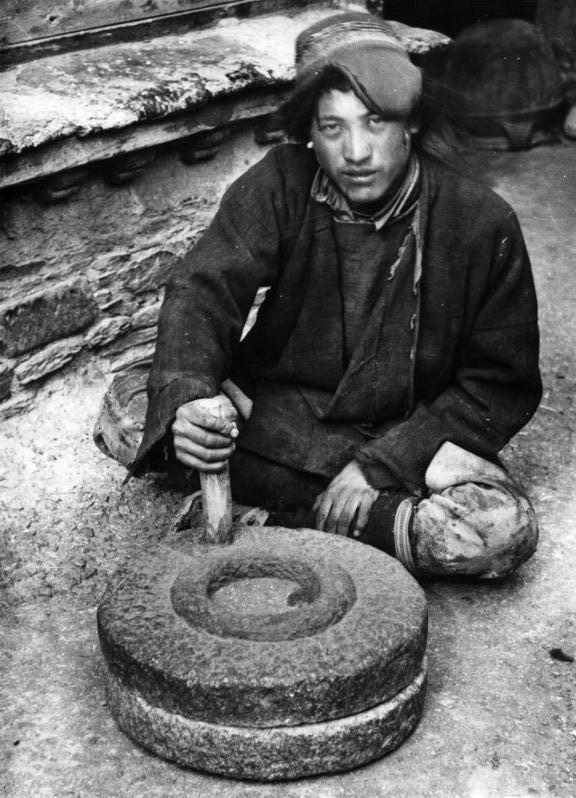
Tibetan wearing the typical hat operating a quern to grind fried barley. The perpendicular handle of such rotary handmills works as a crank (1938 photo).

Tibet is rich in culture. Tibetan festivals such as Losar, Shoton, Linka, and the Bathing Festival are deeply rooted in indigenous religion and also contain foreign influences. Each person takes part in the Bathing Festival three times: at birth, at marriage, and at death.

=== Art ===
Tibetan art is deeply religious in nature, from the exquisitely detailed statues found in Gonpas to wooden carvings and the intricate designs of the Thangka paintings. Tibetan art can be found in almost every object and every aspect of daily life.

Thangka paintings, a syncretism of Indian scroll-painting with Nepalese and Kashmiri painting, appeared in Tibet around the 8th century. Rectangular and painted on cotton or linen, they usually depict traditional motifs including religious, astrological, and theological subjects, and sometimes a mandala. To ensure that the image will not fade, organic and mineral pigments are added, and the painting is framed in colorful silk brocades.

=== Drama ===
Tibetan folk opera, known as lhamo, is a combination of dances, chants and songs. The repertoire is drawn from Buddhist stories and Tibetan history.

Tibetan opera was founded in the fourteenth century by Thang Tong Gyalpo, a lama and a bridge-builder. Gyalpo and seven girls he recruited organized the first performance to raise funds for building bridges to facilitate transportation in Tibet. The tradition continued uninterrupted for nearly seven hundred years, and performances are held on various festive occasions such as the Lingka and Shoton festival. The performance is usually a drama, held on a barren stage that combines dances, chants, and songs. Colorful masks are sometimes worn to identify a character, with red symbolizing a king and yellow indicating deities and lamas. The performance starts with a stage purification and blessings. A narrator then sings a summary of the story, and the performance begins. Another ritual blessing is conducted at the end of the play. There are also many historical myths/epics written by high lamas about the reincarnation of a "chosen one" who will do great things.

=== Architecture ===
The most unusual feature of Tibetan architecture is that many of the houses and monasteries are built on elevated, sunny sites facing the south. They are commonly made of a mixture of rocks, wood, cement and earth. Little fuel is available for heating or lighting, so flat roofs are built to conserve heat, and multiple windows are constructed to let in sunlight. Walls are usually sloped inwards at 10 degrees as a precaution against frequent earthquakes in the mountainous area. Tibetan homes and buildings are white-washed on the outside, and beautifully decorated inside.

Standing at 117 metres (384 ft) in height and 360 metres (1,180 ft) in width, the Potala Palace is considered the most important example of Tibetan architecture. Formerly the residence of the Dalai Lama, it contains over a thousand rooms within thirteen stories and houses portraits of the past Dalai Lamas and statues of the Buddha. It is divided between the outer White Palace, which serves as the administrative quarters, and the inner Red Quarters, which houses the assembly hall of the Lamas, chapels, 10,000 shrines, and a vast library of Buddhist scriptures.

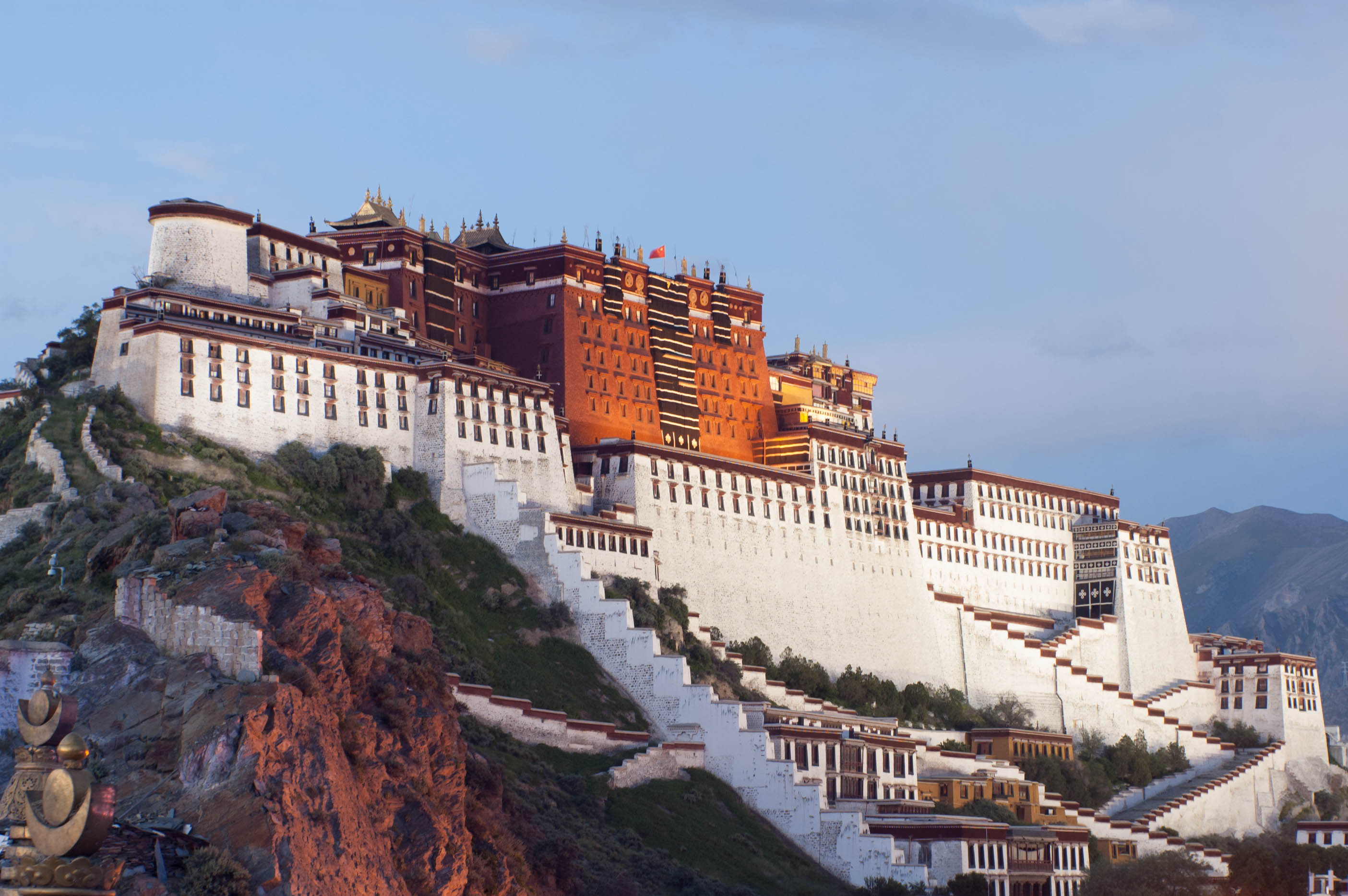
Potala Palace, 2013

=== Medicine ===
Traditional Tibetan medicine utilizes up to two thousand types of plants, forty animal species, and fifty minerals. One of the key figures in its development was the renowned 8th century physician Yuthog Yontan Gonpo, who produced the Four Medical Tantras integrating material from the medical traditions of Persia, India and China. The tantras contained a total of 156 chapters in the form of Thangkas, which tell about the archaic Tibetan medicine and the essences of medicines in other places.

=== Cuisine ===
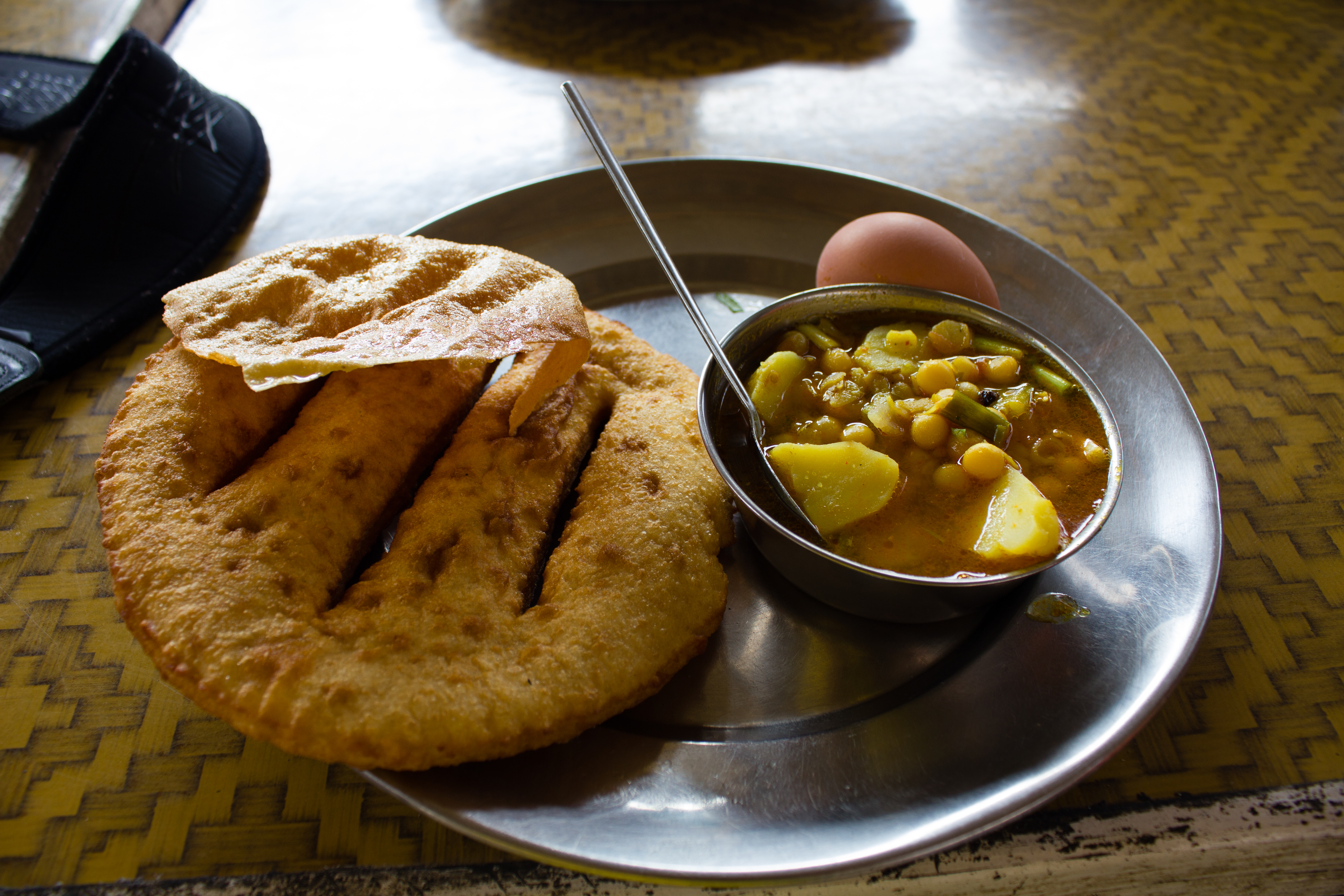
A simple Tibetan breakfast

The Cuisine of Tibet reflects the rich heritage of the country and people's adaptation to high altitude and religious culinary restrictions. The most important crop is barley. Dough made from barley flour, called tsampa, is the staple food of Tibet. This is either rolled into noodles or made into steamed dumplings called momo. Meat dishes are likely to be yak, goat or mutton, often dried or cooked into a spicy stew with potatoes. Mustard seed is cultivated in Tibet and therefore features heavily in its cuisine. Yak yogurt, butter and cheese are frequently eaten and well-prepared yogurt is considered something of a prestige item.

=== Clothing ===
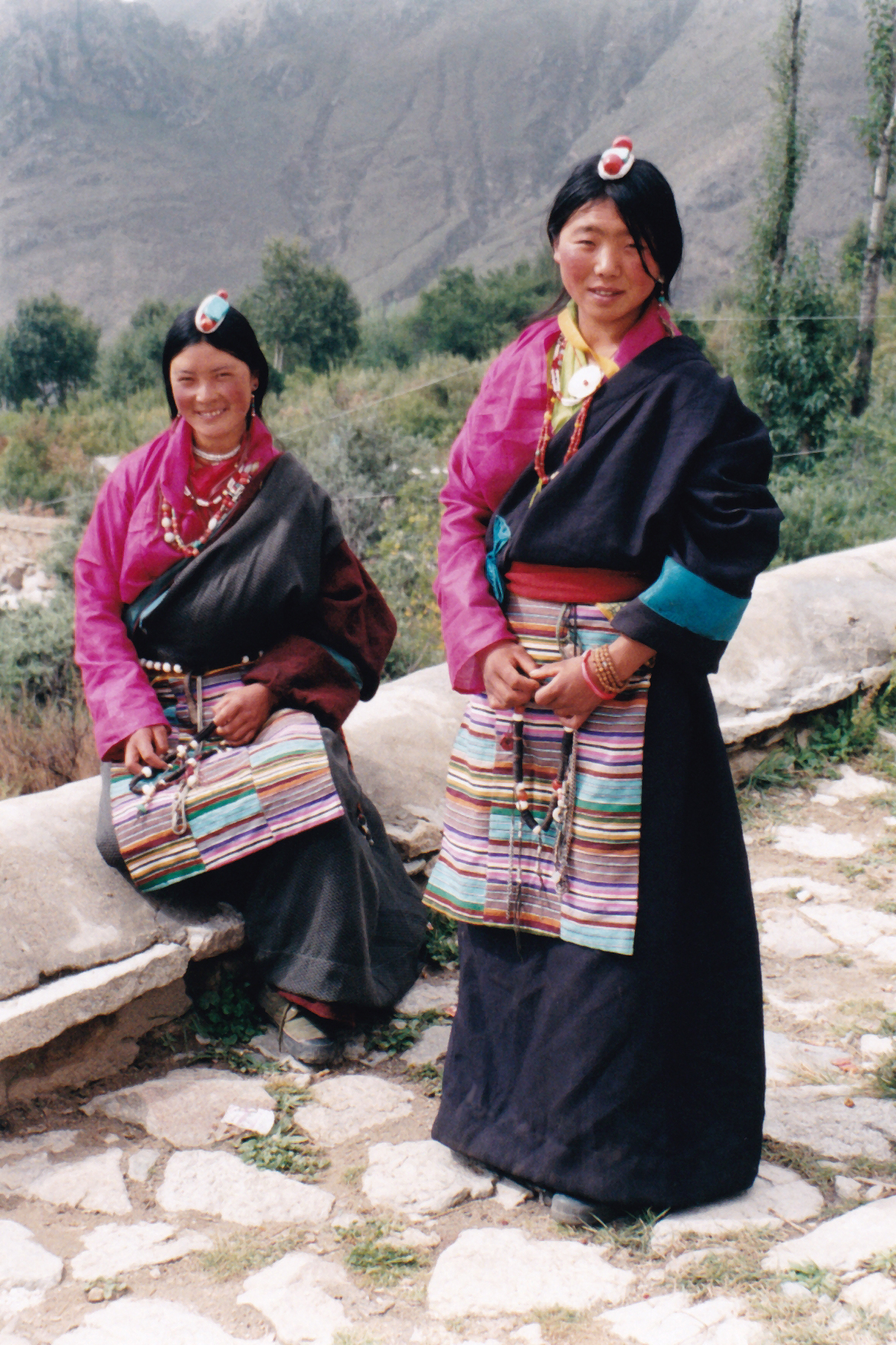
Tibetan women in chuba near Drepung Monastery

Men and Women wear long thick dresses (chuba) in more traditional and rural regions. The men wear a shorter version with pants underneath. The style of the clothing varies between regions. Nomads often wear thick sheepskin versions. In more urban places like Lhasa, men and women dress in modern clothing, and many choose to wear chuba during festivals and holidays like Losar.

=== Literature ===
Tibet has national literature that has both religious, semi-spiritual and secular elements. While the religious texts are well-known, Tibet is also home to the semi-spiritual Gesar Epic, which is the longest epic in the world and is popular throughout Mongolia and Central Asia. There are secular texts such as The Dispute Between Tea and Chang (Tibetan beer) and Khache Phalu's Advice.

== Marriage customs ==
Monogamy is common throughout Tibet. Marriages are sometimes arranged by the parents if the son or daughter has not picked their own partner by a certain age. However, polyandry is practiced in parts of Tibet. This is usually done to avoid division of property and provide financial security.

== List of Tibetan states ==
- Zhangzhung Kingdom (500 BC – AD 625)
- Yarlung dynasty (?–618) (semi-mythological)
- Tibetan Empire (618–842)
- Kingdom of Bumthang (7th–17th centuries)
- Guge Kingdom (842–1630)
- Purang Kingdom
- Maryul (930–1500)
- Tsongkha Kingdom (997–1099) (Amdo)
- Phagmodrupa dynasty (1354–1618) (Ü-Tsang)
- Maqpon kingdom (1190–1846) (Baltistan)
- Rinpungpa dynasty (1435–1565) (Tsang)
- Yabgo dynasty (before 1500–1972) (Baltistan)
- Tsangpa dynasty (1565–1642) (Tsang)
- Ganden Phodrang (1642–1959)
- Namgyal dynasty (1460–1842) (Ladakh)
- Chogyal Namgyal dynasty of Sikkim (1642–1975)
- Tibet (1912–1951)
- Bhutan (1616–present)

=== Kingdoms of Kham ===
- Nyagrong Kingdom (?–1865)
- Kingdom of Powo (?–1928)
- Nangcheng Kingdom (?–1928)
- Litang Kingdom (?–1950)
- Kingdom of Lingtsang (12th century – 1950)
- Kingdom of Derge (15th century – 1956)
- Hor States (Horpa)
- Chiefdom of Bathang

=== Gyalrong Kingdoms ===
- Kingdom of Chakla (1407–1950)
- Chiefdom of Chuchen
- Chiefdom of Tsanlha

== See also ==
- History of Tibet
- Timeline of Tibetan history
- Flag of Tibet
- Sumpa
- Upper Mustang
- Sherpa people
- Baima people
- Balti people
- Bhotias and Bhutia
- Burig
- Lepcha people
- Rai people
- Limbu people
- Lhoba people
- Monpa Tibetan
- Thakali people
- Changpa people
- Golok people
- Wutun people
- Tibetan Muslims
- Tibetan diaspora
- Tibetan Americans
- Central Tibetan Administration
- Tibetan independence movement
- Anti-Tibetan Sentiment
