= Padma Yangchan =

Indian entrepreneur, Nari Shakti Puraskar winner

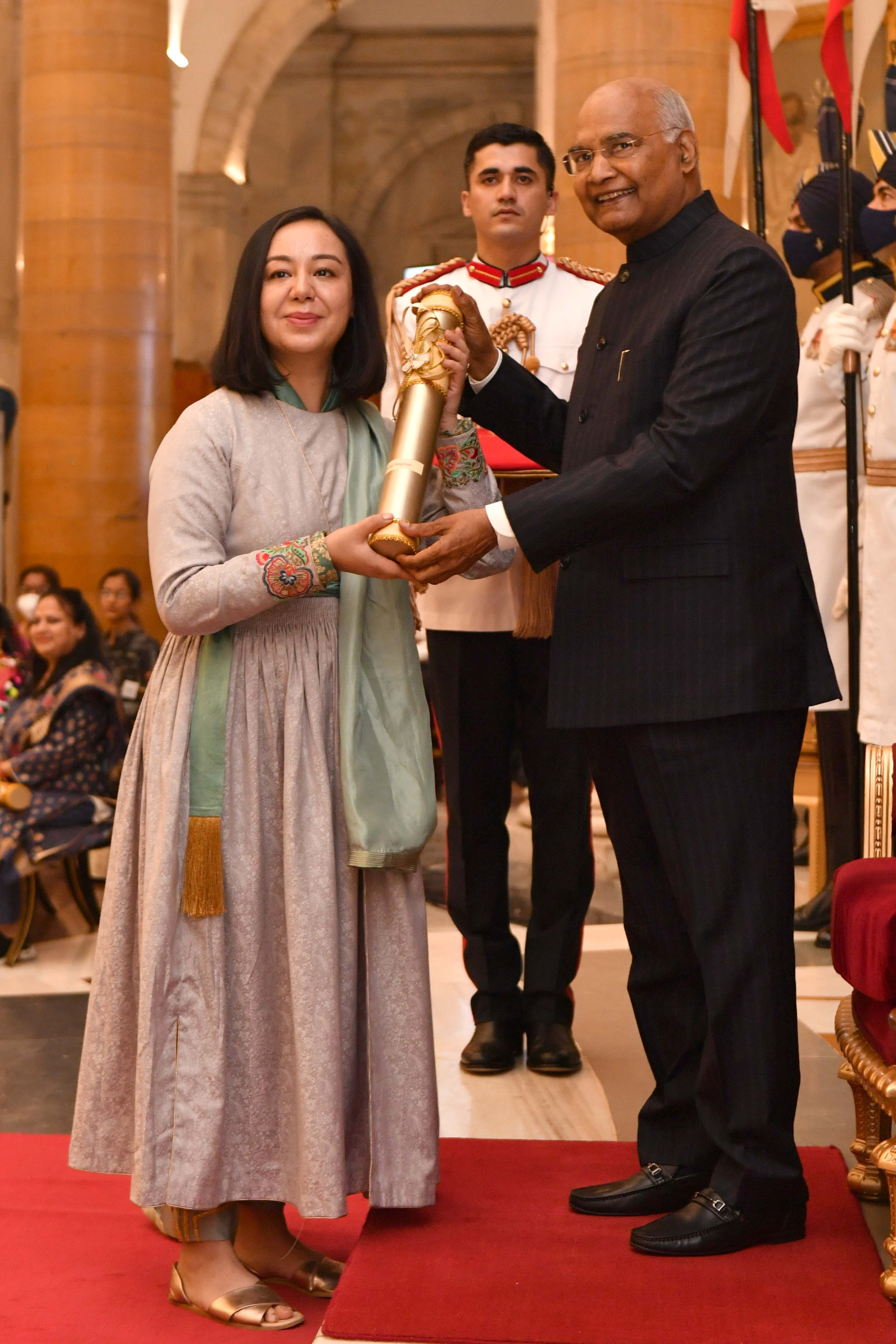
Padma Yangchan receives the Nari Shakti Puraskar from Ram Nath Kovind

Padma Yangchan is an Indian entrepreneur from Ladakh. She trained as a fashion designer . She is the owner of Namza Couture and Namza Dining and known for reviving the indigenous art and craft of Ladakh as well as the food. She has received the Nari Shakti Puraskar in recognition of her achievements.

== Career ==
Padma Yangchan was born c. 1991 in Ladakh, in northern India. She did her graduation at Lady Shri Ram College and fashion designing course from Delhi and London. Worked with renowned magazines in Delhi, London and Mumbai, before returning to Ladakh. With her business partner Jigmet Disket, Yangchan set up the clothing company Namza Couture in 2016. It uses traditional local textiles such as pashmina and wool from sheep (Ladakhi: nambu), (Ladakhi: khulu) yak and camel to make handcrafted jackets and capes. Disket produces her own dyes using onion, sunflowers and roses.

The clothing range was exhibited at London Fashion Week in 2019. Namza has a store in Leh which sells high-end couture and also has curated experiences of Ladakhi culture, traditions and lost cuisine of Ladakh . On International Women's Day 2022, she received the Nari Shakti Puraskar from President Ram Nath Kovind in recognition of her achievements.
