= Changpa =

Ethnic group

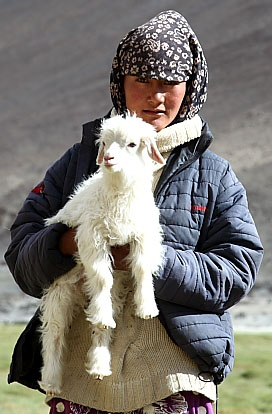

Total population
- India: 2,661 (2011)

Regions with significant populations
- India : Ladakh China : Tibet Autonomous Region; Xinjiang Autonomous Region; Qinghai

Languages
- Changthang language

Religion
- Mainly Buddhism (89%) Minority Islam (10%) and Hinduism (1%)

Related ethnic groups
- Baltis, Ladakhis, Purigpa, and other Tibetan People

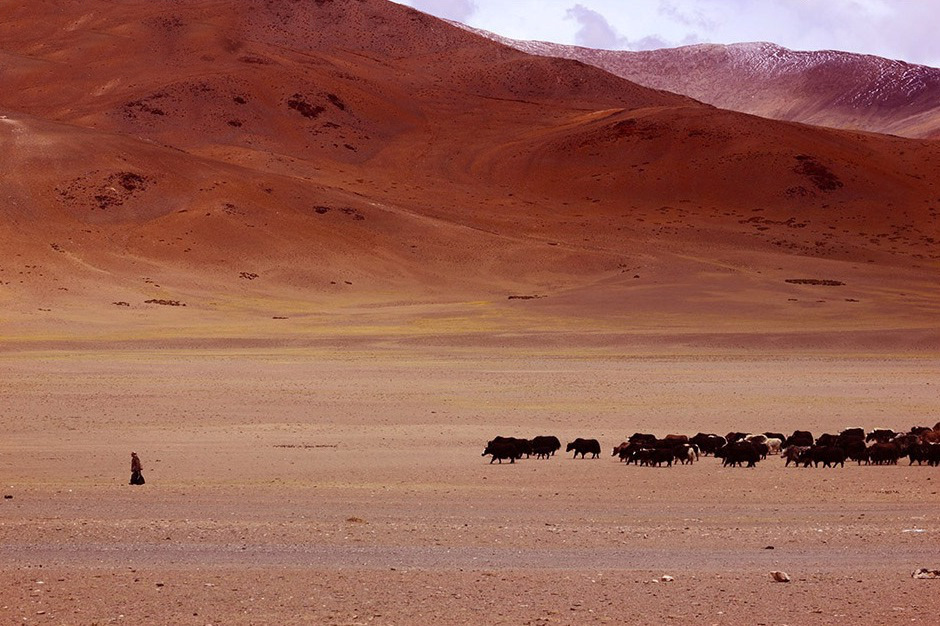
Changpa nomad

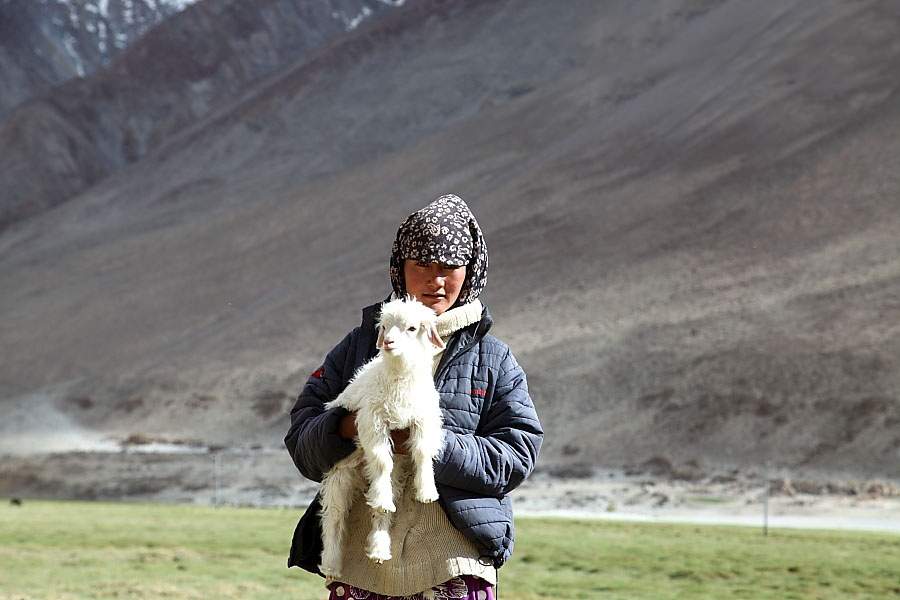
Changpa shepherd girl

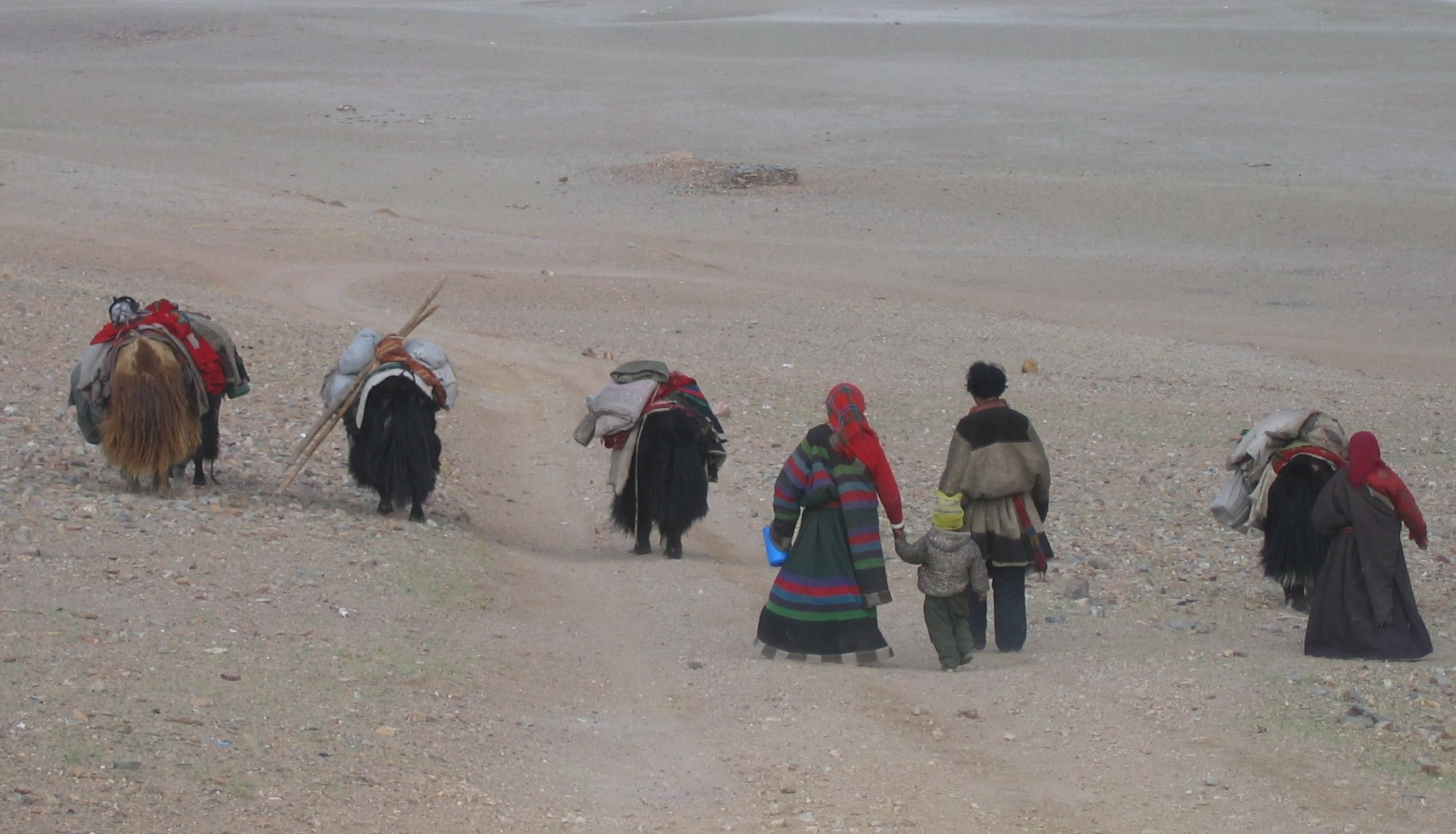
Changpa nomadic family, Tibet

The Changpa, or Champa, are a semi-nomadic Tibetan people found mainly in the Changtang plateau in Ladakh, India. A smaller number resides in the western regions of the Tibet Autonomous Region and were partially relocated for the establishment of the Changtang Nature Reserve. By 1989, there were half a million nomads living in the Changtang area.

== Changpa of the Tibet Autonomous Region ==
The homeland of the Changpa is a high-altitude plateau known as the Changtang, which forms a portion of western and northern Tibet extending to southeastern Ladakh, and Changpa means "northerners" in Tibetan. Unlike many other nomadic groups in Tibet, the Changpa are not under pressure from settled farmers as the vast majority of land they inhabit is too inhospitable for farming.

Most of the Tibetan Changtang is now protected by means of nature reserves consisting of the Chang Tang Nature Reserve, the second-largest nature reserve in the world, and four new adjoining smaller reserves totalling 496,000 km^{2} (191,507 sq. miles) of connected Nature Reserves, which represents an area almost as large as Spain and bigger than 197 countries. Since the reserves were established, there has been a welcome increase in the number of endangered species. The protected areas stretch across parts of the Tibet Autonomous Region, Xinjiang and Qinghai in China.

The Changpa of Ladakh are high-altitude pastoralists, raising mainly yaks and goats. Among the Ladakh Changpa, those who are still nomadic are known as Phalpa and they take their herds from the Hanley Valley to the village of Lato. Hanley is home to six isolated settlements, where the sedentary Changpa, the Fangpa, reside. Despite their different lifestyles, both these groups intermarry. The Changpa speak Changskhat, a dialect of Tibetan, and practice Tibetan Buddhism.

Only a small part of Changthang cross the border from Ladakh, into the neighbouring regions. It is, however, on a historically important route for travelers journeying from Ladakh to Lhasa, and now has many different characteristics due to being part of India. Historically, the Changpa of Ladakh would migrate with their herds into Tibet, but with the Chinese takeover of Tibet, this route has been closed.

As of 2001, the Changpa are classified as a Scheduled Tribe under the Indian government's reservation program of affirmative action.

== Changpa and their goats ==
For many Changpa, rearing of animals and consuming and selling their produce (milk and its products, hair and meat) is their only means of livelihood.

The Changpa rear Changra goats (Capra hircus), which yield the Pashmina (Cashmere) fibre. The Changra goats are raised for their fibre rather than for their meat. Pashmina (Pashm in Persian) is one of the finest of goat fibres.

== Documentary ==
A documentary, Riding Solo to the Top of the World, was directed by Gaurav Jani. Another documentary, The Nomadic Night, depicting the life of the Changpa, was directed by Marianne Chaud.
