= Akhone Asgar Ali Basharat =

Indian writer

Akhone Asgar Ali Basharat is an author and poet from the Kargil district in the Union Territory of Ladakh in India. His writings are in the Balti language which is a Tibetic language natively spoken by the ethnic Balti people in the Baltistan region of Gilgit-Baltistan, Pakistan, Nubra Valley of the Leh district and in the Kargil district of Ladakh, India. He had had no formal school/college education; instead, he had his early education in a madrassa established by his father at his home in 1972. The madrassa used to teach its students the Balti, Persian and Arabic languages. He became interested in writing poetry from around 1980 and his early writings were Naat (poetry in praise of the Islamic prophet, Muhammad) and Manqabat (Sufi devotional poem, in praise of any Sufi saint).

Akhone Asgar Ali Basharat was a regular participant in the poetry recitation programme of All India Radio's Kargil station from the first day of the establishment of the radio station in 1999. He is a regular invitee to poetic symposiums in different parts of Jammu & Kashmir and to shows organised by Doordarshan Srinagar, J&K Academy of Art, Culture and Languages, and other organizations. He was selected for the Padma Shri award in 2022 for his efforts to revive and popularize the Balti language.

The books (all in Balti language) authored by Akhone Asgar Ali Basharat include:

- Guldastae Bashara, a collection of poetry (2002)
- Waseelai Najaat, based on translations from Persian (2006)
- Bazme Basharat, a collection of poetry (2011)
- Aeena e Kargil (Reflections on Kargil) (to appear)

== Recognition ==
- In the year 2022, Govt of India conferred the Padma Shri award, the third highest award in the Padma series of awards, on Akhone Asgar Ali Basharat for his distinguished service in the field of literature and education. The award is in recognition of his service as a "Balti Poet and Author from Kargil working for the preservation and promotion of Balti language and culture.".
