= Yusuf Hussain Abadi =

Balti scholar and writer

Yousuf Hussain Abadi (Urdu: یوسف حسین آبادی) is known as a historian, Balti writer, translator of the Quran, linguist, scholar, social worker and pioneer in field of research in Skardu, Baltistan region of Gilgit Baltistan, Pakistan. Yousuf Hussain Abadi translated the Quran into Balti language for the first time. He also runs a museum of Balti traditional items and a chain of schools in his area.

Yousuf Hussain Abadi collected many oral war stories of the 1947-1948 war fought in Baltistan by its natives against the Dogra regime. He established the first private sector English medium school in Baltistan in 1992-93, Jinnah Public School, named after the great founder of Pakistan, Mohammad Ali Jinnah, which is currently one of the best institutions of education in Baltistan.
