= Zangskari language =

Endangered Sino-Tibetan language of India

Zangskari
- Zanskari, Zaskari, Zangs-dkar, Z’angkar
- ཟངས་དཀར
- Native to: India
- Region: Zanskar, Ladakh
- Native speakers: (12,000 cited 2000)
- Language family: Sino-Tibetan: Tibeto-Burman; Tibeto-Kanauri (?); Bodish; Tibetic; Ladakhi–Balti; Ladakhi; Zangskari
- Writing system: Tibetan script

Language codes
- ISO 639-3: zau
- Glottolog: zang1248
- ELP: Zangskari

Zangskari (also spelled Zanskari, Zaskari) is an endangered Tibetic language. It is a dialect of the Ladakhi language. It is mostly spoken in the Zanskar region of the Kargil district of Ladakh, India and also by Buddhists in the upper reaches of Lahaul, Himachal Pradesh, and Paddar, Jammu and Kashmir. It is written using the Tibetan script.

Zangskari is divided into four homogeneous groups, namely Oot (Stod) or Upper Zanskari spoken along the Doda River, Zhung (Gžun) or Central Zanskari mostly spoken in Padum valley, Sham (Gšam) or Lower Zanskari spoken along the lower portions of Zanskar River and lastly Lungnak (Luŋnag) along the upper Zanskar River region. A seminar on the documentation and revitalization of the Zanskari language was once held at GMDC Zanskar.

== Phonology ==
Zangskari shows compensatory lengthening and nasalization of vowels, unlike conservative Western Tibetic languages.

=== Consonants ===
		Bilabial	Dental	Alveolar	Postalveolar		Palatal	Velar	Glottal
		Bilabial	Dental	Alveolar	laminal	apical	Palatal	Velar	Glottal
Nasal		m	n				ɲ	ŋ	
Stop	aspirated	pʰ	tʰ	t͡sʰ	t͡ʃʰ	ʈʰ		kʰ	
Stop	voiceless	p	t	t͡s	t͡ʃ	ʈ		k	(ʔ)
Stop	voiced	b	d	d͡z	d͡ʒ	ɖ		g	
Fricative	voiceless	ɸ	θ	s	ʃ	ʂ	ç		h
Fricative	voiced	β	ð	z	ʒ	ɹ̝	ʝ		
Rhotic				r					
Approximant		w		l			j	ɰ	

=== Vowels ===
Monophthongs
	Front		Central		Back	
	oral	nasal	oral	nasal	oral	nasal
Close	i iː	ĩː			u uː	ũː
Mid	e eː				o oː	õː
Open			a aː	ãː		

The diphthongs are /ai/, /ao/, /ui/, /oe/, /oa/, /ea/, /iu/, /ũã/, /õã/, /ũĩ/, and /ĩũ/.
