= Ladakhi–Balti languages =

Subgroup of Tibetic languages

Ladakhi–Balti
- Western Archaic Tibetan
- Geographic distribution: Ladakh (India), Gilgit-Baltistan (Pakistan)
- Linguistic classification: Sino-Tibetan: Tibeto-Burman; Tibeto-Kanauri (?); Bodish; Tibetic; Ladakhi–Balti

Language codes
- Glottolog: lada1242

The Ladakhi–Balti languages or Western Archaic Tibetan languages are a subgroup of the Tibetic languages spoken in the Ladakh region of India and in the Gilgit-Baltistan territory of Pakistan. The lects lack mutual intelligibility and are considered separate languages by their speakers. The grouping includes:

- Ladakhi (Ladakh, Tibet)
- Zangskari (Ladakh)
- Purgi (Ladakh, Baltistan)
- Balti (Baltistan, Ladakh)
- Changthang (Ladakh, Tibet)

Proto-Western Tibetan has been reconstructed by Backstrom (1994).

== See also ==
- List of Proto-Western Tibetan reconstructions (Wiktionary)
