= Ladakhis =

Group of people native to the Ladakh in India

ལ་དྭགས་པ།
- Ladakhi man at Shey Monastery, Leh

Regions with significant populations
- India (Ladakh): 115,089 (2011)
- China (Tibet): 12,000 (1995)

Languages
- Ladakhi

Religion
- Buddhism • Islam

Related ethnic groups
- Tibetan people, Balti people, Purigpa, other Tibetic peoples

Ladakhis, Ladakhi people, or Ladakspa are an ethnic group and first-language speakers of the Ladakhi language living in Ladakh in India and a small minority in Tibet in China.

== History ==
Ladakh has a long history with evidence of human settlement from as back as 9000 B.C.E. It has been a crossroad of high Asia for thousands of years and has seen many cultures, empires and technologies born in its neighbors. As a result of these developments Ladakh has imported many traditions and culture from its neighbors and combining them all gave rise to a unique tradition and culture of its own.

== Culture ==
The languages, religions, dance, music, architecture, food, and customs of the Ladakh region are similar to Tibet. Ladakhi is the traditional language of the region. The popular dances in Ladakh include the khatok chenmo, cham, etc. The people of Ladakh also celebrate several festivals throughout the year, some of them are Hemis Tsechu and Losar.

== Religion ==
The region's population is split roughly in half between the districts of Leh and Kargil. 76.87% population of Kargil is Muslim (mostly Shia), with a total population of 140,802, while that of Leh is 66.40% Buddhist, with a total population of 133,487, as per the 2011 census. In 2024, 5 new districts were created. Currently Buddhism is the majority faith in five of the districts-Leh, Changthang, Zanskar, Sham and Nubra; and Islam is the majority faith in Kargil and Drass district. The majority of Ladakhis, Changpa and Brokpa follow Buddhism while most Purigpa and Shina follow Islam. Brokpa, Drokpa, Dard and Shinu tribes and Shina people, the main inhabitants of the Dras and Dha-Hanu regions, predominantly follow Islam while small minorities follow Tibetan Buddhism.

== See also ==
- Tibetans in India
