= Changthang language =

Ladakhi dialect of Ladakh, India and Tibet, China

Changthang
- ཆངཐང་སཀད
- Native to: India, China
- Region: Changthang
- Ethnicity: Changpa
- Native speakers: (10,000 cited 2000)
- Language family: Sino-Tibetan: Tibeto-Burman; Tibeto-Kanauri (?); Bodish; Tibetic; Ladakhi–Balti; Ladakhi; Changthang
- Writing system: Tibetan script

Language codes
- ISO 639-3: cna
- Glottolog: chan1309

Changthang Skad, also known as Byangskat and Upper Ladakhi, is a dialect of Ladakhi language spoken in a Changthang region on the border of Tibet and Ladakh. Speakers of the language are known as Changpa and identify ethnically with the Ladakhis, but mutual intelligibility of the languages is not high.
