= Purigpa =

Community of Kargil district of Union Territory of Ladakh, India

Total population
- 45,000 (2025)

Regions with significant populations
- India: Ladakh, Kargil District

Languages
- Purgi language

Religion
- Predominately Shia Islam (98%): Minority Sunni Islam (2%)

Related ethnic groups
- Other Dardic People and Tibetan People

The Purigpa are a community found in Kargil district, Ladakh, India and Gilgit-Baltistan, Pakistan. Out of 45,000 Purigpas all are Muslim.

== Social status ==
As of 2001, the Purigpa were classified as a Scheduled Tribe under the Indian government's reservation program of positive discrimination. As of 2011 Population Census of India, Purigpa population stood at 39,101 with 20,119 males and 18,982 females. The adult sex ratio stood at 943 and child sex ratio at 971. They boasted a literacy rate of 67.5 per cent, which was better than the average tribal literacy rate of 50.6 per cent in the erstwhile state of Jammu and Kashmir.

== History and culture ==
The Purigpa have varied origins and are descendants of Tibetans and Dards. These two groups began intermingling from the 10th century onward.

The Purigpa are primarily Shia Muslims of the Twelver sect while a minority practice Sunni Islam. The Purigpa first converted to lslam under the influence of Noorbakshia preachers who arrived via Baltistan beginning in the 15th and 16th centuries.

Purigpa traditional dress include the goncha (a type of robe) and staples of the local diet include consumption of tsampa and butter tea. Most Purigpa are farmers and the usage of the Tibetan calendar for agricultural purposes is still common.

== See also ==
- Kargil district
- Purgi language
- Balti people
