= Purgi language =

Tibetic language spoken in India and Pakistan

Purki
- Purigi, Purki
- Native to: India, Pakistan
- Region: Ladakh
- Ethnicity: Purigpa
- Native speakers: 94,000 (2011 census)
- Language family: Sino-Tibetan: Tibeto-Burman; Tibeto-Kanauri (?); Bodish; Tibetic; Ladakhi–Balti; Purki
- Writing system: Perso-Arabic script Tibetan script

Official status
- Official language in: India: Ladakh

Language codes
- ISO 639-3: prx
- Glottolog: puri1258
- ELP: Purik

Purgi, Burig, Purki, Purik, Purigi or Puriki (Tibetan script: པུ་རིག་་སྐད།, Nastaʿlīq script: پُرگِی) is a Tibetic language closely related to the Ladakhi-Balti language. Purgi is natively spoken by the Purigpa people in Ladakh region of India and Baltistan region of Pakistan. There are about 94,000 native speakers of the language in India.

Most of the Purigpas are Shia Muslims, although a significant number of them follow Noorbakhshi and Sunni Islam, and a small minority of Buddhists and Bön followers reside in areas like Fokar valley, Mulbekh, Wakha. Like the Baltis, they speak an archaic Tibetan dialect closely related to Balti and Ladakhi. Purigi is more closely related to Balti than Ladakhi, so there are different opinions among linguists in considering Purigi and Balti as different languages or simply different varieties of the same language.

== Phonology ==
=== Consonants ===
		Labial	Dental/ Alveolar	Retroflex	Post- alveolar	Palatal	Velar	Uvular	Glottal
Nasal		m	n			ɲ	ŋ		
Stop	voiceless	p	t	ʈ			k	q	
Stop	aspirated	pʰ	tʰ	ʈʰ			kʰ		
Stop	voiced	b	d	ɖ			ɡ		
Affricate	voiceless		t͡s		t͡ʃ				
Affricate	aspirated		t͡sʰ		t͡ʃʰ				
Affricate	voiced		d͡z		d͡ʒ				
Fricative	voiceless	(f)	s	ʂ	ʃ			χ	h
Fricative	voiced		z		ʒ			ʁ	
Fricative	lateral		ɬ						
Trill/Tap			r	ɽ					
Approximant	lateral		l						
Approximant	central	w				j			

- /pʰ/ may also be realized as a fricative [f].
- /r/ is often fricativized, being heard as [r̝].

=== Vowels ===
	Front	Central	Back
Close	i		u
Mid	e	(ə)	o
Open		a	

- /a/ may often be heard as back [ʌ] or centralized [ʌ̈], and in certain environments as [ɛ].
- Sounds /e, o/ may often be heard as [ɛ, ɔ].
- /e/ can be heard as [ə] when in unstressed syllables.
