= Balti language =

Tibetic language of Baltistan, Pakistan

Balti
- بلتی སྦལ་འཐུས་
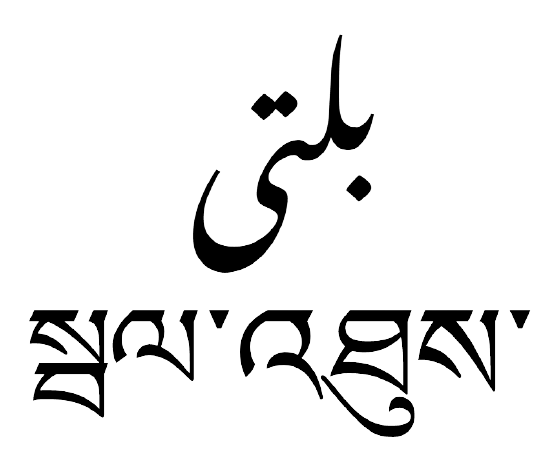
- Native to: Pakistan, India
- Region: Baltistan, Ladakh
- Ethnicity: Balti
- Native speakers: 425,000 in Pakistan (2018) Total users in all countries: 438,800 (2018)
- Language family: Sino-Tibetan: Tibeto-Burman; Tibeto-Kanauri (?); Bodish; Tibetic; Ladakhi–Balti; Balti
- Writing system: Perso-Arabic script (current); Tibetan script (current); Balti (Historical)

Language codes
- ISO 639-3: bft
- Glottolog: balt1258
- ELP: Balti
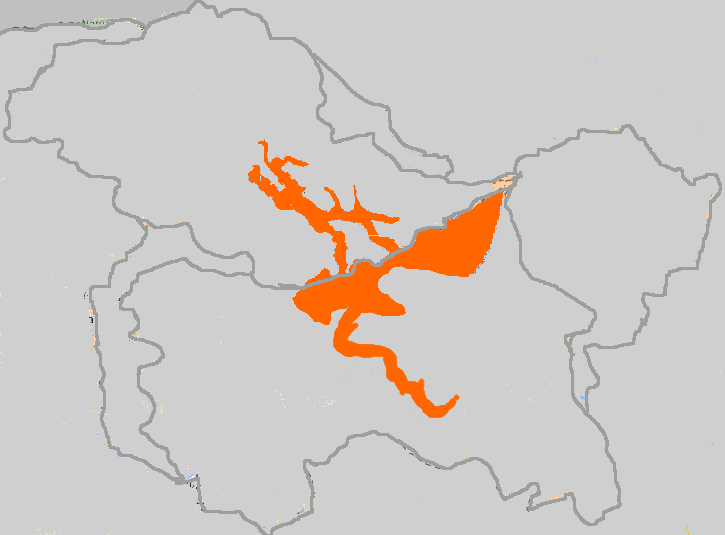
- Balti language speaking areas

This is a video example of Balti being spoken by Rizwan, a speaker of Balti

Balti (Perso-Arabic script: بلتی, Tibetan: སྦལ་ཏི།, Wylie: sbal ti) is a Tibetic language natively spoken by the ethnic Balti people in the Baltistan region of Gilgit-Baltistan, Pakistan, Nubra Valley of the Leh district and the Kargil district of Ladakh, India. The language differs from Standard Tibetan; many sounds of Old Tibetan that were lost in Standard Tibetan are retained in the Balti language. It also has a simple pitch accent system only in multi-syllabic words while Standard Tibetan has a complex and distinct pitch system that includes tone contour. Due to effects of dominant languages in Pakistani media like Urdu, Punjabi and English and religious impact of Arabic and Persian languages, Balti, like other regional languages of Pakistan, is continuously expanding its vocabulary base with loanwords.

== Demographics and distribution ==
Balti is spoken in Baltistan in Pakistan and Kargil and Nubra, Ladakh in India. According to the Gilgit-Baltistan Scouts, the language is mostly spoken in the Skardu, Shigar, Ghanche, Roundu, and Kharmang regions of Gilgit-Baltistan. In the twin districts of Ladakh region (Kargil and Leh), it is spoken in Kargil city and its surrounding villages like Hardas, Lato, Karkitchhoo, and Balti Bazar, as well as in Turtuk, Bogdang, and Tyakshi, including Leh city and nearby villages. Balti is also spoken by immigrants in Karachi, Lahore, Peshawar, Islamabad, Quetta, and other cities of Pakistan. In India, it is found in Dehradun, Nainital, Ambari, Shimla, Vikasnagar, and other northern cities among speakers who migrated from Baltistan, Kargil, and Nubra before the partition of India and Pakistan.

== Classification and dialects ==
Historically, Buddhists in Leh have referred to all Muslims in Ladakh as Balti.

The Balti language has four variants or dialects. Despite differences in phonology and vocabulary, they are mutually intelligible. For example, to keep is yuq in other varieties, but juq in the southern dialect of Kharmang and Kargil. Similarly, milk is oma in the eastern Chorbat-Nubra, the central Khaplu, and the southern Kharmang-Kargil varieties, but ona in the western dialect of Skardu, Shigar, and Rondu valley. The four variants or dialects of Balti are:

1. Eastern dialect of Chorbat and Nubra valley
2. Central dialect of Khaplu valley
3. Western dialect of Skardu, Shigar and Rondu.
4. Southern dialect of Upper Kharmang and Kargil

English	Eastern Nubra/Chorbat dialect	Central Khaplu dialect	Western Skardu dialect	Southern Kharmang dialect
Milk	Oma	Oma	Ona	Oma
Keep	Yuq	Yuq	Yuq	Juq
Girl	Bono	Bono	Bono	Bomo
You	Yan	Yan	Yang	Yan
Mountain	Braq	Braq	Blaq	Braq

== Phonology ==
=== Consonants ===
		Labial	Dental/ Alveolar	Retroflex	Post- alveolar	Palatal	Velar	Uvular	Glottal
Stop	voiceless	p	t	ʈ			k	q	
Stop	aspirated	pʰ	tʰ	ʈʰ			kʰ		
Stop	voiced	b	d	ɖ			ɡ	ɢ	
Affricate	voiceless		t͡s		t͡ʃ				
Affricate	aspirated		t͡sʰ		t͡ʃʰ				
Affricate	voiced		d͡z		d͡ʒ				
Fricative	voiceless		s	(ʂ)	ʃ			χ	h
Fricative	voiced		z		ʒ			ʁ	
Nasal		m	n			ɲ	ŋ		
Tap			ɾ	(ɽ)					
Lateral	plain		l	(ɭ)					
Lateral	murmured		(lʱ)						
Approximant		w				j			

- Allophones of /l/ include [lʱ], [ɭ] and [ɫ̥].
- /ɖ/ can be realized as a flap [ɽ].
- /s/ can also be retroflex [ʂ].

=== Vowels ===
	Front	Central	Back
Close	i		u
Mid	e	ə	o
Open		ɑ	

- /ɑ/ varies between an open back [ɑ], an open-mid back [ʌ], and an open central [ä].
- The mid /e, o/ can be as low as open-mid [ɛ, ɔ].

== Orthographies ==
The predominant writing system currently in use for Balti is the Perso-Arabic script, although there have been attempts to revive the Tibetan script, which was used between the 8th and the 16th centuries. Additionally, there are two, nowadays possibly extinct, indigenous writing systems and there have been proposals for the adoption of Latin script- as well as Devanagari-based orthographies that were adjusted for writing Balti by the Central Institute of Indian Languages in the 1970s.

In 1985, Yusuf Hussain Abadi added four new letters to the Tibetan script and seven new letters to the Perso-Arabic script to adapt both of them to the needs of the Balti language. Two of the four added letters now stand included in the Tibetan Unicode block. Since then there has been books and documents, including the Balti translation of the Qur'an using the perso-arabic script of Balti.

Balti was written with a version of the Tibetan script from 727 AD, when Baltistan was conquered by Tibetans, until the last quarter of the 14th century, when the Baltis converted to Islam. Subsequently, the Perso-Arabic script replaced the Tibetan script, but the former had no letters for seven Balti sounds and was in vogue despite being defective. Adding the seven new letters has now made it a complete script for Balti.

Recently, a number of Balti scholars and social activists have attempted to promote the use of the Tibetan Balti or "Yige" alphabet (اِگے) with the aim of helping to preserve indigenous Balti and Ladakhi culture and ethnic identity. Following a request from this community, the September 2006 Tokyo meeting of ISO/IEC 10646 WG2 agreed to encode two characters invented by Abadi (U+0F6B TIBETAN LETTER KKA and TIBETAN U+0F6C LETTER RRA) in the ISO 10646 and Unicode standards in order to support rendering Urdu loanwords present in modern Balti using the Yige alphabet.

=== Perso-Arabic alphabet ===
Below table presents Balti language Perso-Arabic letters.

Letter	Romanization	IPA	Balti-Tibetan (Yige) Eq.
ا	ā, a, (e), o, -	/ɑ/, /ə/, /e/, /o/, /∅/	ཨ
ب	b	/b/	བ
پ	p	/p/	པ
ت	t	/t/	ཏ
ٹ	ṭ	/ʈ/	ཊ
ث	(s)	/s/	ས
ج	j	/d͡ʒ/	ཇ
ڃ	ž	/ʒ/	ཞ
چ	č	/t͡ʃ/	ཅ
ڇ	kr/č̣	/ʈ͡ʂ/	ཀྲ
ح	(h)	/h/	ཧ
خ	x	/x/	ཁ༹
د	d	/d/	ད
ڈ	ḍ	/ɖ/	ཌ
ذ	(z)	/z/	ཟ
ر	r	/ɾ/	ར
ڑ	ṛ	/ɽ/	ཬ
ز	z	/z/	ཟ
ڗ	đ/dz	/d͡z/	ཛ
ژ	c/ts	/t͡s/	ཙ
س	s	/s/	ས
ش	š	/ʃ/	ཤ
ݜ	ṣ	/ʂ/	ཥ
ص	(s)	/s/	ས
ض	(z)	/z/	ཟ
ط	(t)	/t/	ཏ
ظ	(z)	/z/	ཟ
ع	(ā), (a), (e), (o), (-)	/ɑ/, /ə/, /e/, /o/, /∅/	ཨ
غ	ǧ	/ʁ~ɢ/	ག༹
ف	f	/pʰ~f/	ཕ༹
ق	q	/q/	ཫ
ک	k	/k/	ཀ
گ	g	/ɡ/	ག
ࣈ	gr/ǩ/ṡ	/ɕ/	གྲ
ل	l	/l/, (/ɭ/), (/ɫ/)	ལ
م	m	/m/	མ
ن	n	/n/	ན
ݨ	ŋ/ng	/ŋ/	ང, ན
ݩ	ň/ny	/ɲ/	ཉ
و	w, u	/w/, /u/	ཝ
ہ	h	/h/	ཧ
ھ	_h	/◌ʰ/, /◌ʱ/	
ی	y, i	/j/, /i/	ཡ
ے	e/ay	/e/	

Table below presents the aspirates, where they're written as digraphs, same is Urdu orthography, using the letter «ھ». Note that other aspirate digraphs not shown in the table below are to be expected as well, when present in loanwords of Urdu origin.

Letter	Romanization	IPA	Balti-Tibetan (Yige) Eq.
پھ	ph	/pʰ/	ཕ
تھ	th	/tʰ/	ཐ
ٹھ	th	/ʈʰ/	ཋ
چھ	čh	/tʃʰ/	ཆ
ڇھ	khr	/ʈʂʰ/	ཁྲ
ژھ	ch	/tsʰ/	ཚ
کھ	kh	/kʰ/	ཁ

Below table shows the vowels in Balti, the representation of which would be similar to Urdu. Diacritics are usually dropped in regular writing, but can be written in order to clarify pronunciation and remove potential ambiguities.

Vowels
ISO 15919	IPA	Balti-Arabic		
ISO 15919	IPA	Final	Medial	Initial
a	[ə]	ـہ	ـ◌َـ	اَ
ā	[aː]	ـا		آ
i	[ɪ]	◌ِی	ـ◌ِـ	اِ
ī	[iː]	◌ِی	◌ِـیـ	اِیـ
u	[ʊ]	◌ُو	ـ◌ُـ	اُ
ū	[uː]	◌ُو		اُو
ē	[eː]	ے	ـیٰـ	ایٰـ
ai	[aːɪ~ɛː]	◌َـے	◌َـیـ	اَیـ
ō	[oː]	◌وٗ		اوٗ
au	[aːʊ~ɔː]	◌َـو		اَو

=== Balti-Tibetan (Yige) Alphabet ===
Red Tibetan letters indicate uniquely created letters for sounds in Balti (mostly from Urdu, Persian, Arabic, or English loanwords), and red Arabic letters indicates letters whose pronunciation is merged with other Arabic letters and their only usage is for loanwords of Arabic origin.

	Unaspirated high		Aspirated medium		Voiced low		Nasal low	
	Letter	IPA Arabic eq.	Letter	IPA Arabic eq.	Letter	IPA Arabic eq.	Letter	IPA Arabic eq.
Guttural	ཀ	/ka/	ཁ	/kʰa/	ག	/ɡa/	ང	/ŋa/
Guttural	ཀ	ک	ཁ	کھ	ག	گ	ང	ݨ، نگ
Palatal	ཅ	/tʃa/	ཆ	/tʃʰa/	ཇ	/dʒa/	ཉ	/ɲa/
Palatal	ཅ	چ	ཆ	چھ	ཇ	ج	ཉ	ݩ
Dental	ཏ	/ta/	ཐ	/tʰa/	ད	/da/	ན	/na/
Dental	ཏ	ت، ط	ཐ	تھ	ད	د	ན	ن
Dental	ཙ	/tsa/	ཚ	/tsʰa/	ཛ	/dza/	ཝ	/wa/
Dental	ཙ	ژ	ཚ	ژھ	ཛ	ڗ	ཝ	و
Retroflex	ཊ	/ʈa/	ཋ	/ʈʰa/	ཌ	/ɖa/	ན	/ɳa/
Retroflex	ཊ	ٹ	ཋ	ٹھ	ཌ	ڈ	ན	ݨ
Labial	པ	/pa/	ཕ	/pʰa/	བ	/ba/	མ	/ma/
Labial	པ	پ	ཕ	پھ	བ	ب	མ	م
low	ཞ	/ʒa/	ཟ	/za/	འ	/a/ ⟨ʼa⟩	ཡ	/ja/
low	ཞ	ڃ	ཟ	ذ، ز، ض، ظ	འ	ا	ཡ	ی
medium	ར	/ra/	ལ	/la/	ཤ	/ʃa/	ས	/sa/
medium	ར	ر	ལ	ل	ཤ	ش	ས	ث، س، ص
medium Retroflex	ཬ	/ɽa/					ཥ	/ʂa/
medium Retroflex	ཬ	ڑ					ཥ	ݜ
others	ཫ	/qa/	ཁ༹	/χa/	ཕ༹	/fa/	ཧ	/ha/
others	ཫ	ق	ཁ༹	خ	ཕ༹	ف	ཧ	ح، ہ
others	ག༹	/ʁa/	ཨ	/a/ ⟨ꞏa⟩				
others	ག༹	غ	ཨ	ا				

Below table shows specific commonly used digraphs, ones that have correspondence and distinction in Balti phonology and Perso-Arabic script.

Letter	IPA	Letter	IPA Arabic eq.	Letter	IPA Arabic eq.
ཀྲ	/ʈʂa/	ཁྲ	/ʈʂʰa/	གྲ	/ɕa/
ཀྲ	ڇ	ཁྲ	ڇھ	གྲ	ࣈ

In Balti-Tibetan (Yige) script, each letter has an inherent [a] vowel. Other vowels are indicated as per the table below.

Vowel diacritics and examples with ཀ.
ཨ a IPA: [ə]	ཨཱ ā IPA: [ɑː]	ཨི i IPA: [ɪ]	ཨཱི ī IPA: [iː]	ཨུ u IPA: [ʊ]	ཨཱུ ū IPA: [uː]	ཨེ ē IPA: [eː]	ཨཻ ai IPA: [aːɪ~ɛː]	ཨོ ō IPA: [oː]	ཨཽ au IPA: [aːʊ~ɔː]
◌ a IPA: [ə]	◌ཱ ā IPA: [ɑː]	◌ི i IPA: [ɪ]	◌ཱི ī IPA: [iː]	◌ུ u IPA: [ʊ]	◌ཱུ ū IPA: [uː]	◌ེ ē IPA: [eː]	◌ཻ ai IPA: [aːɪ~ɛː]	◌ོ ō IPA: [oː]	◌ཽ au IPA: [aːʊ~ɔː]
ཀ ka IPA: [kə]	ཀཱ kā IPA: [kɑː]	ཀི ki IPA: [kɪ]	ཀཱི kī IPA: [kiː]	ཀུ ku IPA: [kʊ]	ཀཱུ kū IPA: [kuː]	ཀེ kē IPA: [keː]	ཀཻ kai IPA: [kaːɪ~kɛː]	ཀོ kō IPA: [koː]	ཀཽ kau IPA: [kaːʊ~kɔː]

== Evolution ==
Since Pakistan gained control of the region in 1948, Urdu words have been introduced into local dialects and languages, including Balti. In modern times, Balti has no native names or vocabulary for dozens of newly invented and introduced things; instead, Urdu and English words are being used in Balti.

Balti has retained many honorific words that are characteristic of Tibetan dialects and many other languages.

Below are a few examples:

Ordinary Balti	Text Writing	Honorific	Ladakhi	Meaning
Ata	اتا	Bawa/buwa/Baba	Aba	Father
kho	کھو	kho	kho	he
gashay	گشے	liakhmo	liakhmo	Beautiful
paynay	پینے	khumul	paynay	Money
bila	بلا	Bila	bila	Cat
su	سُو	su	su	Who
Ano/Amo	انو/امو	Zizi	Ama	Mother
Kaka	ککا	Kacho	Acho	Brother (elder)
Bustring	بُسترنگ	Zung	Nama	Woman / Wife
Momo	مومو	Jangmocho	Ajang	Maternal uncle
Nene	نےنے	Nenecho	Anay	Aunt
Bu	بُو	Bucho	butsha	Son
Fru	فُرو	Nono	thugu	Boy
Apo	اپو	Apocho	Meme	Grandfather
Api	اپی	Apicho	Abi	Grandmother
Ashe	اشے	Ashcho	achay	Sister (elder)
Zo	زو	bjes	Zo	Eat
Thung	تُھونگ	bjes	Thung	Drink
Ong	اونگ	Shokhs	Yong	Come
Song	سونگ	Shokhs	Song	Go
Zair	زیر	Kasal-byung	Zer	Speak/Say
Ngid tong	ݨِت تونگ	ghzim tong	Ngid tong	Sleep (go to)
Lagpa	لقپا	Phyaq-laq/g	Lagpa	Hand/Arm
Khyang	کھیانگ	Yang/Yari-phyaqpo	Khyorang	You
Kangma	کنگما	gzok-po	kangba	Leg

== Literature ==
Some epics and sagas appear in oral literature, such as the Epic of King Gesar and the stories of rgya lu cho lo bzang and rgya lu sras bu. All other literature is in verse. Balti literature has adopted numerous Persian styles of verse and vocables.

Nearly all the languages and dialects of the mountain region in the north of Pakistan, such as Pashto, Khowar and Shina, are Indo-Aryan or Iranic languages, but Balti is one of the Sino-Tibetan languages. As such, it has little in common with neighboring languages except some loanwords absorbed as a result of linguistic contact. Balti and Ladakhi are closely related.

The major issue facing Balti literature is its centuries-long isolation from Tibet and even from its immediate neighbor, Ladakh, due to political divisions and strong religious differences. Separated from its linguistic kin, Balti is under pressure from more dominant languages such as Urdu. This is compounded by the lack of a suitable means of transcription following the abandonment of its original Tibetan script. In recent couple of decades, Balti academics in Pakistan and Balti clerical scholars in Pakistan and Iran (as Balti people are Shia Muslim and thus cultrually connected with Iran's religious centers) have been working towards standardizing and unifying the Perso-Arabic script (on basis of Urdu orthography, but with additional letters); whereas other Balti academics have attempted (albeit with less popularity) to revive the Tibetan script (but with additional letters for loanwords of Urdu, Persian, Arabic, and English origin). Despite such attempts, the homogenizing pressure of Urdu on Pakistan's minority languages makes the spread of Balti literacy quite a difficult task.

Example of poetry:

Youq fangsay thalang paqzi na mandoq na mabour na
Na drolbi laming yani si soq fangse chi thobtook

— Nasir Karimi

== Sample Text ==
=== Al-Fatiha (الفَاتِحَةِ) ===
Below is the first sura (chapter) of the Quran, Al-Fatiha, its original Arabic text, English translation, as well as the Balti translation, as published (un-edited) in 2011 by Yusuf Hussain Abadi.

English translation

1. In the name of Allāh, the Entirely Merciful, the Especially Merciful!
2. [All] praise is [due] to Allāh, Lord of the worlds,
3. The Entirely Merciful, the Especially Merciful,
4. Sovereign of the Day of Recompense!
5. It is You we worship and You we ask for help!
6. Guide us to the straight path,
7. The path of those upon whom You have bestowed favor, not of those who have earned [Your] anger or of those who are astray.

Balti (Arabic script)

١-تھومید مہربان لیگی رحم چن خدائی میݩی کھہ۔
٢-ستود کھہ چوق خدا لہ بیورمو اِن، میول کنی اشی پا اِنمی۔
٣-تھومید مہربان لیگی رحم چن اِنمی۔
۴-زدئے مِنمی ڃغي رگو اِنمی۔
۵-یاݩ ژالہ ݩیاسی بلَن چھَوبید، یَݩ یاݩ ژے شیدانہ ݩیاسی روخ ژلید۔
۶-یاݩی سی ݩیا تراݩمو لم پوئے کھہ یوق۔
۷-دے خَپو فوقپہ سَوݩ کھَن مين می، ھنہ لم ستور لہ سَوݩ کھَن مين می، یاݩی سی نعمت شیزدے بیاسفی دے مژھوݩی لم پوئے کھہ یہ۔

Surah Al-Fatihah (Source) (1:1-7)

١-بِسْمِ اللَّهِ الرَّحْمَٰنِ الرَّحِيمِ
٢-الْحَمْدُ لِلَّهِ رَبِّ الْعَالَمِينَ
٣-الرَّحْمَٰنِ الرَّحِيمِ
٤-مَالِكِ يَوْمِ الدِّينِ
٥-إِيَّاكَ نَعْبُدُ وَإِيَّاكَ نَسْتَعِينُ
٦-اهْدِنَا الصِّرَاطَ الْمُسْتَقِيمَ،
۷-صِرَاطَ الَّذِينَ أَنْعَمْتَ عَلَيْهِمْ غَيْرِ الْمَغْضُوبِ عَلَيْهِمْ وَلَا الضَّالِّينَ

== See also ==
- Akhone Asgar Ali Basharat
- Sart

== Bibliography ==
- Bashir, Elena L. (2016). "Perso-Arabic adaptions for South Asian languages". In Hock, Hans Henrich; Bashir, Elena (eds.). The languages and linguistics of South Asia: a comprehensive guide. World of Linguistics. Berlin: De Gruyter Mouton. pp. 803–9. ISBN 978-3-11-042715-8.
- Pandey, Anshuman (2010). Introducing Another Script for Writing Balti (PDF) (Report).
- Rangan, K (1975). Balti Phonetic Reader. Central institute of Indian languages.
- Muhammad Yousuf Hussainabadi, 'Baltistan per aik Nazar'. 1984.
- Hussainabadi, Mohamad Yusuf. Balti Zaban. 1990.
- Muhammad Hassan Hasrat, 'Tareekh-e-Adbiat;.
- Muhammad Hassan Hasrat, Baltistan Tehzeebo Saqafat.
- Muhammad Yousuf Hussainabadi, 'Tareekh-e-Baltistan'. 2003.
- Engineer Wazir Qalbi Ali, 'Qadam Qadam Baltistan'. 2006.
- "A Short Sketch of Balti English Grammar" by Ghulam Hassan Lobsang, 1995.
- Everson, Michael. ISO/IEC JTC1/SC2/WG2 N2985: Proposal to add four Tibetan characters for Balti to the BMP of the UCS Archived 5 August 2019 at the Wayback Machine. 2005-09-05
- Read, A.F.C. Balti grammar.London:The Royal Asiatic society, 1934.
- Sprigg, Richard Keith. Balti-English English-Balti dictionary. Richmond: RoutledgeCurzon, 2002.
- Backstrom, Peter C. Languages of Northern Areas (Sociolinguistic Survey of Northern Pakistan, 2), 1992. 417 pp. ISBN 969-8023-12-7.
