= Ladakhi language =

Tibetic language spoken in Ladakh, India

Ladakhi
- ལ་དྭགས་སྐད; La-dwags skad
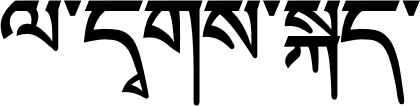
- La-dwags skad in Tibetan Script
- Native to: India
- Region: Ladakh
- Ethnicity: Ladakhis
- Native speakers: 110,826 (2011 Census)
- Language family: Sino-Tibetan: Tibeto-Burman; Tibeto-Kanauri (?); Bodish; Tibetic; Ladakhi–Balti; Ladakhi
- Writing system: Tibetan script

Official status
- Official language in: India: Ladakh

Language codes
- ISO 639-3: Variously: lbj – Ladakhi zau – Zangskari cna – Changthang
- Glottolog: kenh1234
- ELP: Ladakhi
- Ladakhi is classified as Vulnerable by the UNESCO Atlas of the World's Languages in Danger

The Ladakhi language also called Bhoti or Bodhi is a Tibetic language spoken in the Indian union territory of Ladakh. It is the predominant language in the Buddhist-dominated district of Leh, and a minority language in the district of Kargil.

Ladakhi has several dialects: Lehskat, named after Leh where it is spoken, Shamskat, spoken northwest of Leh, Stotskat, spoken in the Indus valley and which unlike the others is tonal, Nubra, spoken north of Leh, the Changthang language, spoken in the Changtang region by the Changpa people, and the Zangskari language, spoken in the Zanskar region of Ladakh.

== Name ==
The Ladakhi language (Tibetan: ལ་དྭགས་སྐད་, Wylie: La-dwags skad) is also referred to as Bhoti or Bodhi. Supporters of the Bhoti name hold a "lumper" view of the language: they use the term "Bhoti" to refer to Classical Tibetan and treat as the one, proper form of Tibetic languages across the Himalayas. This section of Ladakhi society has demanded inclusion Bhoti to the 8th Schedule of the Indian Constitution. They say that Bhoti is spoken by Ladakhis, Baltis, Tibetans, and throughout the Himalayas from Baltistan to Arunachal Pradesh.

The name Bhoti or Bodhi has connotations with Tibetan Buddhism, a major religion in the area. Many Ladakhi people contest this classification as there are also Muslim, Christian, Hindu and Sikh speakers of Ladakhi.

== Dialects ==
The dialects of Ladakhi are:

- Lehskat, named after Leh where it is spoken.
- Shamskat, spoken northwest of Leh in the sham region of ladakh.
- Stotskat, spoken in the upper Indus valley of ladakh and which unlike the others is tonal.
- Nubraskat, spoken north of Leh in the nubra region of Ladakh.

== Classification ==
Nicolas Tournadre considers Ladakhi, Balti, and Purgi to be distinct languages on the basis of mutual intelligibility (Zangskari is not as distinct). As a group they are termed Ladakhi–Balti or Western Archaic Tibetan.

Zangskari is a dialect of Ladakhi spoken in Zanskar and also spoken by Buddhists in the upper reaches of Lahaul (Himachal Pradesh) and Paddar (Paldar). It has four subdialects, Stod, Zhung, Sham, and Lungna. It is written using the Tibetan script by Buddhists and the Arabic script by Muslim and Christian Ladakhis.

== Phonology ==
=== Consonants ===
		Labial	Dental	Alveolar	Retroflex	Palatal	Velar	Glottal
Nasal		m	n̪			ɲ	ŋ	
Plosive/ Affricate	voiceless	p	t̪	t͡s	ʈ	t͡ʃ	k	
Plosive/ Affricate	aspirated	pʰ	t̪ʰ	t͡sʰ	ʈʰ	t͡ʃʰ	kʰ	
Plosive/ Affricate	voiced	b	d̪	d͡z	ɖ	d͡ʒ	ɡ	
Fricative	voiceless			s	ʂ	ʃ		h
Fricative	voiced			z		ʒ		
Trill				r				
Lateral	plain			l				
Lateral	murmured			lʱ				
Semivowel		w				j		

- /b d ɡ/ can fricative sounds [β ð ɣ] as allophones that occur within free variation.
- /k/ has an allophone of a retracted velar stop [k̠].
- /l r/ can have allophones [l̥ r̥] when occurring initially before a voiceless consonant.

=== Vowels ===
Ladakhi has a regular five vowel system, but with [a] being replaced with [ə], making it unusual, as most languages have [a].

	Front	Central	Back
Close	i		u
Mid	e	ə	o

Vowels with allophones
	Front	Central	Back
Close	i		u
Close-mid	e		o
Mid	[ɛ̝]	ə	[ɔ̝]
Open-mid		[ɐ]	
Open		[ä]	

- Allophones of /ə/ in word-final position are heard as [ä ɐ].
- Allophones of /e o/ are heard as [ɛ̝ ɔ̝].
- Allophones occur in free variation.

== Script ==
Ladakhi is usually written using Tibetan script, and the pronunciation of Ladakhi is much closer to written Classical Tibetan than that of most other Tibetic languages. Ladakhis pronounce many of the prefix, suffix and head letters that are silent in many other Tibetic languages, in particular the Central Tibetan. This tendency is more pronounced to the west of Leh, and on the Pakistani side of the Line of Control, in Baltistan. Although the pronunciation is relatively conservative, the Ladakhi language has accumulated significant grammatical differences from the classical, written language.

The question of whether to write colloquial Ladakhi (phalskat) in the Tibetan script or to write an only slightly Ladakhified version of Classical Tibetan (choskat) is controversial in Ladakh. Muslim Ladakhis speak Ladakhi but most do not read the Tibetan script. Most Buddhist Ladakhis can sound out the Tibetan script but do not understand Classical Tibetan, yet many Ladakhi Buddhist scholars insist that Ladakhi must be written only in a form of Classical Tibetan, seeing the vernacular-based orthography only as deviation from the "proper" language. A limited number of books and magazines have been published in colloquial Ladakhi, one example being Ladags Melong from SECMOL.

In Ladakhi language, it is customary to add the suffix 'le' at the end of sentences as a sign of respect towards the individual being spoken to. This linguistic convention is a way to express politeness and honor towards the listener, emphasizing the cultural values of respect and courtesy.

Written Ladakhi is most often romanised using modified Wylie transliteration, with th denoting an aspirated dental t, for example.

== Grammar ==
=== Nouns ===
Ladakhi nouns inflect for number and case. There are two numbers: singular (unmarked) and plural (indicated by -kun, -gun or -sək). For example:

khəŋpə → {khəŋpəgun/khəŋpəkun/khəŋpəsək}
house {} houses

Plurality is usually unmarked when it is clear from context.

There are 7 cases:

- direct case
- ergative case
- dative case
- instrumental case
- associative case
- ablative case
- genitive case
