= List of villages in Kargil district =

Revenue villages of Kargil
- Category: Revenue villages
- Location: Kargil district
- Number: 45 revenue villages
- Government: Administration of Ladakh
- Subdivisions: Kargil Shakar Chiktan

This is a list of villages in Kargil district in Ladakh, India. Kargil district is divided into 4 tehsils, namely, Kargil, Shargole, Shakar Chiktan and Sodh. There are a total of 45 revenue villages in the 4 tehsils.

== Kargil tehsil ==
- Poyen
- Kaksar
- Karkit
- Drelong (Latoo)
- Chuliskamboo
- Hardass
- Shilikchey
- Bagh Khumani
- Kargil
- Baroo
- Minjee
- Choskore
- Safi
- Batambis
- Pashkum

== Shargole tehsil ==
- Shargole
- Lochum
- Darket
- Tacha
- Karit
- Numunchey
- Kukstay
- Skamboo
- Khachey
- Karamba
- Phoo
- Tingdoo
- Wakha
- Mulbekh

== Shakar-Chiktan tehsil ==
- Stakchey
- Shakar
- Samrah
- Chiktan
- Hagnis
- Sanjak
- Lamsoo Sandoo
- Youkma Kharboo

== Sodh tehsil ==
- Yourbaltak
- Akchamal
- Apatee
- Tumail
- Barchey
- Silmoo
- Lalung
- Chulichan
