= Haji Anayat Ali =

Indian politician and a hotelier

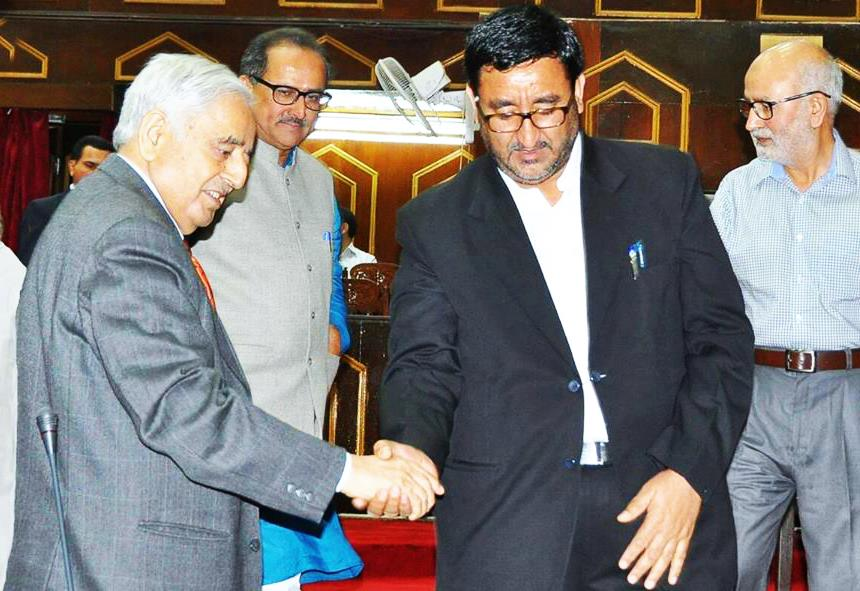
- Mufti Mohammed Sayeed and Haji Anayat Ali during his oath ceremony on being elected as Chairman of J&K Legislative Council on 12 April 2015. Dr Nirmal Singh and Naeem Akhtar are in the background.

Chairman, Jammu and Kashmir Legislative Council
- In office 12 April 2015 – 16 October 2019
- Preceded by: Amrit Malhotra
- Succeeded by: Council Abolished

Personal details
- Born: Kargil, Ladakh, India
- Party: BJP (from 26 August 2019); PDP (to 26 August 2019)

Haji Anayat Ali is an Indian politician and a hotelier from the Kargil, Union territory of Ladakh. He was the last Chairman of the Jammu and Kashmir Legislative Council, the upper house of the bicameral legislature of erstwhile State of Jammu and Kashmir before its abolishment.

== Political career ==
In the 2002 J&K state Legislative Assembly Elections, the election campaign of the future first Cabinet Minister from Kargil, Haji Nisar Ali was launched from the transport office compound of Haji Anayat Ali which was a huge success. In the 2008 Legislative Assembly Elections, Haji Anayat Ali's support in the capacity of Youth Wing President of Islamia School Kargil, proved beneficial for National Conference in securing victory over the two MLA seats of the district. The 2008 LAHDC Kargil elections had also went in favor of the candidates whom he supported.

In the 2009 Indian General Elections the MP seat of Ladakh went to Haji Ghulam Hassan Khan, the independent candidate supported by Islamia School Kargil with Haji Anayat Ali as its youth wing President.

In late 2014, Haji Anayat Ali joined the Jammu and Kashmir Peoples Democratic Party which was considered a reckless move at the time as PDP had no support base in Kargil. However the inclusion of a third option on the political scene of Kargil was well received by the masses.

The 2014 Assembly Election results established PDP as a prominent political factor in the complex and competitive political equation of Kargil district as despite losing the elections it managed to gather almost 30% of the total vote cast. In early 2015 he was nominated as Member of the Legislative Council J&K, representing Kargil.

On 12 April 2015, he was nominated as the Chairman of the Council.

On 26 August 2019, he left PDP to join Bharatiya Janata Party in its New Delhi Headquarters.

On 16 October 2019, Legislative Council was abolished after the reorganisation of Jammu and Kashmir. Ali was the last Chairman of the Council.
