= Poyen =

Poyen may refer to:

- Charles Poyen (died 1844), French mesmerist
- Poyen, Arkansas, a town in the United States
- Poyen, Kargil, a village in India
