= Shiekh Muhammad Mufeed =

Sheikh Muhammad Mufeed
- Title: Hujjatul Islam wal Muslimeen

Personal life
- Born: Muhammad Mufeed; 1912 Yourbaltak, Sodh Kargil district, India
- Died: 20 November 1996 (aged 83–84) Kargil, Kargil district, India
- Cause of death: Illness
- Resting place: Chanchik, Kargil
- Era: Modern Era
- Region: Kargil Ladakh, India
- Main interest(s): Islamic Philosophy, Shia Theology
- Notable work: Founded the Houza Ilmiya Isna Ashariya at Kargil - Ladakh
- Education: Houza ilmiya, Najaf

Religious life
- Religion: Islam
- Jurisprudence: Ja`fari
- Creed: Twelver Shi`a Islam

Sheikh Muhammad Mufeed (c. 1912 – 20 November 1996) was a Shia Islamic religious scholar/alim from the erstwhile state of Jammu and Kashmir and present Union Territory of Ladakh, and the founder of Anjuman Jamiatul Ulama Isna Asharia, Kargil. He was deeply influenced by system of dissemination of Islamic teachings at the Hauza Ilmiya Najaf where he spent fifteen years of his life. In 1953 Shiekh Mufeed established an Islamic Seminary along with other prominent religious scholars of those time.

== Personal life ==
Sheikh Mufeed was born into the Khantey Pa family of Yourbaltak, Kargil in the year 1912. His father's name was Malik. He was born after the death of his father. At a very young age, he left for the city of Najaf in Iraq to pursue religious education. He spent fifteen years of his life at the seminary in Najaf. Then he came back to Kargil and started teaching students at his home. Due to the lack of a proper Islamic seminary, students from around the district would come to his place to get tutored in the ways of Islam.

He married the daughter of a prominent religious scholar from Minjee Hujjatul Islam Shiekh Ali Naqi. Three of his sons died in infancy. His only surviving child was his daughter. His daughter was married to Sheikh Mussa Shariefi.
