= Oligodon theobaldi =

Conservation status
- Least Concern (IUCN 3.1)

Scientific classification
- Kingdom: Animalia
- Phylum: Chordata
- Class: Reptilia
- Order: Squamata
- Suborder: Serpentes
- Family: Colubridae
- Genus: Oligodon
- Species: O. theobaldi

Binomial name
- Oligodon theobaldi (Günther, 1868)

Synonyms
- Simotes theobaldi Günther, 1868; Oligodon theobaldi — Wall, 1923

Species of snake

Oligodon theobaldi, commonly known as the Mandalay kukri snake or Theobald's kukri snake, is a species of snake in the family Colubridae. The species is endemic to Asia.

== Etymology ==
The specific name, theobaldi, is in honor of British herpetologist William Theobald.

== Geographic range ==
O. theobaldi is found in Bangladesh, India (Assam), Myanmar (formerly called Burma), and Thailand.

== Habitat ==
The preferred natural habitat of O. theobaldi is forest, at altitudes of 220–680 m (720–2,230 ft).

== Description ==
O. theobaldi may attain a snout-vent length (SVL) of 39 cm (15 in). Its coloration resembles that of a garter snake.

== Reproduction ==
O. theobaldi is oviparous.
