= Namika La =

Mountain pass in the Indian Himalayas

- Location within Ladakh Location within India
- Elevation: 3,700 metres (12,100 ft)
- Traversed by: Srinagar-Leh highway

Third Approach
- Location: Ladakh, India
- Range: Himalaya, Zanskar Range
- Coordinates: 34°23′00″N 76°27′37″E

Namika La (Wylie: gnam gyi ka la; "Pillar of the Sky Pass") is a high mountain pass in the Zaskar Range of the Himalayas in Ladakh, India, at an elevation of 3,700 m or 12,139 ft. It is traversed by the Srinagar-Leh highway.

Namika La is one of two high passes between Kargil and Leh. The other is the even higher Fotu La Pass.

The western approach to the pass is via the Wakha Rong valley, making a detour to a waterless branch valley of it above the village of Mulbekh. To the east of the pass is another branch valley (Saraks Lungpa) of the Sangeluma river valley in the vicinity of Bodh Karbu. Namikala pass, located at the Zanskar range that connects Srinagar- Leh highway. This pass located at the height of 12,139 feet above the sea level is also known as the pillar of the sky passes.
