= William Theobald =

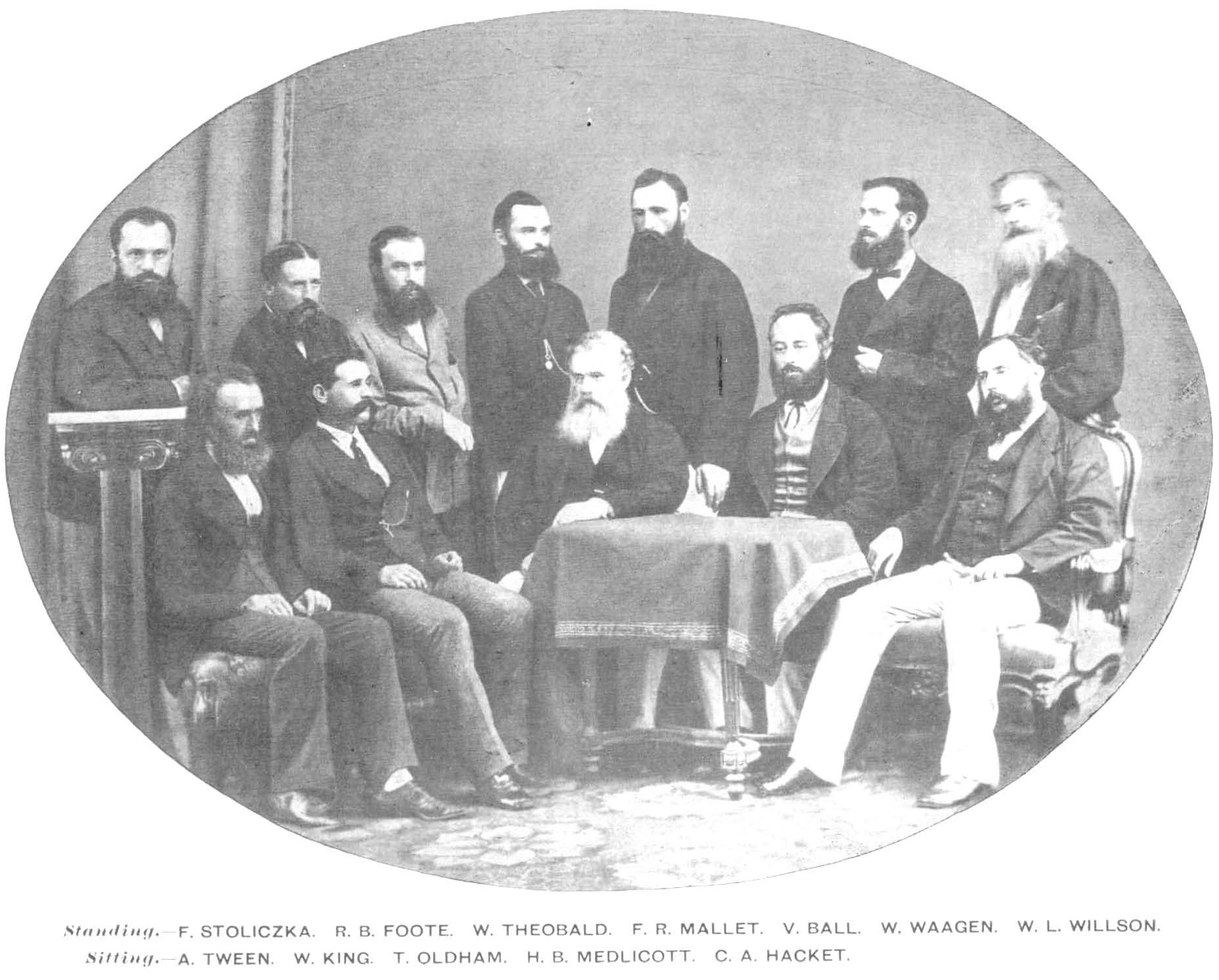
Members of the Geological Survey of India in 1870: F. Stoliczka, R. B. Foote, W. Theobald, F. R. Mallet, V. Ball, W. Waagen, W. L. Wilson (standing); A. Tween, W. King, T. Oldham, H. B. Medlicott, C. A. Hackett (sitting)

William Theobald (1829 – 31 March 1908) was a malacologist and naturalist on the staff of the Geological Survey of India serving in Burma, then a part of British India.

== Biography ==
Very little is known of Theobald's early life. Theobald was referred to in official documents as "William Theobald, Junior". He arrived in Calcutta on the ship Hindostan via the Suez in March 1847 and worked as a volunteer in the coal exploration of the upper Damodar and Son valleys under David Williams. During this time Joseph Hooker visited him and they spent time together. Later Theobald became an assistant to John McClelland who took over the exploration from David Williams. He went to Burma in 1855 as a staff of the Geological Survey of India and took over the Pegu survey. He returned Bengal on completion of the survey in 1873 to be appointed Deputy Superintendent of Bengal in 1876. From 1868 to 1876 he described a dozen new species of reptiles.

Theobald was the first to publish a full catalogue of reptile specimens collected in British India, Descriptive Catalogue of the Reptiles of British India (1876), although Anderson claimed that several new descriptions by Edward Blyth were overlooked by this work. Theobald's work on Indian freshwater snails with illustrations was one of the first of its kind. He even made his shell collections available to Francis Mason for his epic work on the flora and fauna of British Burma titled Burmah, its People and Natural Productions. The third edition of this work was completely rewritten by Theobald and was published in two volumes under the title Burma, its people and productions; or notes on the fauna, flora and minerals of Tenasserim, Pegu and Burma (Hertford, England, 1882 & 1883). The first volume of this work covered geology, mineralogy and zoology and was exclusively written by him while the second volume relied on several important botanical works of his time. The phanerogamic information came from printed works of Sulpiz Kurz on the Burmese flora and from the entries in Edward Balfour's works. He also relied on Le Maout's and Decaisne's general system of botany translated by Mrs. Hooker and on Gamble's Manual of Indian Timbers. However, his efforts at reforming botanical nomenclature conflicted with the British Botanical establishment at that time a majority in British India and his botanical works were largely disregarded.

He retired from the service in June 1881 and died at Ilfracombe, Devon, England on 31 March 1908. A photograph of him as member of a group of the Geological Survey of India was published in the Centenary publication of the Geological Survey of India.

== Legacy ==
Theobald is commemorated in the scientific names of two Asian reptiles: Oligodon theobaldi and Phrynocephalus theobaldi.

== Bibliography ==
- 1860. Catalogue of the recent shells in the Museum, Asiatic Society of Bengal
- 1868. Catalogue of reptiles in the Museum of the Asiatic Society of Bengal
- 1876. Descriptive catalogue of the reptiles of British India
- 1876. Conchologia Indica: Illustrations of the Land and Freshwater Shells of British India Along with Sylvanus Charles Thorp Hanley. Malacological Society of London.
- 1889. Index of the genera and species of Mollusca in the hand list of the Indian Museum. 1-2. Gastropoda, Calcutta.
- 1896. On the authorship of the sonnets attributed to Shakespeare. An inquiry into the respective claims of Bacon, Sir Philip Sidney, and others, to be their author
