= Pashkum, Kargil =

Pashkum Kargil in Ladakh in India

Pashkum Pashkyum
- Village
- Location of Pashkum in Ladakh, India Pashkum (India)
- Coordinates: 34.5167°N 76.1833°E
- Country: India
- Union territory: Ladakh
- District: Kargil
- Tehsil: kargil

Population (2011)
  - Total: 3,419
- Time zone: UTC+05:30 (IST)

Pashkum (also spelled Pashkyum) is a large village in the Kargil district of the Union territory of Ladakh, India.

== Demographics ==
According to the 2011 Census of India, Pashkum recorded a total population of 3,419 across approximately 505 households.

Demographics of Pashkum (2011 Census)
Parameter	Total	Male	Female
Population	3,419	1,836	1,583
Children (0–6 years)	435	235	200
Literacy Rate	75.34%	86.2%	62.76%
Scheduled Tribes	3,373	1,798	1,575

The majority of the population is ethnic Purigpa and Ladakhis. The principal spoken language is Purgi (a dialect of Bhoti), while Urdu, Hindi, and English are used in administration and education.

== See also ==
- Tourism in Ladakh
- Kargil
