= Sheikh Mussa Shariefi =

Sheikh Muhammad Mussa Shariefi
- Title: Hujjatul Islam wal Muslimeen

Personal life
- Born: Muhammad Mussa; 1942 Akchamall, Kargil district, India
- Died: 11 December 2013 (aged 70–71) Chanchik, Kargil district, India
- Cause of death: Illness
- Resting place: Chutumail, Kargil
- Era: Modern Era
- Region: Ladakh, India
- Main interest: Islamic Philosophy
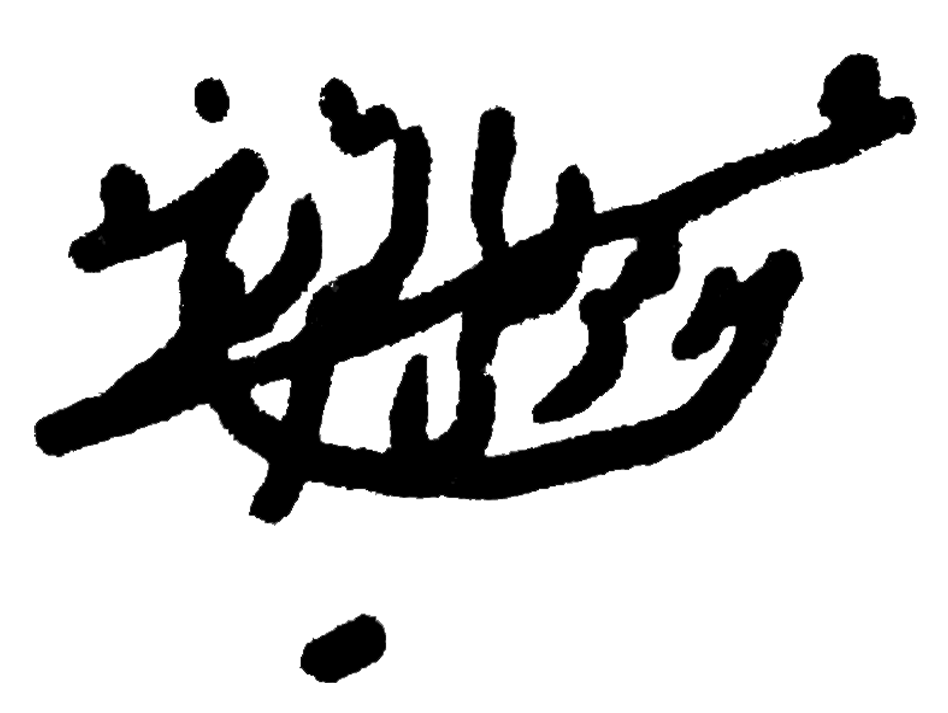
- Signature

Religious life
- Religion: Islam
- Jurisprudence: Ja`fari
- Creed: Twelver Shi`a Islam

Hujjatul Islam Sheikh Muhammad Mussa Shariefi (1942 – 11 December 2013) was a senior Islamic Twelver Shia religious scholar/alim from the Kargil district of Ladakh. He was renowned for his philosophical and mystical Friday prayer sermons which were always attended by thousands of people from the length and breadth of Kargil. He became the Imam e Jumu'ah of Jamia Masjid Kargil after the death of the immensely popular Shia mystic and scholar, Hujjat ul Islam wal Muslimeen Aqa Sheikh Khanteypa. He gained immense popularity for his usage of the local dialect for delivering his Friday sermons.
He was one of the last members of a group of religious scholars from Kargil who attained higher Islamic Studies in the Hawza 'Ilmiyya Najaf, before the rule of Ba'ath Party in Iraq. He is renowned for his piety and his role in propagating Islam and establishing numerous Islamic institutions in Kargil.

== Early life ==
Sheikh Muhammad Mussa Shariefi was born in 1942 in the village Akchamal, near Kargil in the state of Jammu and Kashmir, India.

== Education and positions ==
Shariefi received his basic education in religious studies from Sheikh Rahmatullah, a religious scholar from Akchamal. On completion of the basic course of the Quran and Islamic studies (Diniyat) in Kargil, he migrated to Najaf in Iraq for higher studies. He stayed in Iraq for 20 years and served there as a religious teacher (mudarris). He returned to India in 1971 and continued his religious services as a teacher. He was associated with the Islamia School Kargil and offered services as the Principal, Huzia Ilmia for about a decade and then served as the Imam of the Jamia Masjid Kargil. His sermons from the Jamia Masjid Kargil have always been a source of inspiration for the people.

== Death ==
Shariefi died after a brief illness on 11 December 2013, aged 71 years, at his residence in Chanchik. He was buried in Chutumail the day after. More than 25,000 people attended his funeral.

== See also ==
- Ghulam Rasool Noori
