= Islamia School, Kargil =

Socio-religious organisation

Jamiat-ul-Ulama Isna Asharia Kargil-Ladakh
- جمعیة العلماء اثنا عشریہ کرگل, لداخ
- Formation: 1953
- Founder: Hujjatul Islam Sheikh Muhammad Mufeed
- Type: Socio-Religious
- Legal status: Registered Society
- Headquarters: Kargil
- Region served: Ladakh
- Services: Religious, Educational and Social
- Official language: Urdu, Balti
- President: Sheikh Nazir Mehdi Mohammadi
- Vice-President: Sheikh Ghulam Ali Mufeed
- General Secretary: Sheikh Ibrahim Khalili
- Imam -e- Jummah: Sheikh Ibrahim Khalili
- Key people: Sheikh Mussa Shariefi, Shiekh Ahmed Mohammadi, Sheikh Mufeed,
- Website: juiak.org

Jamiat-ul-Ulama Isna Asharia, Kargil-Ladakh is a socio-religious institution of Kargil, Ladakh in Indian Administered Kashmir catering mainly to the socio-religious needs of the region. It was founded in 1953, and has jurisdiction over Ulemas of the region and deputes them to villages where they guide people in religious matters, run Madrasas and works as prayer monitors. It also organises the Friday prayers in the Kargil town.

== About ==
Jamiat ul Ulama Isna Asharia Kargil-Ladakh is the largest Islamic organization of Ladakh and oldest body of religious leaders, mainly Ághas and Sheikhs, to be established in the region. The population of the region is mainly Shia Muslim therefore a need for an institution to look over and into the religious matters of the masses was felt and Jamiat-ul-Ulama Isna Asharia Kargil-Ladakh was established. Elections for the executive body were held on 11 September 2021 and Hojjatul Islam Sheikh Nazir Mehdi Mohammadi was re-elected as the president for the second time.

== Subsidiary Organs ==
1. Ulama Council: It is the chief body of Shia clerics in the district.
2. The institution's sub organ Howza-e-Ilmiyah Isna Asharia', Kargil is affiliated with the Al-Mustafa International University, Qom. It provides religious education to a selected number of students and prepares them for higher religious studies.
3. Jamiat ul Ulama Mashhad office Islamic Republic of Iran, branch of Jamiat ul Ulama Isna Asharia Kargil-Ladakh.
4. Jaffaria Academy of Modern Education is a prominent higher secondary school of the region.
5. Maktab e Isna Asharia (Daar ul Quran ) governs and provides Quranic education in seminaries in many villages.
6. Jawadiah Project CARE : It is an educational project to support a selected number of students from poor financial backgrounds and to groom them for various competitive exams.
7. Az-Zahra Girls Orphanage is run by the Jamiat ul Ulama Isna Asharia catering to the orphans of the region.
8. Haye"te Fatimiyah is the women's wing.
9. Isna Asharia Network formally known as Media Cell ISK: It takes care of all the issues pertaining to public and media relations.
10. Ansar ul Mahdi Isna Asharia Youths.انصار المہدی جوانان اثنا عشریه
11. Shoba e Adab, Poetry and Publishing wing founded by the renowned writers and Poets of the district.
12. Al Reza Health Care & Research Foundation. Health Wing.
13. Hawza Ilmiyah Jamiat-ul-Batool, Women's College for Islamic Education.
14. Khitmat Guzaraan e Ahlulbait (a.s), (Servants of the Ahl al-Bayt) The committee of goodness. Helping poor families around the region by providing them their basic needs.
15. Al Askari Disaster Management Jamiat ul Ulama Isna Asharia Kargil-Ladakh
