= Chulichan =

- village
- Location in Ladakh, India Chulichan (India)
- Coordinates: 34.663323°N 76.315108°E
- Country: India
- Union Territory: Ladakh
- District: Kargil
- Tehsil: Sodh

Area
  - Total: 1.2590 km^{2} (0.4861 sq mi)

Population (2011)
  - Total: 912
  - Density: 724/km^{2} (1,880/sq mi)

Languages
  - Official: Brokskat
- Time zone: UTC+5:30 (IST)
- PIN: 194103

Chulichan (Alternative spellings: Chulichang and Chulichen. ) is a village in the Kargil district of Ladakh, India, close to the Line of Control with Pakistan-administered Kashmir. It is populated by Shia Brokpas and Baltis.

== Geography ==
Chulichan is on the left bank of the Indus River in a narrow section of Indus valley known as Brog Yul. It is the last village in Indian-administered Ladakh; the next village on the left bank, Natsara, is in Pakistan-administered Baltistan. Chulichan has an area of 125.90 hectares (1.2590 km^{2}) and includes five hamlets: Groung Khril, Groung Stod-I, Groung Stod-II, Sharchey and Grongjuk.

== History ==
Historically, Chulichan and the adjacent regions were populated by Brokpa people. Folklore maintains that they arrived at their current habitat from the Gilgit region. The Brokpa chieftains wielded autonomy in the region, pledging nominal allegiance to the Maqpon rulers of Skardu.

However, things changed in the seventeenth century when Jamyang Namgyal of Ladakh had a conflict with Ali Sher Khan Anchan of Skardu and had to accept Gurgurdho, a hamlet on the opposite bank of the Indus river, as a boundary between their territories. Consequently, Chulichan and villages to the north of it, such as Ganokh and Marol, became part of Baltistan and influenced by Shia Islam. When Robert Barkley Shaw visited the village in 1876, he found Baltis and Brokpas living there, professing Shia Islam.

Nevertheless, the local Brokpas continued to maintain marital relations with their ethnic kin in the Dah Hanu region of Ladakh; such connections would cease only with the latter's acceptance of Buddhism c. late nineteenth century. In the aftermath of the First Kashmir War (1947–1948), with Pakistan annexing territories north of Chulichan, it became the only Brokpa village in India to be primarily composed of Muslims.

== Demographics ==
According to the latest census of India (2011), the village has 912 inhabitants across 112 households.

== See also ==
- Ganokh
- Garkon
- Dha
- Darchik
- Hanoo
