= Arghons =

Human settlement in India

The Arghons are a small community of descendants of immigrants from Yarkand and Kashmir that have intermingled with the local Ladakhi community, residing mainly in Leh and Kargil towns of Ladakh, India. They are Sunni Muslims.

They first arrived as traders and merchants from Central Asia and Kashmir in the early 17th century. Most were traders but some were artisans, scribes and clerics. Most central Asian merchants returned home at the end of the caravan season. Those who remained and settled in Ladakh married native Ladakhis and their descendants are now known as Arghons.

Today most Arghons are merchants, although few have taken to agriculture. Most of them today speak the Ladakhi language but are also conversant in Turkic and Tibetan.

== See also ==
- Tibetan Muslims
- Kashmiri Muslims
- Uyghurs
