= Mulbekh Monastery =

Buddhist monastery in Ladakh, India

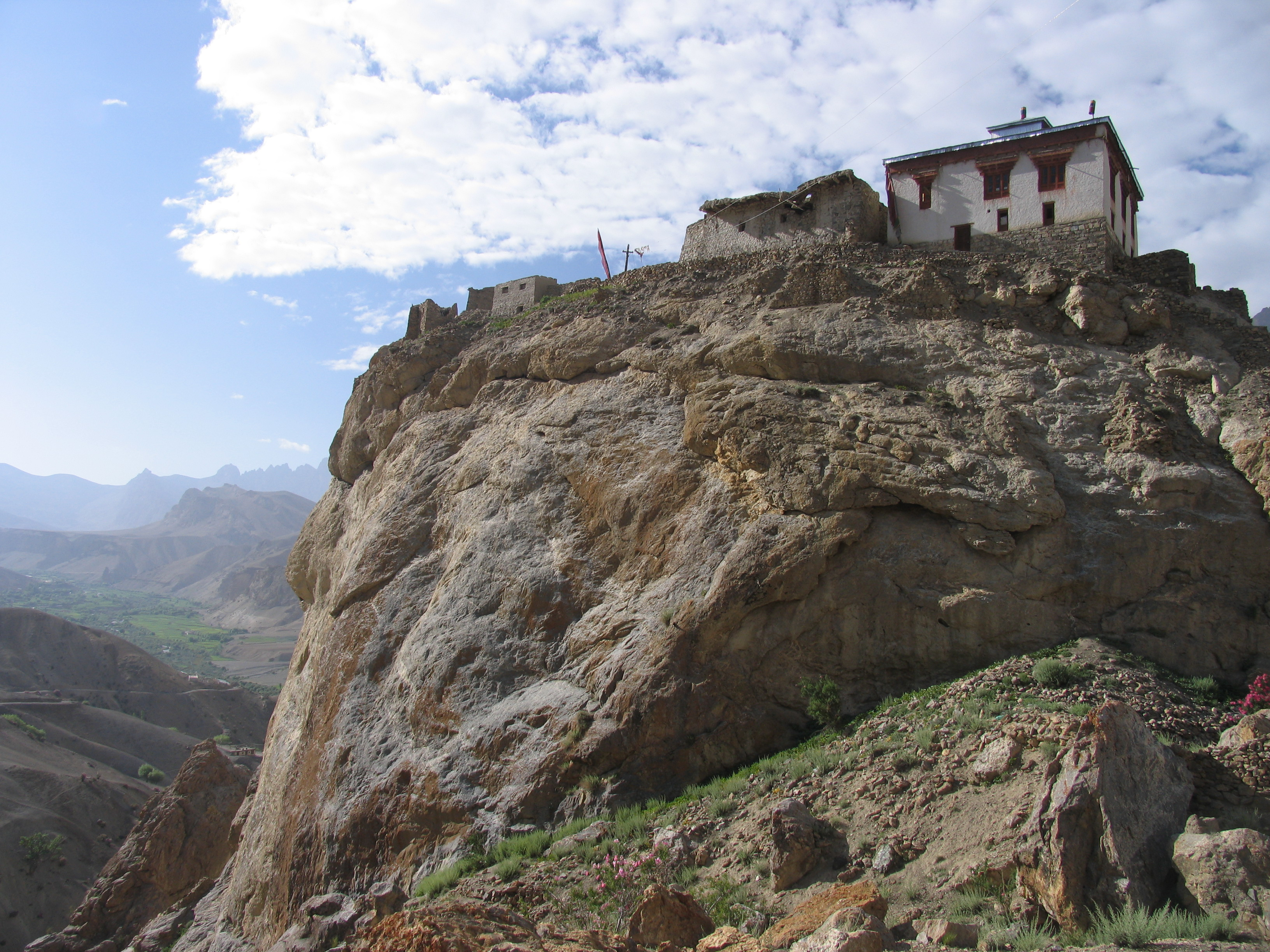

- Location in Ladakh, India

Religion
- Affiliation: Tibetan Buddhism
- Sect: Drukpa and Gelug

Location
- Location: Kargil, Ladakh, India
- Interactive map of Mulbekh Monastery
- Coordinates: 34°23′0″N 76°22′0″E

Architecture
- Style: Tibetan Architecture

Mulbekh Monastery or Mulbekh Gompa, at 11,495 ft from sea level and 656 ft uphill from road level, consists of a 9 m (30 ft) tall Maitreya Buddha statue, 1400 CE kharosti language edicts on the hill, and two 800-year-old gompas: Serdung gompa of Drukpa lineage and Rgaldan-se gompa of Gelugpa lineage of Buddhism. It is found 40 km from Kargil on NH1 Kargil-Leh Highway in the Kargil district of Ladakh in northern India. The monastery has large prayer wheels, and the view en route to the cliff monastery has been described as beautiful. Rgaldan-se Gompa, established by Tungba Lzawa who is also known as Agu Tungba, was renovated in 2016. Nyima Lhakhang temple was built around 800 years ago in the oldest section of the Mulbekh Monastery by the students of the great Tibetan scholar Lotsawa Rinchen Zangpo, and it houses Lhakhang (sacred objects).

== Description ==
The double gompas are dramatically situated at the very top of a crag 200 metres (656 ft) above the road. They were connected with the nearby palace of Rajah Kalon of Mulbekh below. They may be reached by a steep footpath winding up from behind.

The altitude of the town at the foot of the crag is given as 3,304 m. (10,839 ft), which makes the altitude of the gompas 3,504 m. (11,495 ft). Its population is given as 5,730.

== Mulbekh Chamba: Rock-cut cliff-face statue of Buddha ==
It is one of the three tallest rock-cut relief statues of Buddha in Ladakh, which are collectively also known as the "Bamyan Buddhas of Ladakh".

Around 45 kilometres east of Kargil town on NH-1 heading toward Leh, is the famous rock-cut Chamba Statue in Mulbekh village, a striking enormous figure carved into the rock face on the right-hand side of the road. It is a 9 m (30 ft) tall Maitreya Buddha (Buddha who will be reborn, also called the "chamba" in local language) statue overlooking the old trade route and modern highway. It dates to the Kushan period, from 1 century BCE to 6th century CE, predating Tibetan Buddhism and now-destroyed 6th century Buddhas of Bamiyan of Afghanistan. Modern scholars date it as being from around the eighth century. Unfortunately, the lower part of the statue is partly obscured by a small temple built in 1975.

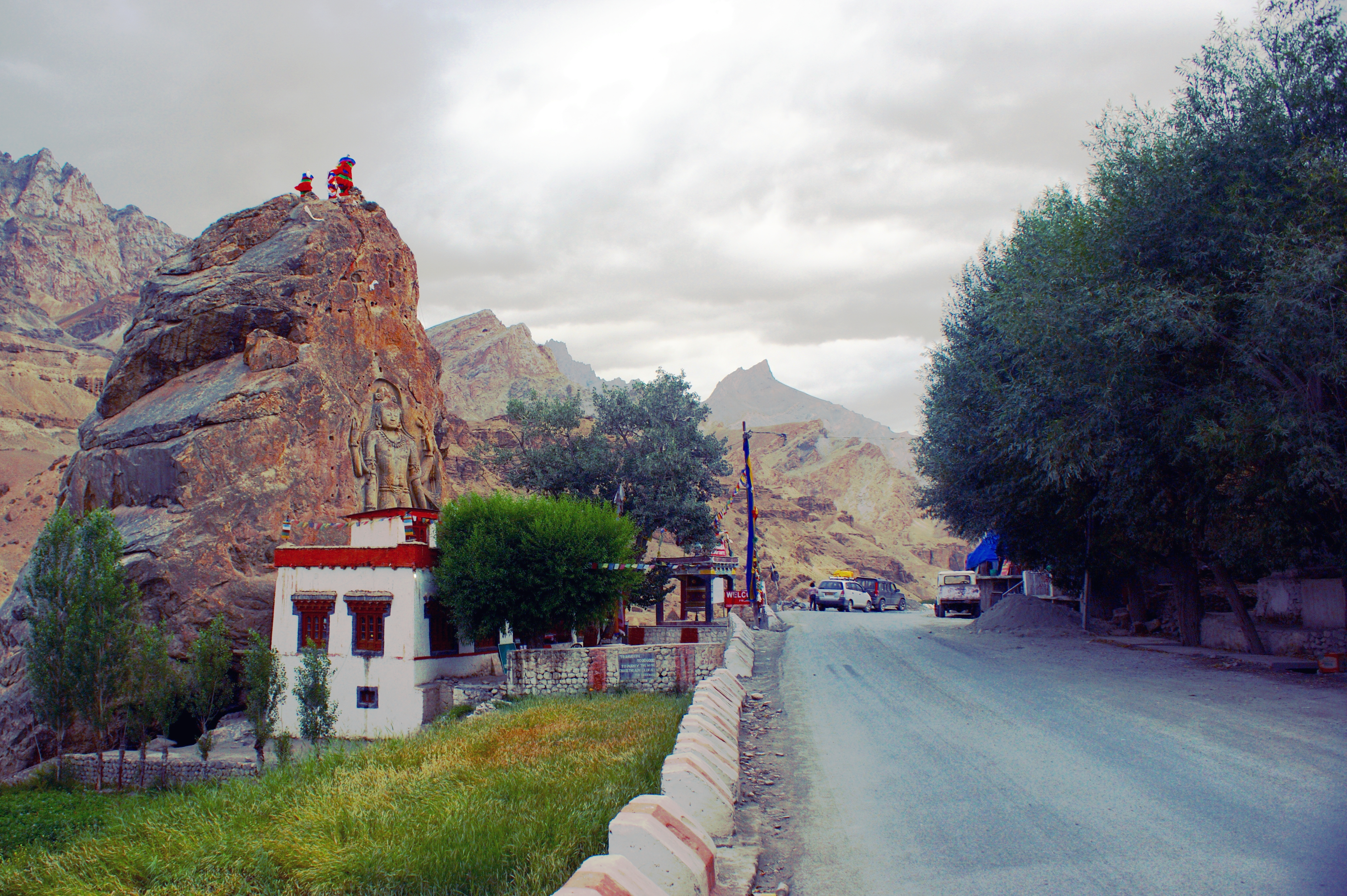
Rock with Chamba statue

== Rock inscription of King Bhum Ide ==
Nearby are some ancient rock inscriptions or edicts written in Kharosthi script. It issues an edict to the local people to discontinue sacrificing goats by King Bhum Ide (Tsongkapa), who ruled western Ladakh c. 1400 CE, while his younger brother, Dragspa, ruled the rest. Tsongkapa, titled Bhum Ide, was a king and great reformer of Buddhism. He lived in Ladakh from 1378 to 1441 CE. He set up monasteries near Leh at Spitok, Sangkar, Phiang (Fiang) and Trigtse. He started from the earlier Buddhist sources and removed the discrepancies from the current practices. He made the monks switch from Red Hat sect (identified by the red hats they wear) to Yellow Hat sect. One of his successors, King Trashi (1500-1530 CE), also made it mandatory for Ladakhi families to send at least one or two children to become monks, who did not have to be the eldest child.

Every year, at least once or twice in each village the heart was torn out of a living goat in front of an altar. King Lde had the following inscription carved:

Oh Lama (Tsongkapa [1378-1441 CE]), take notice of this! The king of faith, Bum lde, having seen the fruits of works in the future life, gives orders to the men of Mulbe to abolish, above all, the living sacrifices, and greets the Lama. The living sacrifices are abolished."

The people of Mulbekh found this too onerous to follow, for beside King Lde's edict, on the same rock, is an inscription saying the order was too hard to be executed. "For what would the local deity say, if the goat were withheld from him?"

== See also ==
- List of buddhist monasteries in Ladakh
- Geography of Ladakh
- Tourism in Ladakh
