= Poyen, Ladakh =

Poyen Poyan
- Town
- Location in Ladakh, India Poyen (India)
- Coordinates: 34°33′44″N 76°07′53″E
- Country: India
- Union Territory: Ladakh
- District: Kargil
- Tehsil: Kargil

Government
  - Type: UT of Ladakh

Population (2011)
  - Total: 216

Languages
  - Official: Ladakhi, Hindi, Purgi, English
  - Spoken: Ladakhi, Balti, Purgi
- Time zone: UTC+5:30 (IST)
- PIN: 194103

Poyen (Alternative spellings: Poyan and Poin) is a town in the Kargil district, Ladakh, in India, close to the Kargil town. It is on the right bank of Wakha Rong river near its confluence with the Suru River. The village jurisdiction includes the hamlets of Hunderman acquired from Pakistan during the Indo-Pakistan War of 1971.

== Demographics ==
According to the 2011 census of India, Poyen has 280 households. The literacy rate of Poyen is 62.43%. In Hardas, Male literacy stands at 75.27% while the female literacy rate was 50.00%.

Demographics (2011 Census)
	Total	Male	Female
Population	2500	1070	1090
Children aged below 6 years	27	14	13
Scheduled caste	0	0	0
Scheduled tribe	215	107	108
Literacy	62.43%	75.27%	50.00%
Workers (all)	38	35	3
Main workers (all)	8	–	–
Marginal workers (total)	30	29	1

== Transport ==
=== Road ===
Poyen is well-connected by road to other places in Ladakh and India by the Srinagar-Leh Highway or the NH 1.

=== Rail ===
The nearest major railway stations are Sopore railway station and Srinagar railway station located at a distance of 218 kilometres and 224 kilometres.

=== Air ===
The nearest airport is at Kargil located at a distance of 12 kilometres but it is currently non-operational. The next nearest major airport is Leh Airport located at a distance of 220 kilometres.

== See also ==
- Ladakh
- Kargil
- Dras War Memorial
