= Chiktan =

Village in Kargil district, Ladakh, India

Chiktan Cig-tan
- Village
- Interactive map of Chiktan
- Location in Ladakh, India Chiktan (India)
- Coordinates: 34°28′13″N 76°30′37″E
- Country: India
- Union Territory: Ladakh
- District: Kargil
- Tehsil: Shakar Chiktan

Area
  - Total: 146.9 km^{2} (56.7 sq mi)

Population (2011)
  - Total: 1,285
  - Density: 8.747/km^{2} (22.66/sq mi)
- Time zone: UTC+5:30 (IST)
- Census code: 986

Chiktan or Chigtan (Wylie: cig tan, THL: chik ten) is a town in Kargil district, Ladakh, India. It is also the joint headquarters of the Shakar Chiktan tehsil. It is situated on the right bank of the Sangeluma river (also called Kanji River), a tributary of the Indus River, which it joins near Sanjak opposite the village of Dah. Chiktan was the capital of the Cig-tan principality of Ladakh for several centuries.

The Chiktan Fort, also known as Chiktan Khar, is a fort above the Chiktan village.

== History ==
Tibetologist A. H. Francke, who translated the Ladakh Chronicles, states that there were only two principalities in Purig (the northern Kargil district), in historical times, based at Chiktan and Kartse (Sankoo) respectively. That would imply that Chiktan controlled the major part of the Wakha Rong valley, possibly up to Pashkum.

North of the Srinagar-Leh Highway lie the ruins of Chiktan fortress, said to be taller and older than Leh Palace. Tahtah Khan, a prince of Baltistan, began its construction after he fled a failed assassination attempt. He took shelter in Chiktan in the 8th century. He wanted to construct a fort there but only managed to build a small palace.

Built in the 16th century by Balti craftsmen, the castle served as a royal residence for various kingdoms for centuries, as the region was amalgamated into successive neighboring kingdoms. Today, neglect and natural forces have reduced the fort to rubble.

Chiktan Castle is deep in a valley near the Indus River with mountains in its background. It is composed of rammed earth and stone masonry with mud mortar. Following the designs of architect and carpenter Shinkhen Chandan, the castle used timber to support the ceilings of the structure as well as to frame the doors and windows.

The palace was a masterpiece of Ladakhi and Tibetan architecture, famous across Lhasa. It reportedly had a room which that rotated, powered by blown air.

The Chiktan palace was inhabited by the king until Dogra King of Jammu annexed the area. He wanted to suppress the influence of the king and began to demolish the fort. Prepared for the attacks, Chiktan Castle was a symbol of unity, strength, brotherhood, and community for the peoples of the region. The castle was attacked several times during its history, but was not abandoned until the late 19th century. Neglect and natural elements have left the castle in an advanced state of decay. It was primarily local people who, over the years, took building materials from the site for their own use. This ongoing removal of materials significantly contributed to the ruinous condition of the palace seen today.

Seeing this neglect, the people of the village started began to use the wood of the fort as resource also, which slowly destroyed it. Stories of ghosts were spread to stop people from exploiting the fort. As the capital of the Chiktan region, the castle was a significant political center and military fortification, and remains an important symbol of the shared history and culture of the region.
