= Apati, Ladakh =

Apati
- Village
- Apatee
- Interactive map of Apati
- Location in Ladakh, India Apati (India)
- Coordinates: 34°34′08″N 76°12′44″E
- Country: India
- Union Territory: Ladakh
- District: Kargil
- Tehsil: Sodh

Area
  - Total: 110.9 km^{2} (42.8 sq mi)

Population (2011)
  - Total: 1,245
  - Density: 11.23/km^{2} (29.08/sq mi)

Languages
  - Official: Hindi, English
  - Spoken: Purgi
- Time zone: UTC+5:30 (IST)
- Census code: 967

Apati (Alternative spelling: Apatee) is a village in Kargil district of the Indian union territory of Ladakh. It is in the Sod Valley close to the India–Pakistan border (LOC). The village is located 19 kilometres east of Kargil, on "Kargil-Batalik Road" on the bank of the Tumel Lungpa stream. Near the village is Apati Chamba, an ancient Maitreya Buddha statue from 7th–11th centuries carved on a mountain cliff.

== Demographics ==
According to the 2011 census of India, Apati has a population of 1245 people living in 142 households.

== Transport ==
Apati served by the Kargalik–Batalik–Khaltse Road, which passes by the north of the village. Kargil is 19 km away from Apati and Batalik is 41 km away.

The nearest major railway stations to Hardas is the Srinagar railway station located at a distance of 223 kilometres.

The nearest airport is at Kargil located at a distance of 18 kilometres, but it is currently not operational. The next nearest major airports are Srinagar International Airport and Leh Airport located at a distance of 219 kilometres and 225 kilometres.

== Maps ==
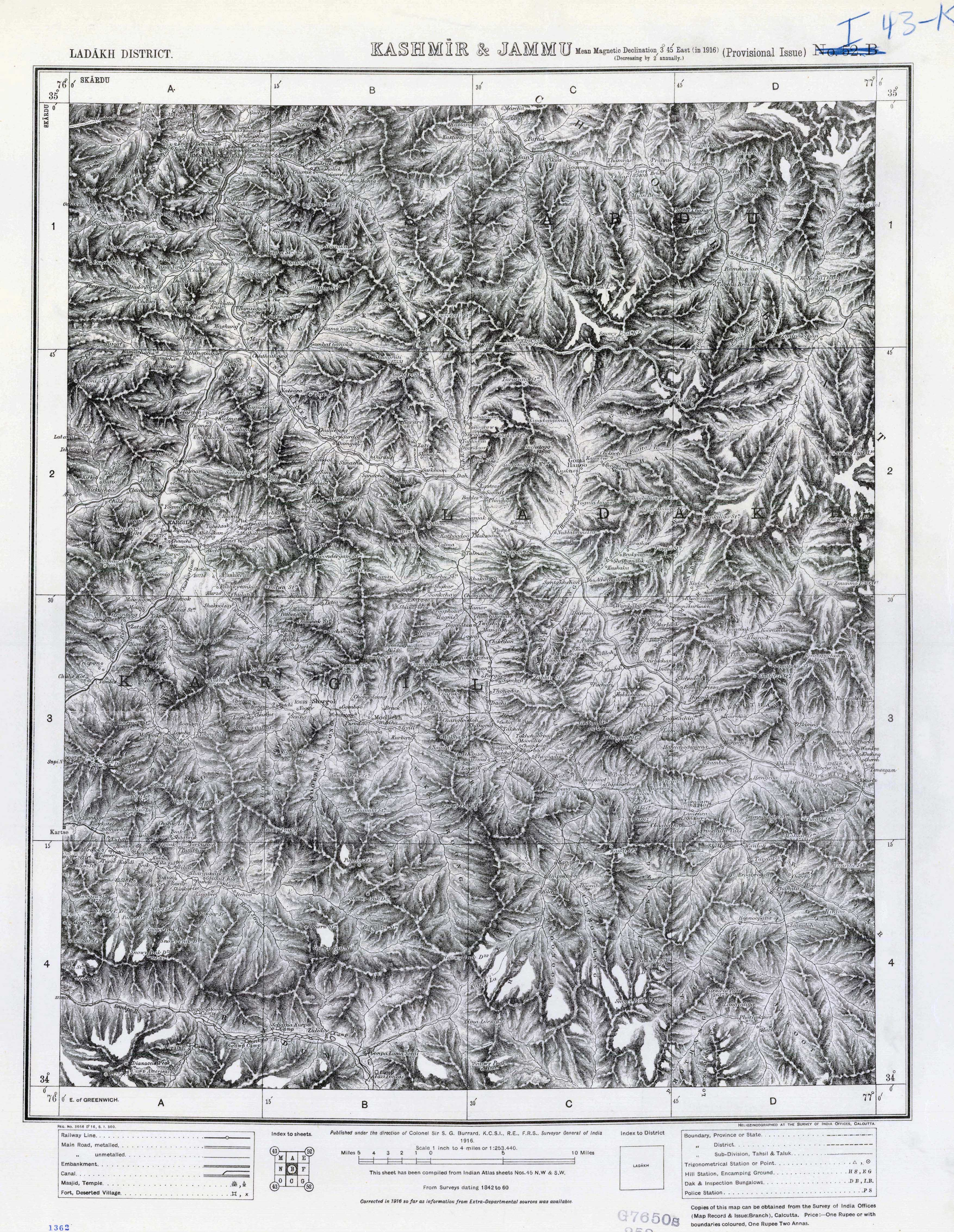
SoI, 1916 showing "Apathithang"

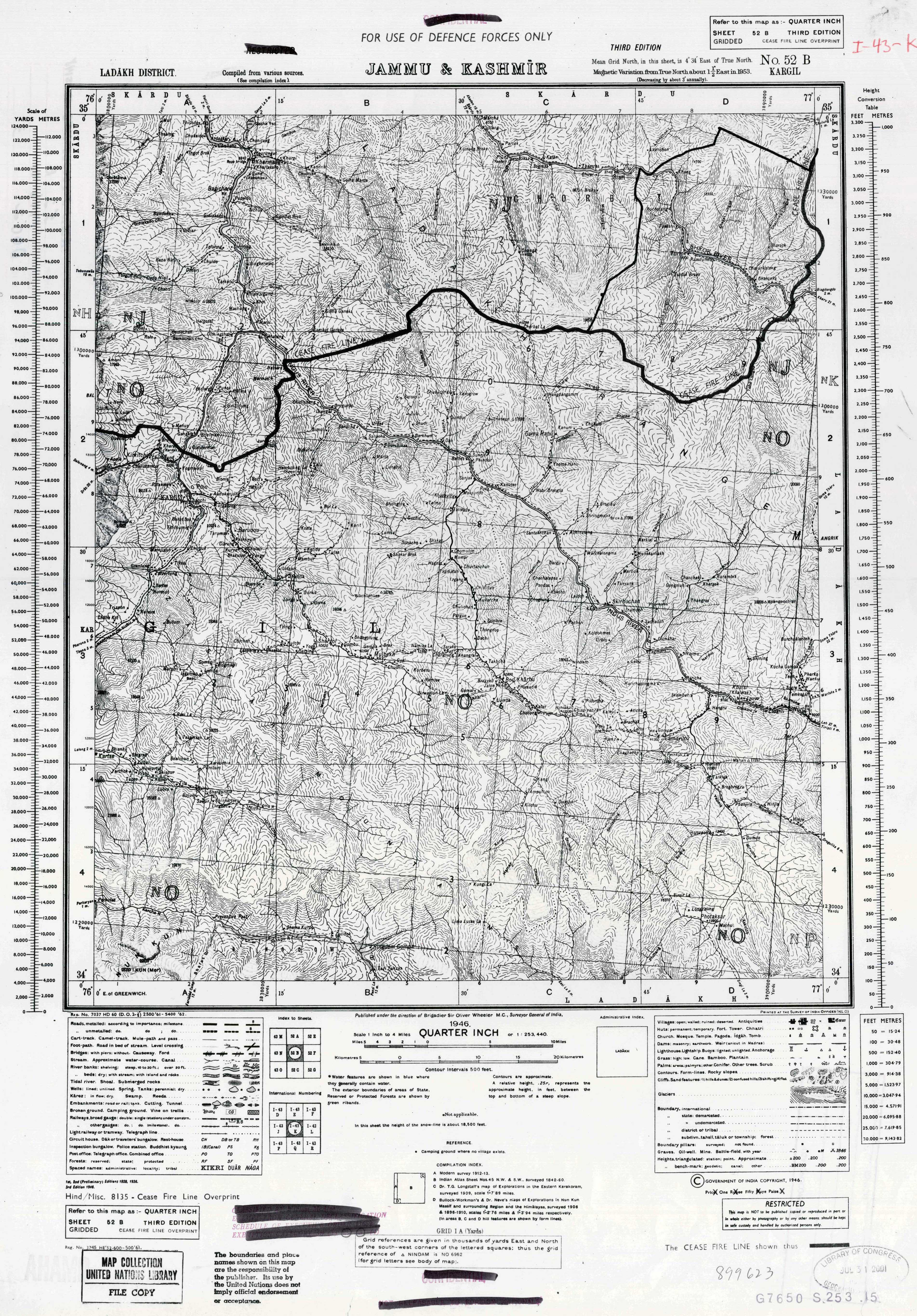
SoI map, 1946, showing the 1948 LoC. (Majit and Bert are neighbours)

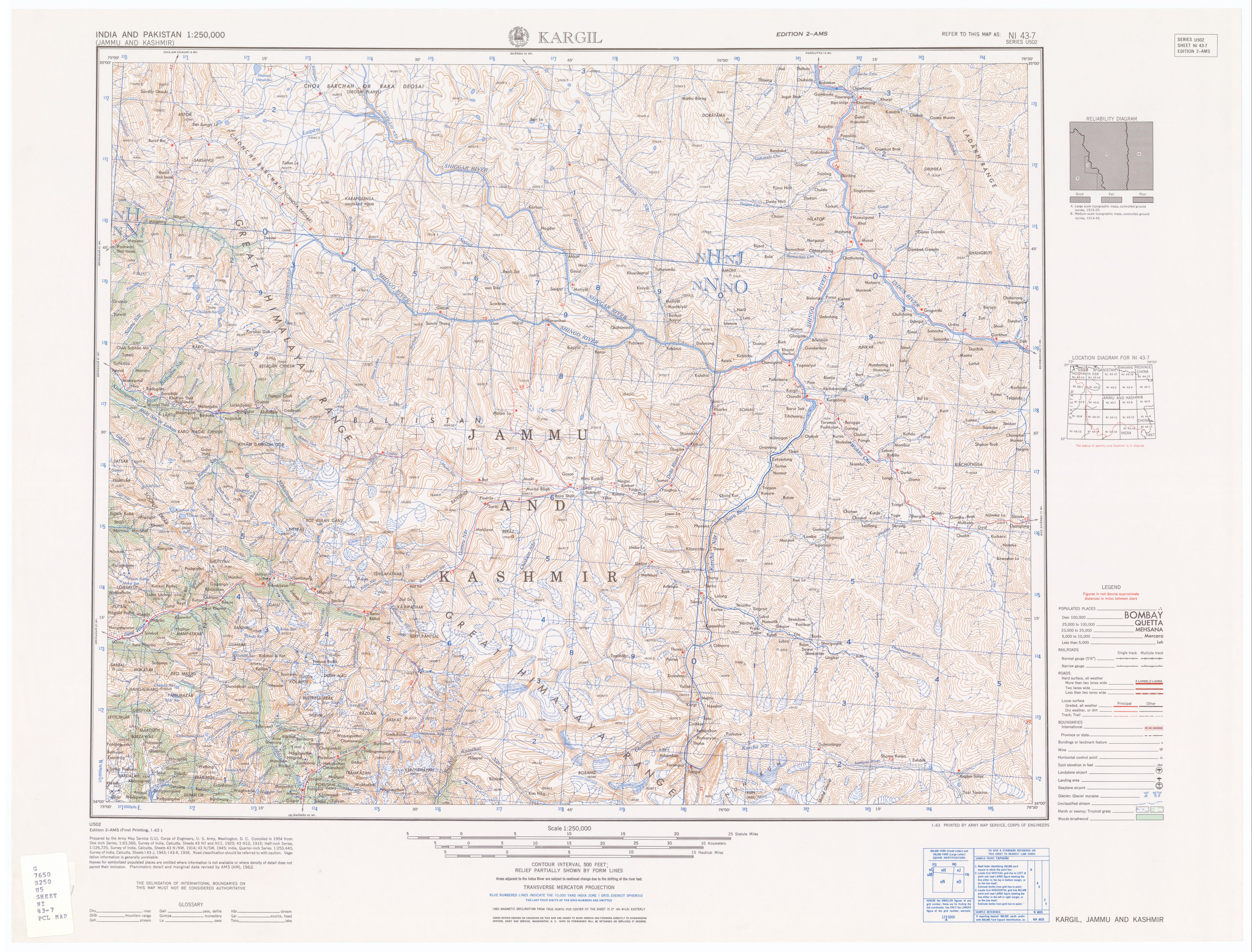
Map showing Majit and Bert (AMS, 1955)

== Apati Chamba: Rock-cut cliff-face statue of Buddha ==
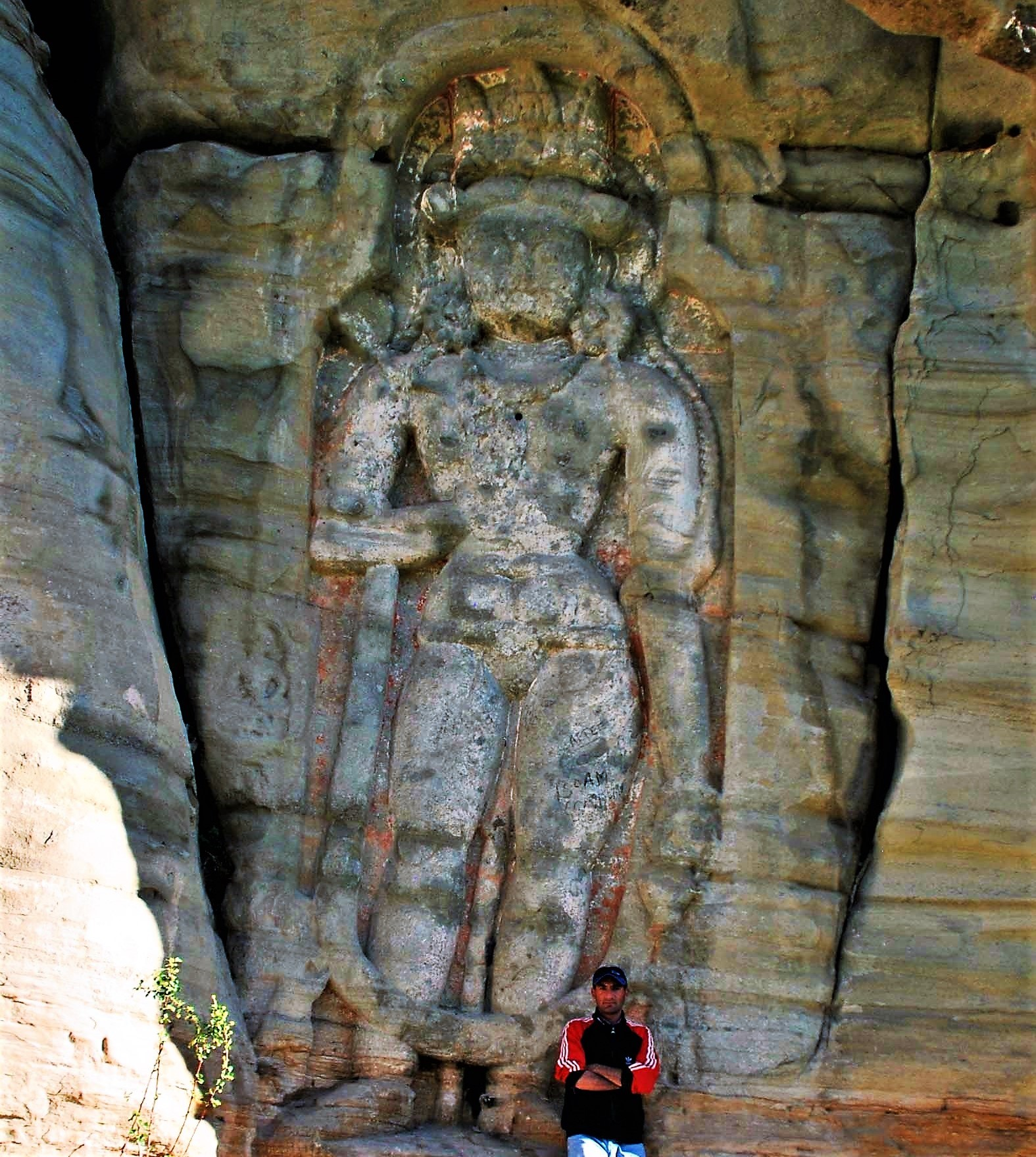
Maitreya Buddha statue near Apati.

Apati Chamba or Apati Buddha statue, is one of the three tallest rock cut relief statues of Buddha in Ladakh, which are collectively known as the "Bamyan Buddhas of Ladakh". It is a Maitreya Buddha (the Buddha who will be incarnated in the future, also called the "chamba" in local language) statue dating to 1 century BCE to 6th century CE, predating Tibetan Buddhism and 6th century Buddhas of Bamiyan of Afghanistan. It is most eroded and smallest of the three tallest rock statues of Ladakh.

== See also ==
- Hunderman
- Geography of Ladakh
- Tourism in Ladakh

== Bibliography ==
- Gazetteer of Kashmir and Ladak, Calcutta: Superintendent of Government Printing, 1890 – via archive.org
- District Census Handbook: Kargil (PDF), Directorate of Census Operations, Jammu and Kashmir, 2011, archived from the original (PDF) on 21 November 2017
- Linrothe, Rob (2015). "Origins of the Kashmiri Style in the Western Himalayas: Sculpture of the 7th—11th Centuries". In Carmen Mainert (ed.). Transfer of Buddhism Across Central Asian Networks (7th to 13th Centuries). BRILL. pp. 147–190. ISBN 978-90-04-30743-8.
