= Phrynocephalus theobaldi =

Conservation status
- Least Concern (IUCN 3.1)

Scientific classification
- Kingdom: Animalia
- Phylum: Chordata
- Class: Reptilia
- Order: Squamata
- Suborder: Iguania
- Family: Agamidae
- Genus: Phrynocephalus
- Species: P. theobaldi

Binomial name
- Phrynocephalus theobaldi Blyth, 1863
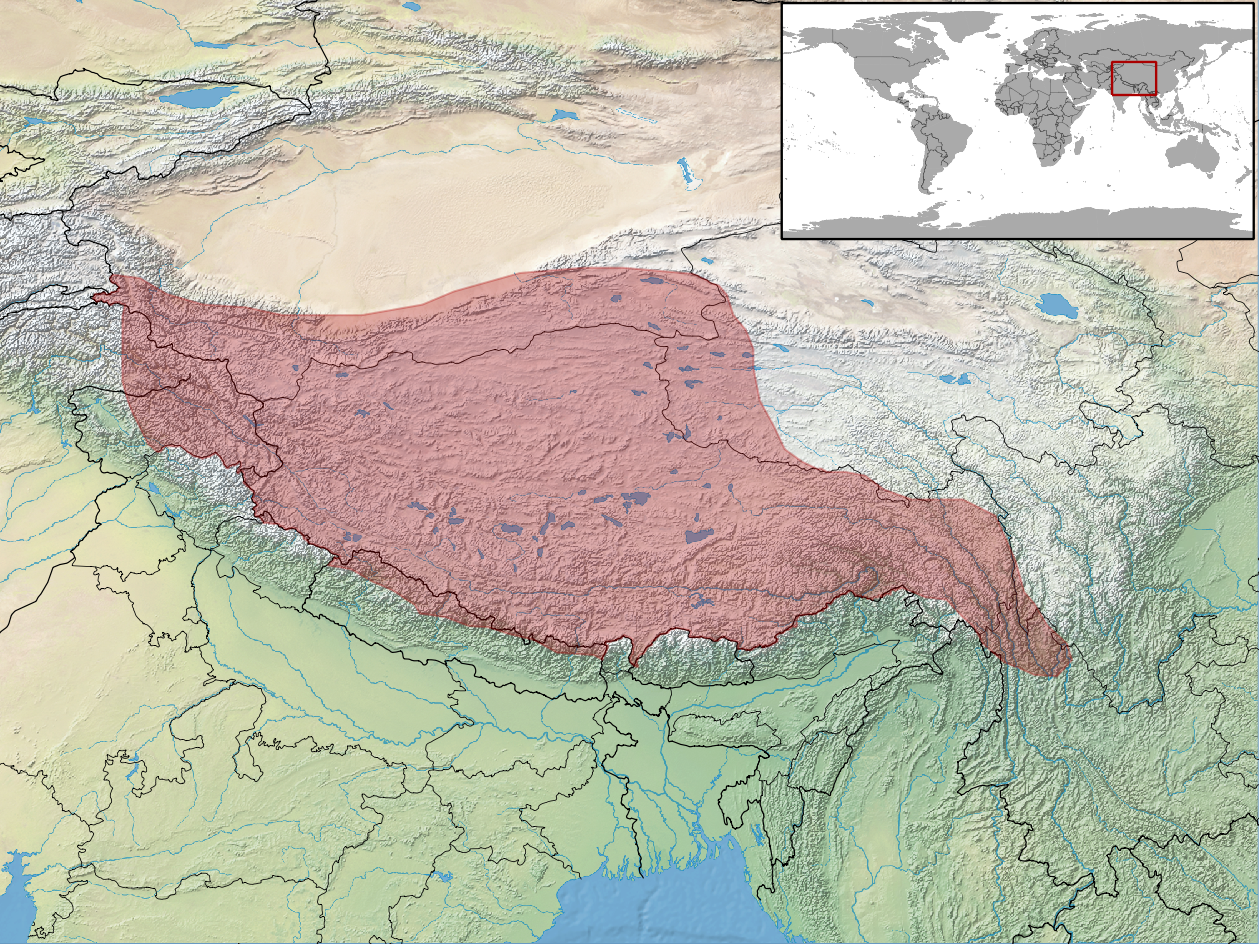

Synonyms
- Phrynocephalus stolickai Steindachner, 1867; Phrynocephalus caudivolvulus Anderson, 1872; Phrynocephalus vlangalii Var. lidskii Bedriaga, 1909; Phrynocephalus alticola G. Peters, 1984; Phrynocephalus zetangensis Wang et al., 1996

Species of lizard

Phrynocephalus theobaldi (common names: Theobald's toad-headed agama, snow lizard, and others) is a species of lizard in the family Agamidae. The species is endemic to Asia.

== Etymology ==
The specific name, theobaldi, is in honor of British naturalist William Theobald.

== Geographic range ==
P. theobaldi is found in eastern Turkestan, India (Kashmir and Ladakh), Nepal and western China (Xinjiang and southern Tibet).

Its type locality is "Lake Tso Moriri" = Tsho-marari, Rupshu, Ladakh.

== Habitat ==
The preferred natural habitats of P. theobaldi are desert, grassland, and shrubland, at altitudes of 2,700–4,200 m (8,900–13,800 ft).

== Reproduction ==
P. theobaldi is viviparous.
