= Shargole =

Shargole Shargol
- Tehsil and Village
- Location in Ladakh, India Shargole (India)
- Coordinates: 34.39°N 76.30°E
- Country: India
- Union Territory: Ladakh
- District: Kargil
- Tehsil: Shargole

Population (2011)
  - Total: 486

Languages
  - Official: Hindi, English
  - Spoken: Ladakhi, Urdu
- Time zone: UTC+5:30 (IST)
- PIN: 194109

Shargole is a medium-sized village and tehsil in Kargil district of the Indian union territory of Ladakh. The village is located 30 kilometres from district headquarters Kargil.

== Demographics ==
According to the 2011 census of India, Shargole has 75 households. The literacy rate of Shargole village is 77.67%. In Shargole, Male literacy stands at 88.39% while the female literacy rate was 65.48%.

Demographics (2011 Census)
	Total	Male	Female
Population	486	263	223
Children aged below 6 years	65	39	26
Scheduled caste	0	0	0
Scheduled tribe	486	263	223
Literacy	77.67%	88.39%	65.48%
Workers (all)	215	117	98
Main workers (all)	69	–	–
Marginal workers (total)	146	54	92

== Transport ==
=== Road ===
Shargole is connected to other places in Ladakh by the NH 1.

=== Rail ===
The nearest railway station to Shargole is Sopore railway station located at a distance of 250 kilometres. The nearest major railway station to Shargole is Jammu Tawi railway station located at a distance of 517 kilometres.

=== Air ===
The nearest airport is at Kargil located at a distance of 28 kilometres but it is currently non-operational. The next nearest major airport is Leh Airport located at a distance of 184 kilometres.

== See also ==
- Leh
