= Kargil district =

District of Indian-administered Ladakh, Kashmir region

- District of Ladakh administered by India
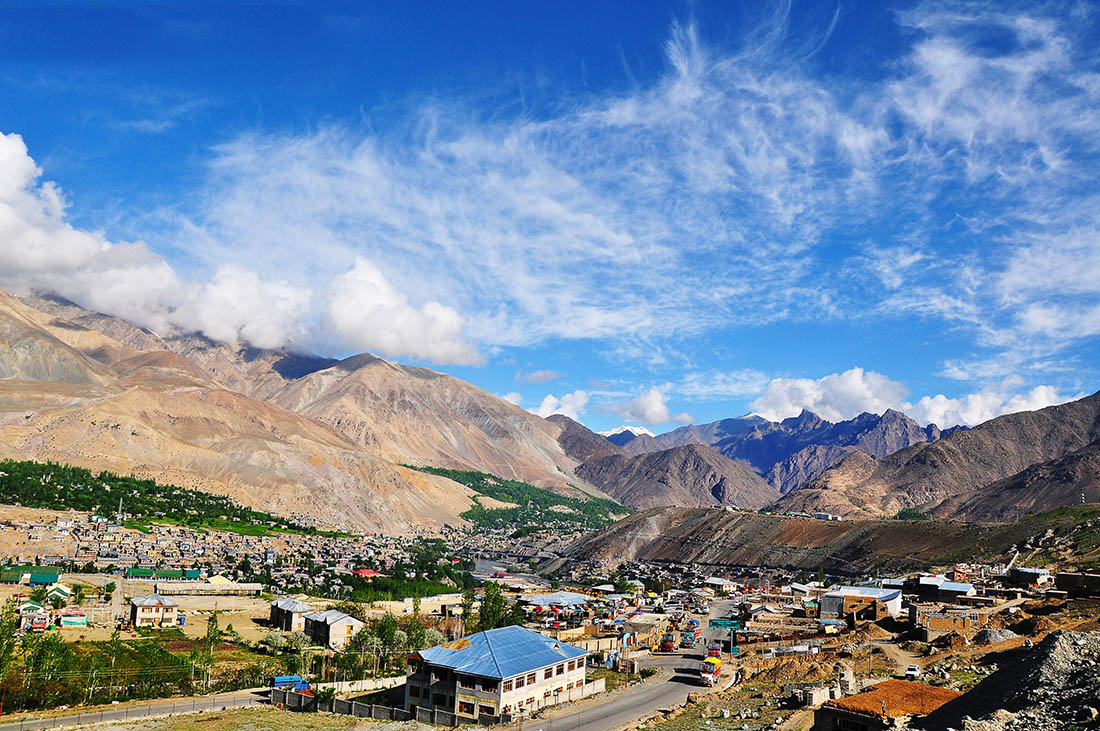
- View of Kargil Town

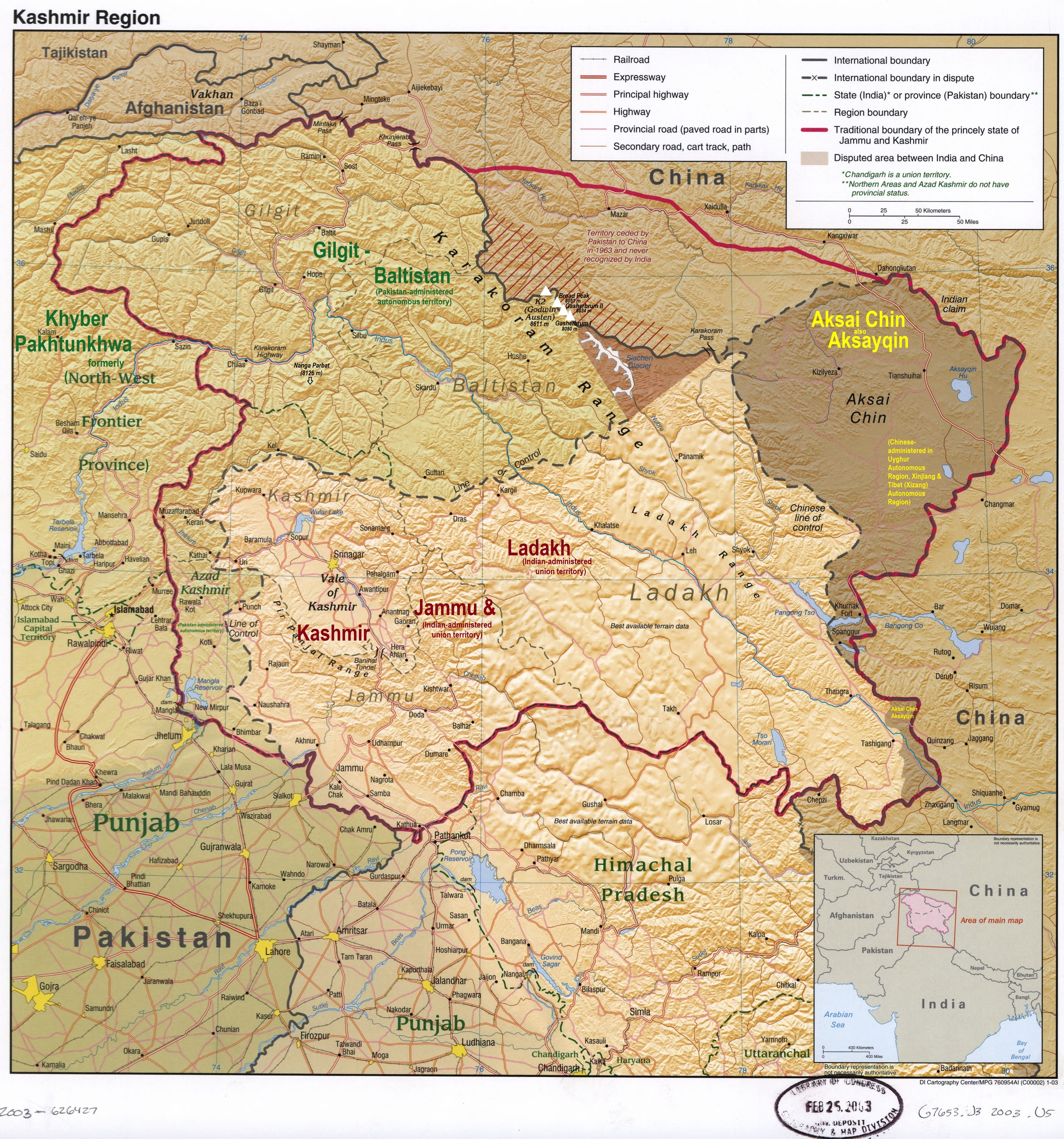
- A map showing Indian-administered Ladakh (shaded in tan) in the disputed Kashmir region

- Location of Kargil district in Ladakh
- Interactive map of Kargil district
- Coordinates (Kargil): 34.56°N 76.13°E
- Administering country: India
- Union Territory: Ladakh
- Capital: Kargil
- Established: 1 July 1979
- Headquarters: Kargil
- Tehsils: Kargil, Shargole, Shakar-Chiktan, Sankoo and Taisuru

Government
  - Deputy Commissioner: Rakesh Kumar, IAS
  - Chief Executive Councillor: Mohd Jaffer Akhoon, JKNC
  - Lok Sabha constituencies: Ladakh
  - MP: Mohmad Haneefa, Ind

Area
  - Total: 14,086 km^{2} (5,439 sq mi)

Population (2011)
  - Total: 140,802
  - Density: 9.9959/km^{2} (25.889/sq mi)
  - Urban: 16,338

Demographics
  - Literacy: 71.34%
  - Sex ratio: 810 ♀/ 1000 ♂

Languages
  - Official: Bhoti; Purgi; Urdu; Hindi; English
  - Regional: Purgi, Shina, Zangskari, Balti
- Time zone: UTC+05:30 (IST)
- Vehicle registration: JK 07(till 2019) LA-01
- Website: kargil.nic.in

Kargil district is a district in Indian-administered Ladakh in the disputed Kashmir-region, which is administered as a union territory of Ladakh. It is named after the city of Kargil, where the district headquarters lies. The district is bounded by the Indian-administered union territory of Jammu and Kashmir to the west, the Pakistani-administered administrative territory of Gilgit–Baltistan to the north, Leh district of Ladakh to the east, and the Indian state of Himachal Pradesh to the south. Encompassing the historical region known as Purig, the district lies to the northeast of the Great Himalayas and encompasses part of the Zanskar Range. Its population inhabits the river valleys of Suru, Wakha Rong (not to be confused with the Rong Valley in Leh district), and Sod Valley.

Kargil district was originally created in 1979, when Ladakh was part of the state of Jammu and Kashmir. In 2003, Kargil was granted a Ladakh Autonomous Hill Development Council (LAHDC). In 2019, Ladakh became a union territory, with Kargil and Leh being its joint capitals. In 2024, the Drass and Zanskar districts were announced to be separated from Kargil district.

Shia Muslims comprise the majority of the population of the district.

== Geography ==
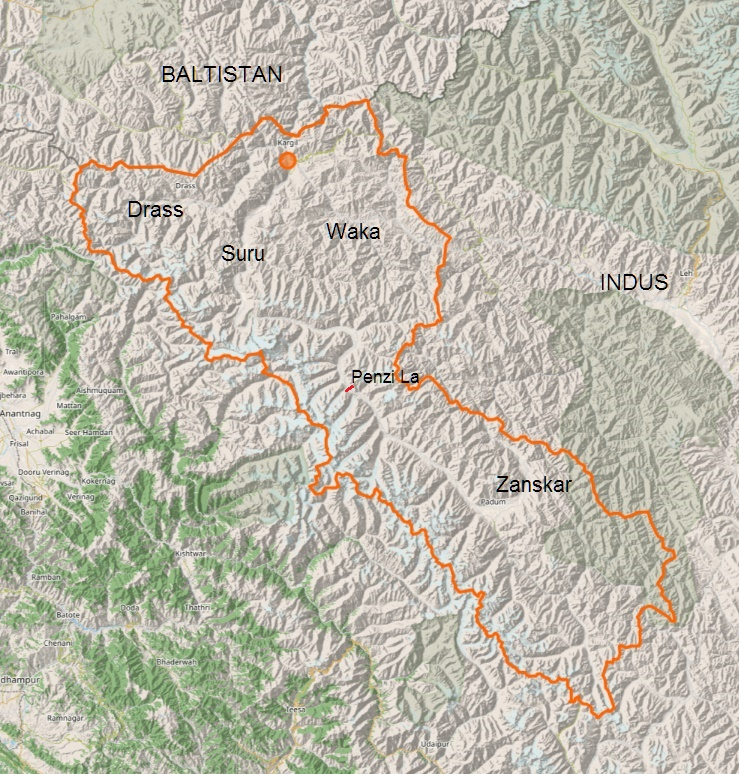
Kargil district river valleys

The pre-2024 Kargil district lies between the crest of the Great Himalaya Range and the Indus River of Ladakh. It consists of two river valleys: the Suru River and its tributaries in the north, and the Zanskar River and its tributaries in the south. The Pensi La pass separates the two. The Suru flows north into Baltistan and joins the Indus River near Marol. The Zanskar River flows east and debouches into the Indus River in Leh district near a location called "Sangam".

The Suru River has two significant tributaries: Wakha Rong, (Note: Alternatively, Wakha Chu, Wakka Chu or Wakkha Chu) which flows northwest from Namika La to join the Suru River near Kargil, and the Dras River, which originates near the Zoji La pass and joins the Suru River a short distance north of Kargil. (Note: Technically, the Suru River is considered a tributary of the Dras River since the latter comes with a greater volume. But the combined river flows north essentially through the channel of the Suru River.) Wakha Rong, also called the "Purik River", contains the main travel route between Kargil and Leh, and lent its name to the Kargil region itself as "Purig". The Dras River valley has historically been a subdivision called Drass.

Zanskar was a traditionally Buddhist kingdom formed in the 10th century, which became subject to the Ladakhi kings.

Per the 2011 census, the Kargil tehsil, which includes the Drass and Wakha Rong valleys, contains 61% of the population of the district. The Sankoo tehsil, representing the upper Suru valley, contains 10% of the population and the Zanskar tehsil contains 29% of the population.

=== Vulnerability to natural disasters ===
The Kargil district is particularly vulnerable to landslides, cloudbursts, and flash floods. The main highways connecting Kargil with adjacent regions (NH-1D and NH-301) are prone to landslides. Recurring flash floods were observed in the surroundings of the Kargil town in 2006, 2010, 2013, 2014, 2016 and 2018. These flash floods caused massive damages to roads, buildings, and agricultural area.

== History ==
=== Buddhist dynasties ===
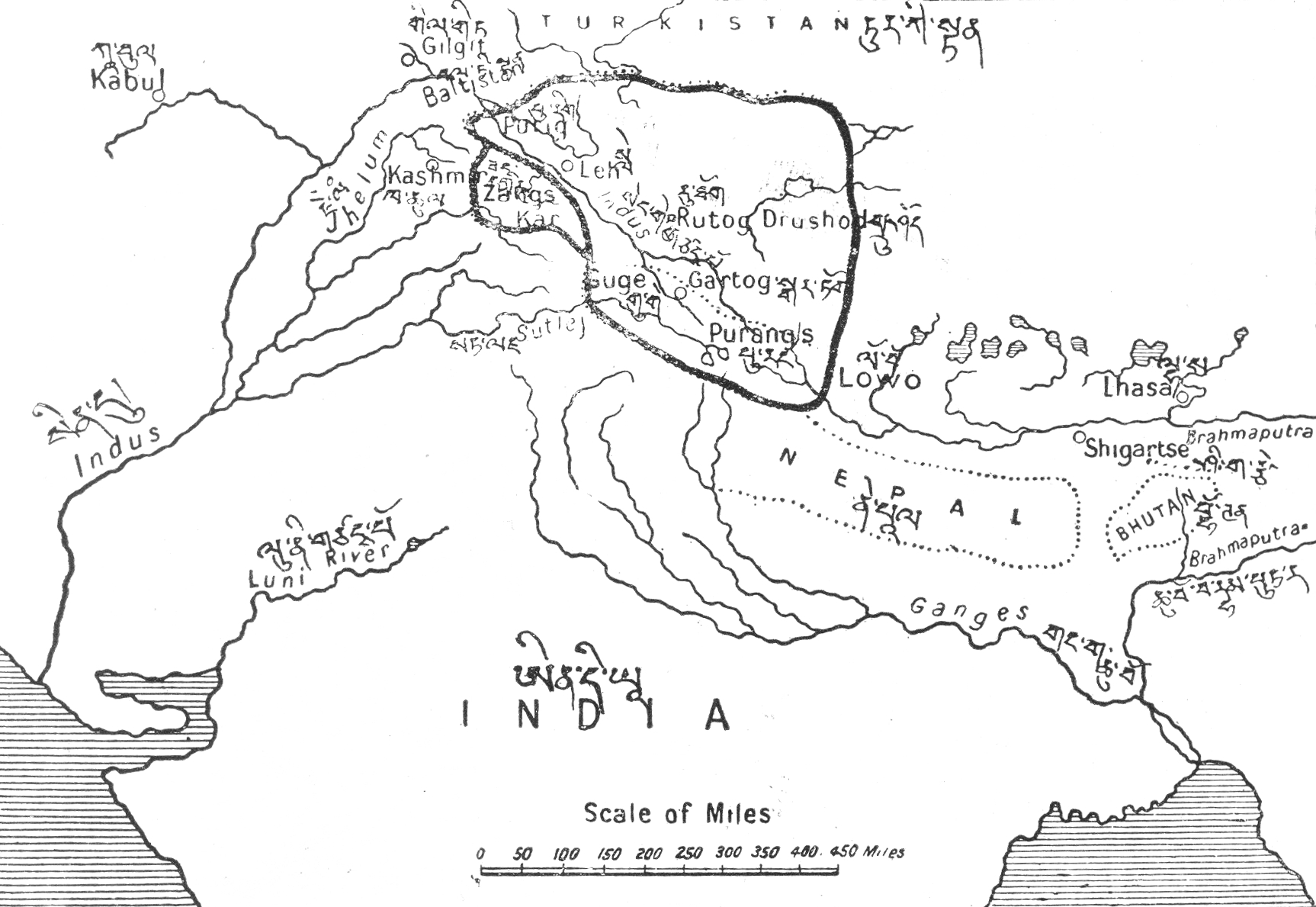
The Empire of King Nyimagon in Western Tibet about 975-1000 AD. The eldest son Palgyimon received the bulk of the empire under the name Maryul, based in Leh.

Purig is believed to have been conquered, along with Ladakh proper (modern Leh district), by Lhachen Palgyigon, the son of the West Tibetan King Kyide Nyimagon, in c. 900 AD. After his father's death, Palgyigon controlled the vast territory called Maryul, which stretched from the Zoji La pass to the basin of the Sengge Zangbo river (upper Indus river in Tibet). The third son, Detsukgon, inherited Zanskar along with Lahul and Spiti. From this time onwards, Purig was attached to Ladakh. Zanskar had an independent existencence even though it was occasionally conquered and made a tributary to Ladakh.

The Suru Valley was historically ruled from Kartse (34.2672°N 76.0018°E), a fort in a branch valley near Sankoo. An inscription names its ruler as Tri-gyal (Wylie: k'ri rgyal). Tibetologist A. H. Francke believes that the dynasty of Tri-gyals might have been in existence prior to the formation of the Maryul kingdom. However, there is no mention of it in Ladakh Chronicles. (Note: This might imply that Wakha Rong and Dras valleys (on the route between Zoji La and upper Ladakh) were under Ladakhi control, but Suru, being a side valley of the main route, might have remained independent, outside the domain of "Purig" until modern period.)

The principality of Kartse apparently controlled the entire western Ladakh, from Mulbekh and Wanla in the east to Dras in the west, even though the extent of territory would have varied with time. The Tri-gyals were Buddhist and adopted the religion from Kashmir in ancient times. They commissioned a giant Maitreya rock carving in the vicinity of Kartse, and others at Mulbekh and possibly Apati.

=== Medieval period ===
Islam arrived in the Kashmir Valley around 1320 as a new force to be reckoned with. During the rule of Sultan Sikandar (r. 1394–1416), his general Rai Madari crossed the Zoji La pass and conquered Purig and Baltistan. This paved the way for the conversion of the two regions to Islam. Sultan Zain-ul-Abidin ran an expedition to Tibet, conquering Ladakh along the way. The Tri-gyal of Kartse is said to have become his vassal and assisted in the invasions. The first dynasty of Ladakh did not last much longer after this. A second "Namgyal" dynasty was established around 1460 AD.

Some time after this, a Muslim chieftaincy connected to Skardu appeared in Purig, first at Sod northeast of Kargil, then with a branch at Chiktan northeast of Namika La. During the invasion of Ladakh by Mirza Haidar Dughlat in 1532, Sod and Chiktan appear to have submitted, but not Kartse. Joint raids were conducted on Kartse but they failed. The chief or commander of Suru, named "Baghan", is also said to have been killed during one of the raids. (Note: Baghan is described as "a Chui of the provinces of Tibet", which is taken to mean "headman" by Petech.)

Tashi Namgyal (r. 1555–1575) re-established the old borders by conquering Purig as well as west Tibet. His successors Tsewang Namgyal I and Jamyang Namgyal were equally energetic. However, Jamyang Namgal suffered a reverse, having been captured by the ruler of Skardu, Ali Mir, better known as Ali Sher Khan Anchan (r. 1590–1625). A marital alliance between the two was later established, accordingly Jamyang Namgyal married a Balti princess Gyal Khatun and got reinstated as the ruler, while his own daughter Mandok Gyalmo was married to Anchan. Jamyang and Gyal Khatun's son Sengge Namgyal again rejuvenated Ladakh to old glory and in fact went further by annexing the kingdom of Guge in west Tibet.

In 1586, Kashmir became a Mughal province. Purig and Baltistan were Islamic, and Mughal involvement in the affairs of the region became endemic. In 1638, emperor Shah Jahan sent a force to intervene in Baltistan and installed Ali Mir's son Adam Khan as the ruler. The joint forces of Mughal Kashmir and Adam Khan blocked Sengge Namgyal's efforts to regain Purig, forcing him to sue for peace. When Sengge Namgyal reneged on his tribute, the emperor imposed economic sanctions against Ladakh barring all trade, which impoverished Ladakh.

Under his son Deldan Namgyal (Bde-ldan-rnam-rgyal) between 1640 and 1675, Purig returned to the control of Ladakh. Zanskar and other parts of the modern Ladakh Division were also conquered.

=== Princely State of Jammu and Kashmir ===
In 1834, the Dogra ruler Gulab Singh of Jammu, acting under the suzerainty of the Sikh Empire, sent the governor of Kishtwar, general Zorawar Singh, to conquer the territory between Jammu and Tibet. Marching from Kishtwar, Zorawar Singh reached Purig and defeated the Bhotia leader Mangal at Sankoo in August 1834. Kartse, the then capital of Purig, fell into Zorawar Singh's hands. He built a fort there before advancing towards Leh. Tshed-Pal, the Gyalpo of Leh, was defeated and reinstalled as a subsidiary of the Dogras. Meanwhile, the chief of Sod rebelled and Zorawar Singh returned to reassert his authority. Zanskar subsequently offered submission.

The Purigis rebelled repeatedly, instigated by Sikh governor Mihan Singh of Kashmir. They also received support from Ahmed Shah of Baltistan. Zorawar Singh returned in 1839 to quell the rebellion and conquered Baltistan as well.

After the conquest, the region of the present Kargil district was organised into three ilaqas of the Kishtwar wazarat, (Note: The term "ilaqa" has the rather generic meaning of "area". It was the smallest unit of administration at that time, comparable to the present day community development blocks.) based at Kargil, Dras and Zanskar respectively. They were headed by civil officers called Thanadars. Later, Suru was made into a separate ilaqa.

Following the First Anglo-Sikh War and the Treaty of Amritsar (1846), Gulab Singh was made the Maharaja of the newly carved-out princely state of Jammu and Kashmir under British suzerainty. The princely state was organised into two large provinces, Jammu and Kashmir. Ladakh and Skardu were set up as districts in the Jammu province, called wazarats. The three Purig ilaqas were included in the Skardu wazarat. Zanskar continued to be attached to Kishtwar.

In 1901, a major reorganisation of the frontier districts took place. A new Ladakh wazarat was created, being one of the two wazarats of the Frontier Districts province. Kargil was made a new tehsil under the Ladakh wazarat, with the three Purig ilaqas (Drass, Kargil and Suru), the Zanskar ilaqa from the Kishtwar district, and the Kharmang ilaqa from the erstwhile Skardu district. Kargil, Leh and Skardu became the three tehsils of the Ladakh wazarat. Initially, the administration of the wazarat used to spend four months each at Leh, Kargil and Skardu. But shifting the entire staff so often proved onerous, and so the shifting was eventually limited to Leh and Skardu.

=== Post-1947 ===
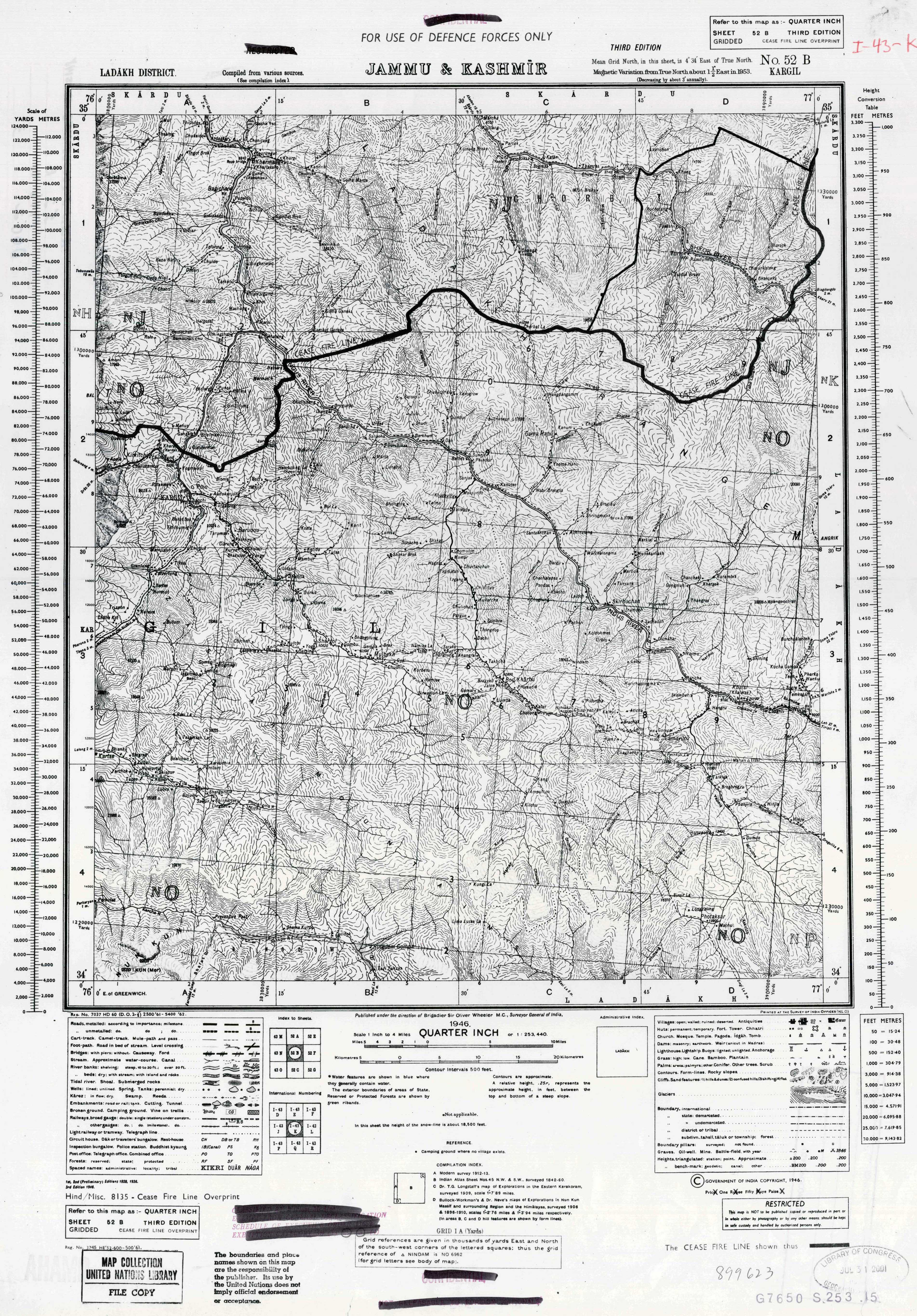
Survey of India map of the Kargil area with the 1949 line of control marked

During the Indo-Pakistani War of 1947, pitched battles were fought around Kargil, and the entire area including Drass and Zoji La Pass initially coming under the control of Gilgit Scouts. By November 1948, the Indian troops reclaimed all of Kargil and Leh tehsils and some portions of the Kharamang ilaqa bordering the Dras river. They remained with India after the ceasefire, forming the Ladakh district of the Jammu and Kashmir state of India.

During the Indo-Pakistani War of 1971 the entire Kargil region including key posts was captured by Indian troops under leadership of Col. Chewang Rinchen. To straighten the line of control in the area, the Indian Army launched night attacks when the ground temperatures sank to below −17 °C and about 15 enemy posts located at height of 16,000 feet and more were captured. After Pakistan forces lost the war and agreed to the Shimla Agreement, the strategic areas near Kargil remained with India.

In 1979, Ladakh was divided into Kargil and Leh districts within the Jammu and Kashmir state.

=== Kargil War ===
In the spring of 1999, under a covert plan of then Pakistan Army chief Pervez Musharraf, armed infiltrators from Baltistan, aided by the Pakistani Army, occupied vacant high-altitude posts in the Kargil and Drass regions. The result was a limited-scale conflict (Kargil War) between the two nuclear-equipped nations, which ended with India regaining the Kargil region through military action and diplomatic pressure. However, there remains the controversy of the mountain peak, knows as Point 5353 or the Marpo La Peak, which is still believed to be under Pakistan's control.

=== Ladakh union territory ===
In August 2019 the Parliament of India passed an act that separated Ladakh from Jammu and Kashmir into an independent union territory of India. Kargl and Leh continue to be the two districts of Ladakh, with the Kargil town designated as a joint capital of the union territory.

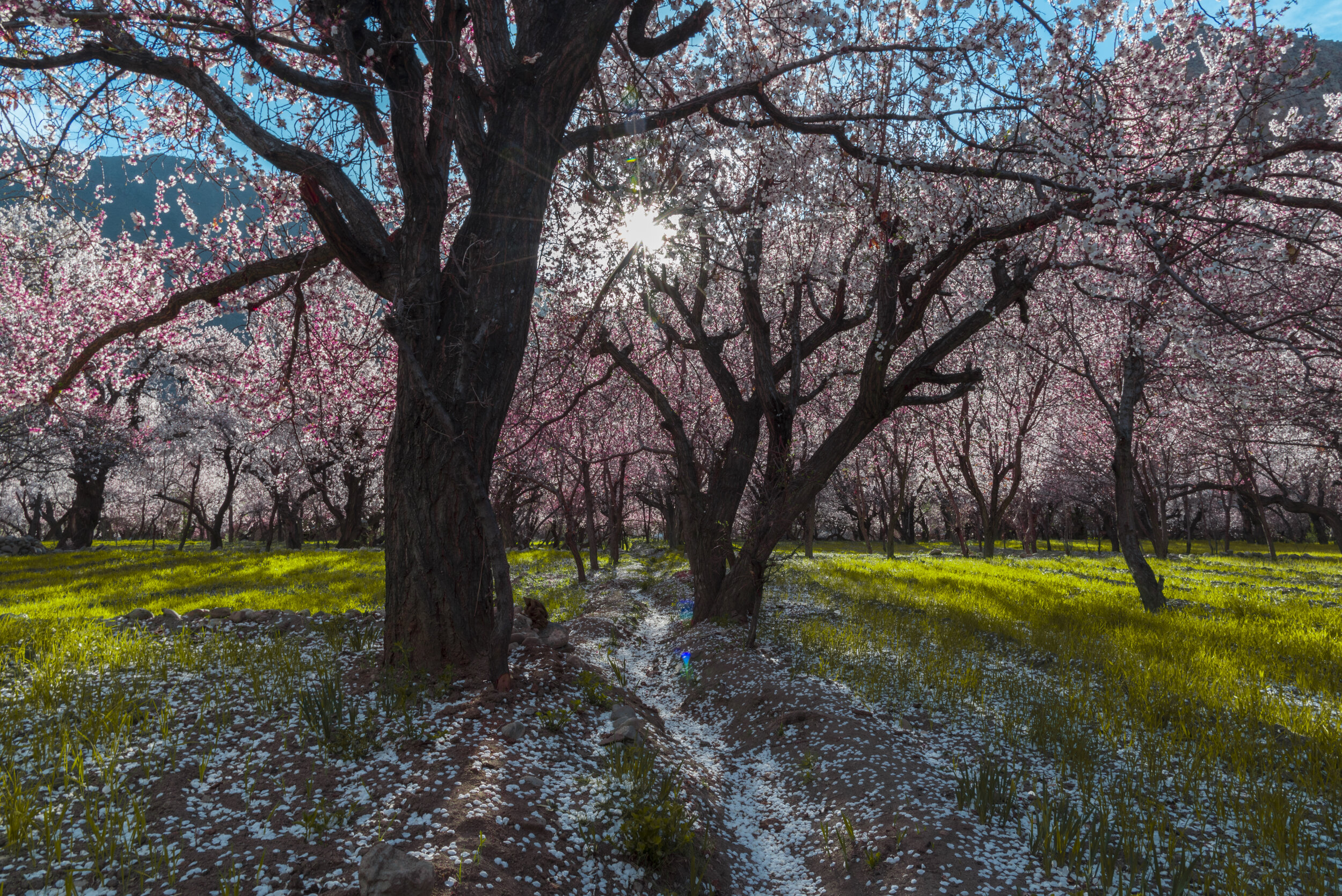
Apricot blossom during Spring season in Kargil, Ladakh.

== Climate ==
Kargil district is situated in the deep south-western part of the Himalayas, giving it a cool, temperate climate. Summers are warm with cool nights, while winters are long and cold with temperatures often dropping to −15 °C (5 °F) with recorded temperatures of −60 °C (−76 °F) in the tiny town of Dras, situated 56 km (35 mi) from Kargil town. The Zanskar Valley is colder. Kargil district is spread over 14,086 km^{2} (5,439 sq mi). The Suru River flows through the district.

The climate is cold and temperate. The average annual temperature in Kargil is 8.6 °C. About 318 mm of precipitation falls annually. The driest month is November with 6 mm. Most precipitation falls in March, with an average of 82 mm. The warmest month of the year is July with an average temperature of 23.3 °C. In January, the average temperature is −8.8 °C. It is the lowest average temperature of the whole year. The difference in precipitation between the driest month and the wettest month is 76 mm. The average temperatures vary during the year by 32.1 °C.

Fog and clouds during Spring in Kargil, Ladakh.

Climate data for Kargil, India
Month	Jan	Feb	Mar	Apr	May	Jun	Jul	Aug	Sep	Oct	Nov	Dec	Year
Mean daily maximum °C (°F)	−4.3 (24.3)	−2.6 (27.3)	1.3 (34.3)	10.5 (50.9)	18.9 (66.0)	24.7 (76.5)	26.2 (79.2)	25.6 (78.1)	22.2 (72.0)	15.8 (60.4)	7.8 (46.0)	−3.9 (25.0)	11.9 (53.3)
Mean daily minimum °C (°F)	−13.2 (8.2)	−12.9 (8.8)	−7.9 (17.8)	1.3 (34.3)	7 (45)	11.3 (52.3)	12.4 (54.3)	12 (54)	10 (50)	0.7 (33.3)	−8.6 (16.5)	−12.1 (10.2)	0.0 (32.1)
Average precipitation mm (inches)	46 (1.8)	51 (2.0)	82 (3.2)	35 (1.4)	26 (1.0)	11 (0.4)	7 (0.3)	10 (0.4)	10 (0.4)	8 (0.3)	6 (0.2)	26 (1.0)	318 (12.4)
Source: Climate-Data.org

== Administration ==
The Kargil district was formed in July 1979, by separating it from Leh. Kargil has 5 Sub-Divisions, 8 tehsils, and 14 Blocks.

Sub-Divisions (5): Drass, Kargil, Shakar-Chiktan, Sankoo, Zanskar (Padum)

Tehsils (8): Drass, Kargil, Shakar-Chiktan, Shargole, Sankoo, Trespone (Trespone), Taisuru, Zanskar (Padum)

Blocks (14): Drass, Kargil, Shakar, Chiktan, Shargole, Sankoo, Trespone, Saliskote, Gund Mangalpore, Taisuru, Padum, Lungnaq, Cha, Zangla

Each block consists of a number of panchayats.

=== Politics ===
It forms part of the Ladakh parliamentary constituency. Major political parties in the region include National Conference, Congress, PDP, BJP, LUTF (now merged with the BJP) and the erstwhile Kargil Alliance. The present Member of Parliament (MP) for Ladakh is Mohmad Haneefa.

Ladakh, a union territory without a legislature, does not have a legislative assembly but is represented in the Parliament.

Sh. Rakesh Kumar (IAS) is the current District Development Commissioner for Kargil.

=== Autonomous Hill Council ===
Kargil District is administered by an elected body known as the Ladakh Autonomous Hill Development Council, Kargil. The LAHDC-K was established in 2003.

== Demographics ==
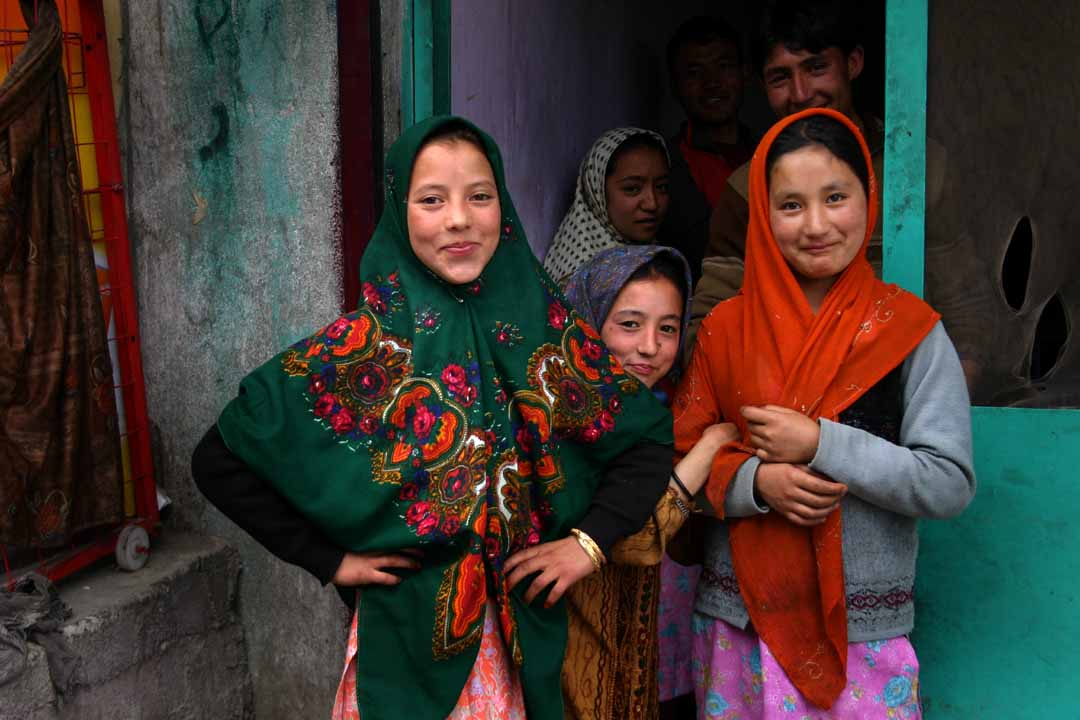
Local girls in Kargil

According to the 2011 census Kargil district has a population of 140,802. This gives it a ranking of 603rd in India (out of a total of 640). The district has a population density of 10 inhabitants per square kilometre (26/sq mi). Its population growth rate over the decade 2001-2011 was 20.18%. Kargil has a sex ratio of 810 females per every 1000 males, and a literacy rate of 71.34%.

Sex Ratio in Kargil District in 2011 Census. (no. females per 1,000 males)
Religion (and population)	Sex Ratio
Muslim (pop 108,239)	941
Buddhist (pop 20,126)	975
Hindu (pop 10,341)	936
Other (pop 2,096)	133
Total (pop 140,802)	810

=== Religion ===
Religion in Kargil district (2011)
Religion	Percent(%)
Islam	76.87%
Buddhism	14.29%
Hinduism	7.34%
Sikhism	0.83%
Other or not stated	0.67%

Block	Muslim	Buddhist	Other
Kargil	79.32	7.87	12.81
Sanku	95.98	0.95	3.07
Zanskar	5.53	93.81	0.66

Of the total population, 77% are Muslims, of which 63% follow Shia Islam. Most of the district's Muslims are found in the north (Kargil town, Drass, and the lower Suru valley). Of the remainder, 17% of the total population practises Tibetan Buddhism and Bön, mostly found in Zanskar with small populations in the upper Suru valley (Rangdum) and around Shergol, Mulbekh and Garkhone. The remaining 8% of the population follows Hinduism and Sikhism, though as many as 95% of them are male.

Much of Kargil population is inhabited by the Purigpa and Balti people of Tibetan origin. They converted from Buddhism to Islam in the 14th century and intermingled with other Aryan people. Muslims mainly inhabit the valley of Drass and speak Shina, a small number community, known as Brokpa, inhabit the Dha-Hanu region and Garkone village along the Indus River. Some Arghons and Shina have also settled in Kargil town.

Kargil district: religion, gender ratio, and % urban of population, according to the 2011 Census
	Hindu	Muslim	Christian	Sikh	Buddhist	Jain	Other	Not stated	Total
Total	10,341	108,239	604	1,171	20,126	28	4	289	140,802
Total	7.34%	76.87%	0.43%	0.83%	14.29%	0.02%	0.00%	0.21%	100.00%
Male	9,985	55,762	532	1,101	10,188	16	3	198	77,785
Female	356	52,477	72	70	9,938	12	1	91	63,017
Gender ratio (% female)	3.4%	48.5%	11.9%	6.0%	49.4%	42.9%	25.0%	31.5%	44.8%
Sex ratio (no. of females per 1,000 males)	936	941	135	964	975	750	333	460	810
Urban	3,139	12,671	63	360	88	2	1	14	16,338
Rural	7,202	95,568	541	811	20,038	26	3	275	124,464
% Urban	30.4%	11.7%	10.4%	30.7%	0.4%	7.1%	25.0%	4.8%	11.6%

=== Languages ===
Languages of Kargil district (2011)
1. Purgi (65.3%)
2. Shina (9.83%)
3. Ladakhi (7.02%)
4. Urdu (5.32%)
5. Balti (3.23%)
6. Tibetan (1.26%)
7. Punjabi (1.00%)
8. Others (6.99%)

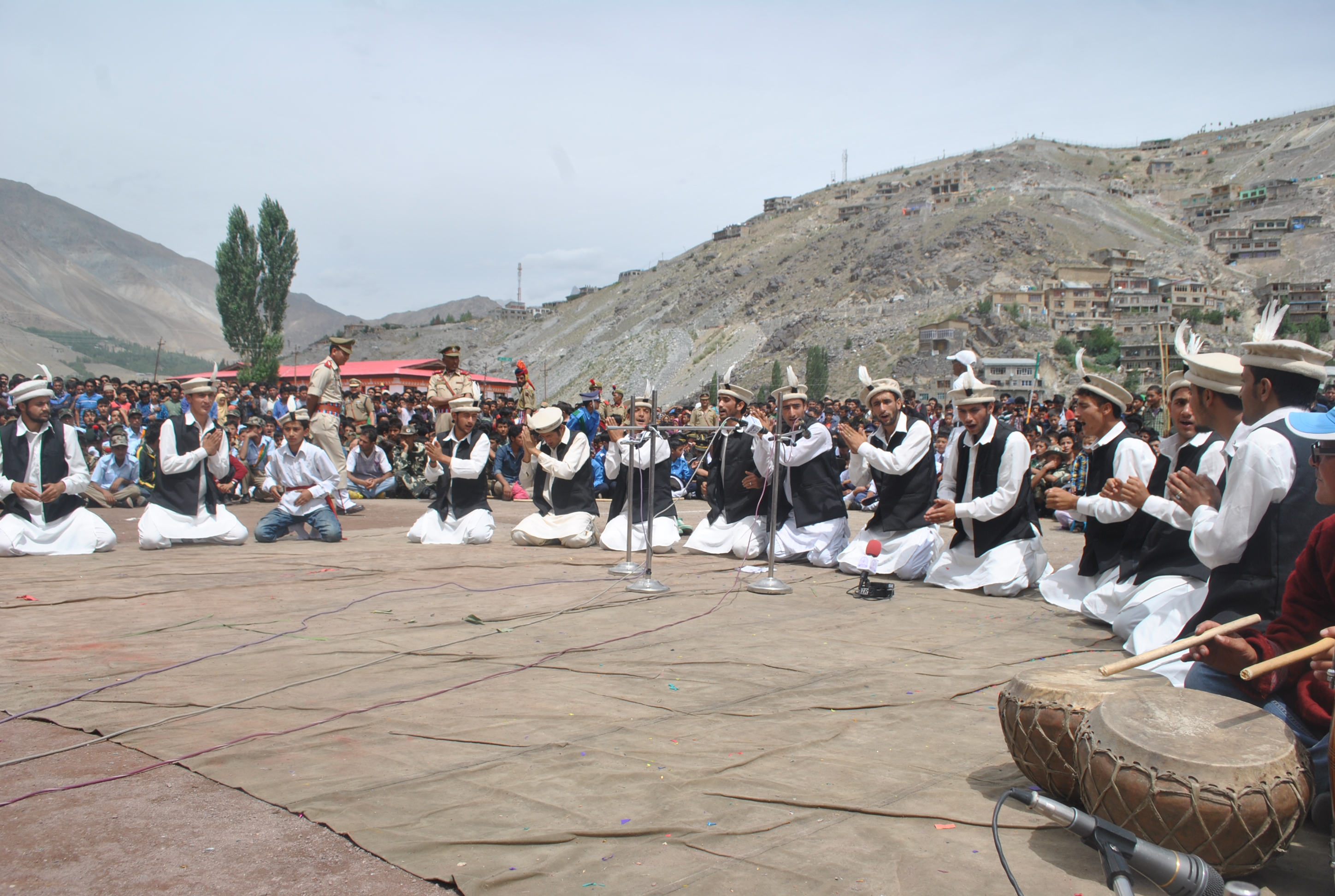
Shina cultural performance in Kargil

The Purgi dialect of Balti is spoken by 65% while 10 per cent speak Shina language in regions like Drass and Batalikis. Urdu is also spoke and understood in Kargil.

Balti language has four variants/dialects and Purgi is the southern dialect of Balti language. Balti, is a branch of Archaic Western Tibetan language, is also spoken by the inhabitants of the four districts of (Baltistan) in Pakistan and Turtuk in the Nubra valley of the Leh district as well. The Buddhists of Zanskar speak Zanskari language of the Ladakhi-Balti language group.

== Culture ==
Though earlier Tibetan contact has left a profound influence upon the people of both Kargil and Leh, after the spread of Shia Islam the people of Kargil were heavily influenced by Persian culture. This is apparent by the use of Persian words and phrases as well as in songs called marsiyas and qasidas. At least until recently, some Kargilis, especially those of the Agha families (descendants of Syed preachers who were in a direct line descent from the Islamic prophet, Muhammad) went to Iraq for their education. Native Ladakhis go for higher Islamic studies in seminaries in Najaf, Iraq and Qom in Iran. These non-Agah scholars are popularly called as "Sheikh". Some among the most prominent religious scholars include Imam-e-Jummah, Sheikh Mussa Shariefi, Sheikh Ahmed Mohammadi, Sheikh Hussain Zakiri and Sheikh Anwar.

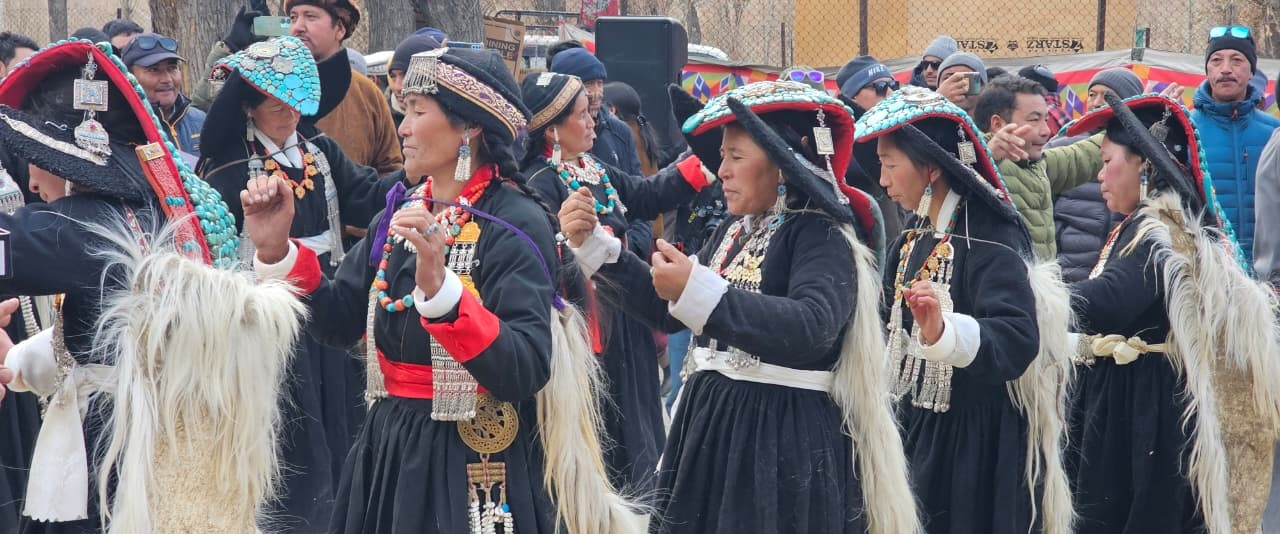
Cultural dance by local women of Kargil, Ladakh.

Social ceremonies such as marriages still carry many customs and rituals that are common to both the Muslims and Buddhists. Among the two districts of Ladakh, Kargil has a more mixed ethnic population and thus there are more regional dialects spoken in Kargil as compared to Leh. Local folk songs, which are called rgya-glu and balti ghazals, are still quite popular and are performed enthusiastically at social gatherings.

== Wildlife ==
=== Endangered species ===
Kargil is home to many endangered wildlife species:

- Snow leopard (Panthera uncia)
- Tibetan wolf (Canis lupus chanco)
- Himalayan brown bear (Ursus arctos isabellinus)
- Asiatic ibex (Capra ibex)
- Urial (Ovis vignei)
- Musk deer (Moschus spp.)
- Pikas
- Marmots
- Hares

Some of the reptiles found in Kargil district are:

- Platyceps ladacensis (Ladakh cliff racer)
- Phrynocephalus theobaldi (toad head agama)
- Altiphylax stoliczkai (Balti gecko)
- Paralaudakia himalayana (Himalayan agama)
- Ablepharus ladacensis (Ladakh ground skink)

Aishwarya Maheshwari of the World Wildlife Fund (WWF) is quoted as saying, "It is here in Kargil that one of world's most elusive creatures, the snow leopard, roams wild and free. During my research I have learnt about the tremendous decline in wildlife sightings since the 1999 Kargil war, so much so that even the common resident birds had disappeared."

=== Birds ===
Besides the endangered species, various birds are commonly seen in summer:

- Black-necked Eurasian magpie
- House sparrow
- Hoopoe
- Rosefinches
- Red-billed chough
- Eastern chiffchaff
- Common sandpiper
- European goldfinch

=== Gallery ===
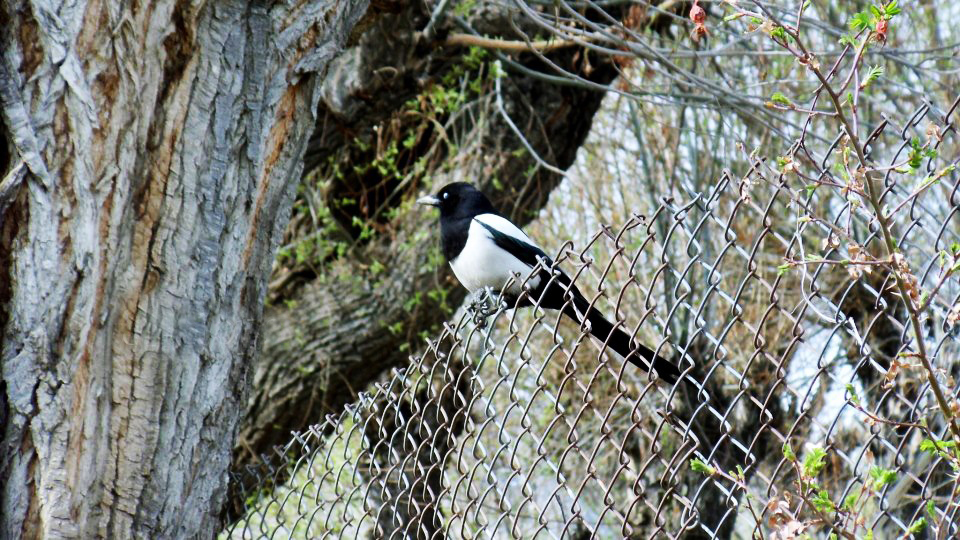
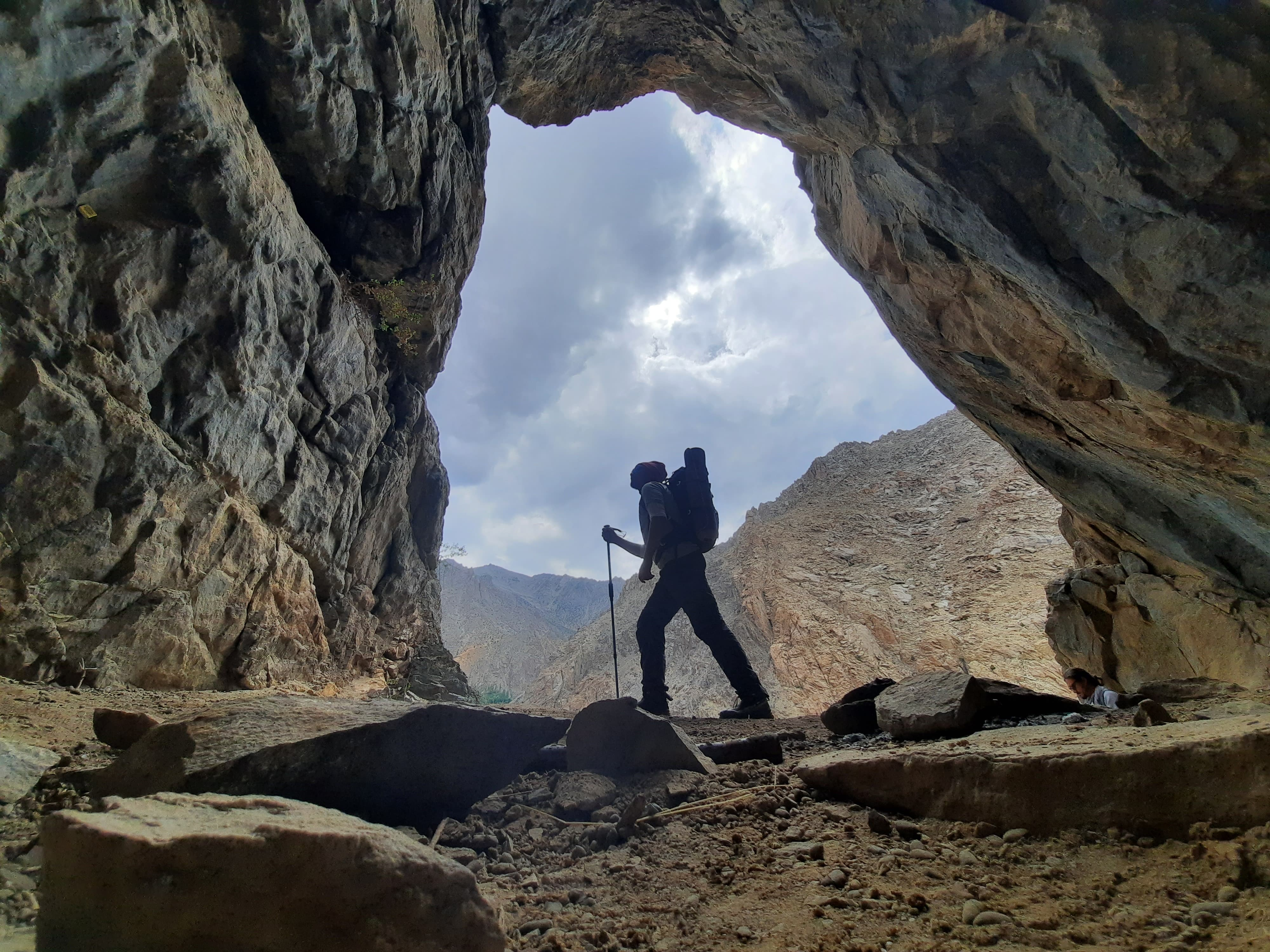
Rzongi Kor Cave located in Sharchey Village of Batalik Sector in Kargil
The Eurasian magpie, a common sight in Kargil

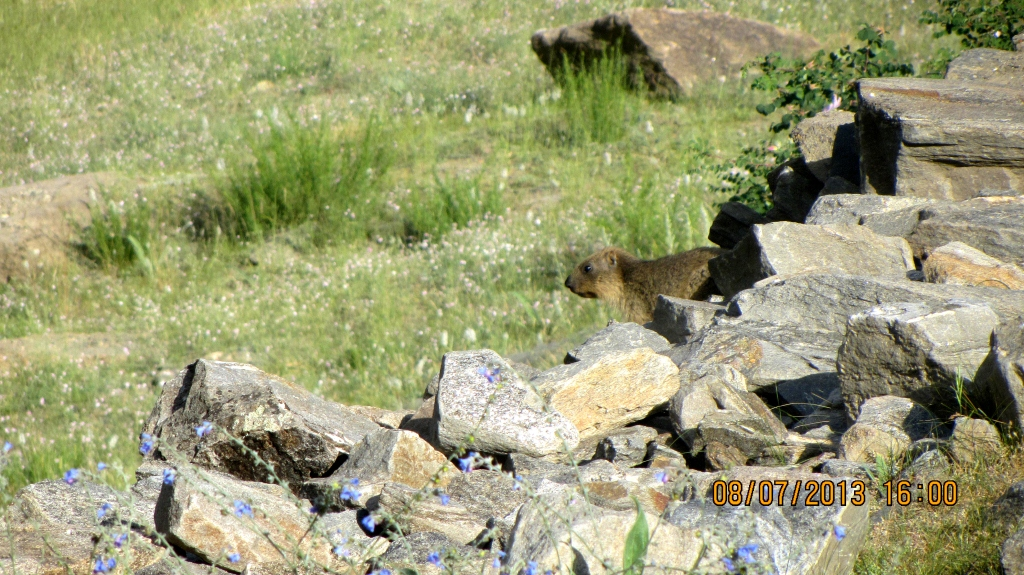
A marmot, found in the wild in Ladakh

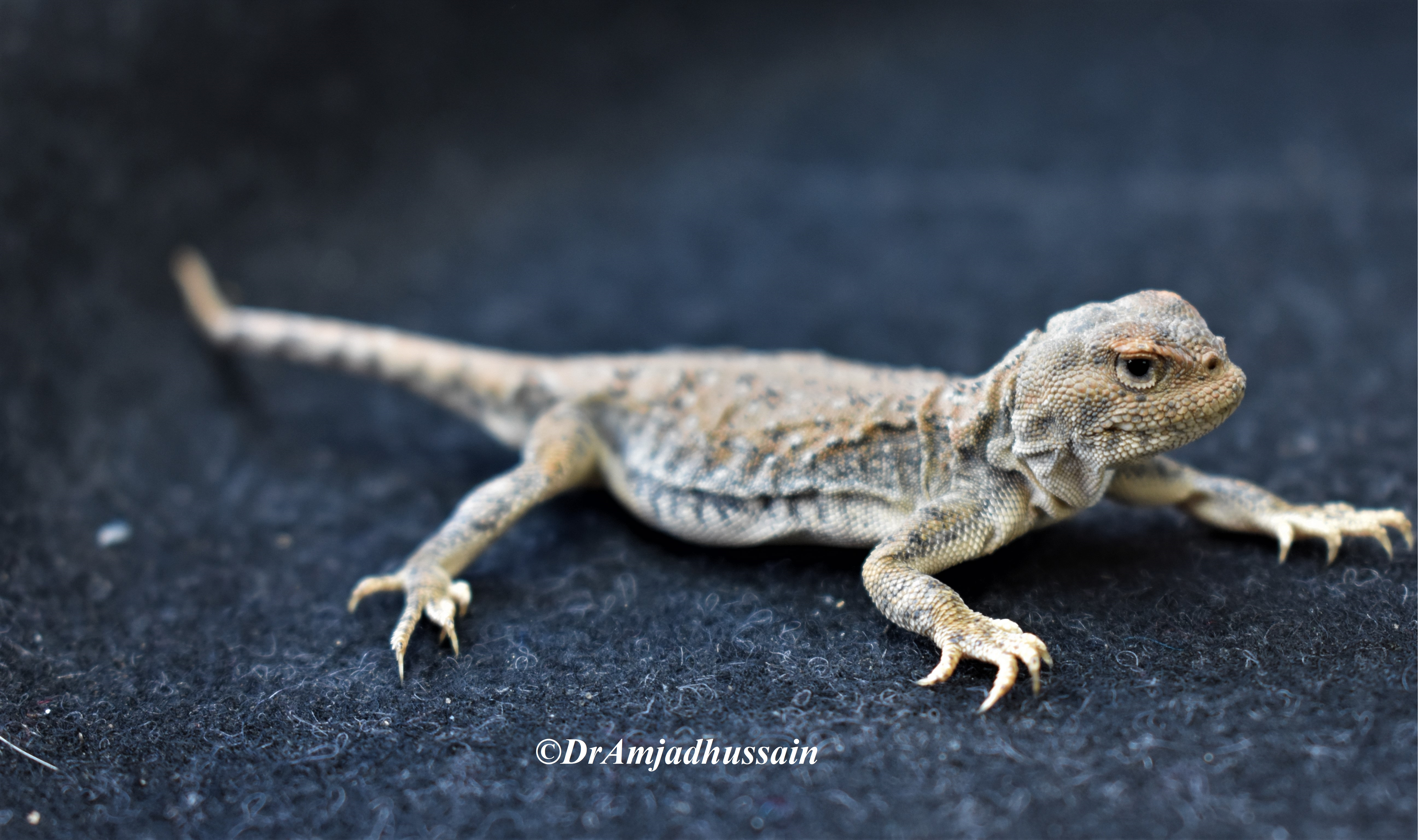
Ladakh toad head agama (Phrynocephalus theobaldi) at Kargil campus of the University of Ladakh

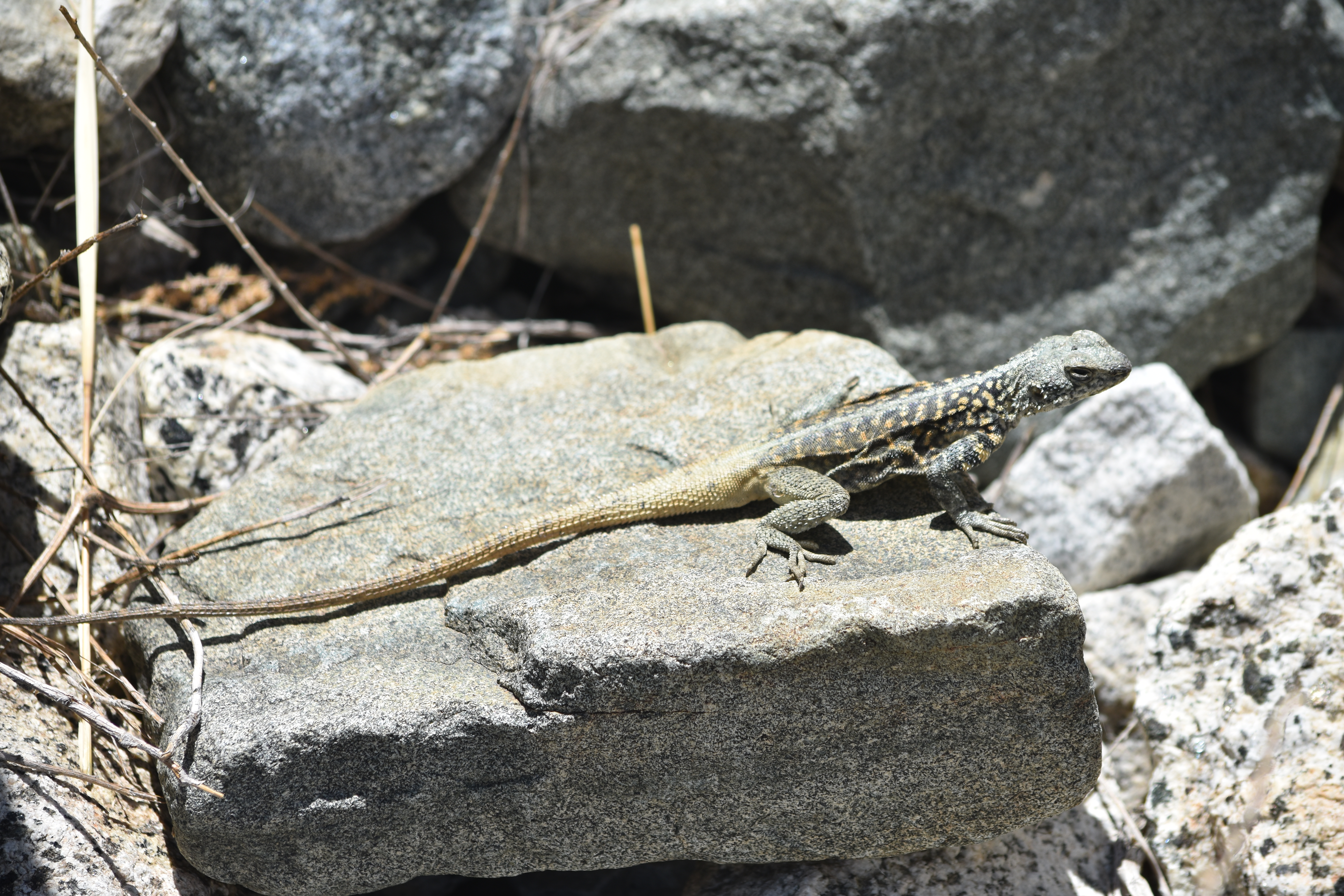
An adult Himalayan Agama (Paralaudakia himalayana) at Ringmospang, Kargil

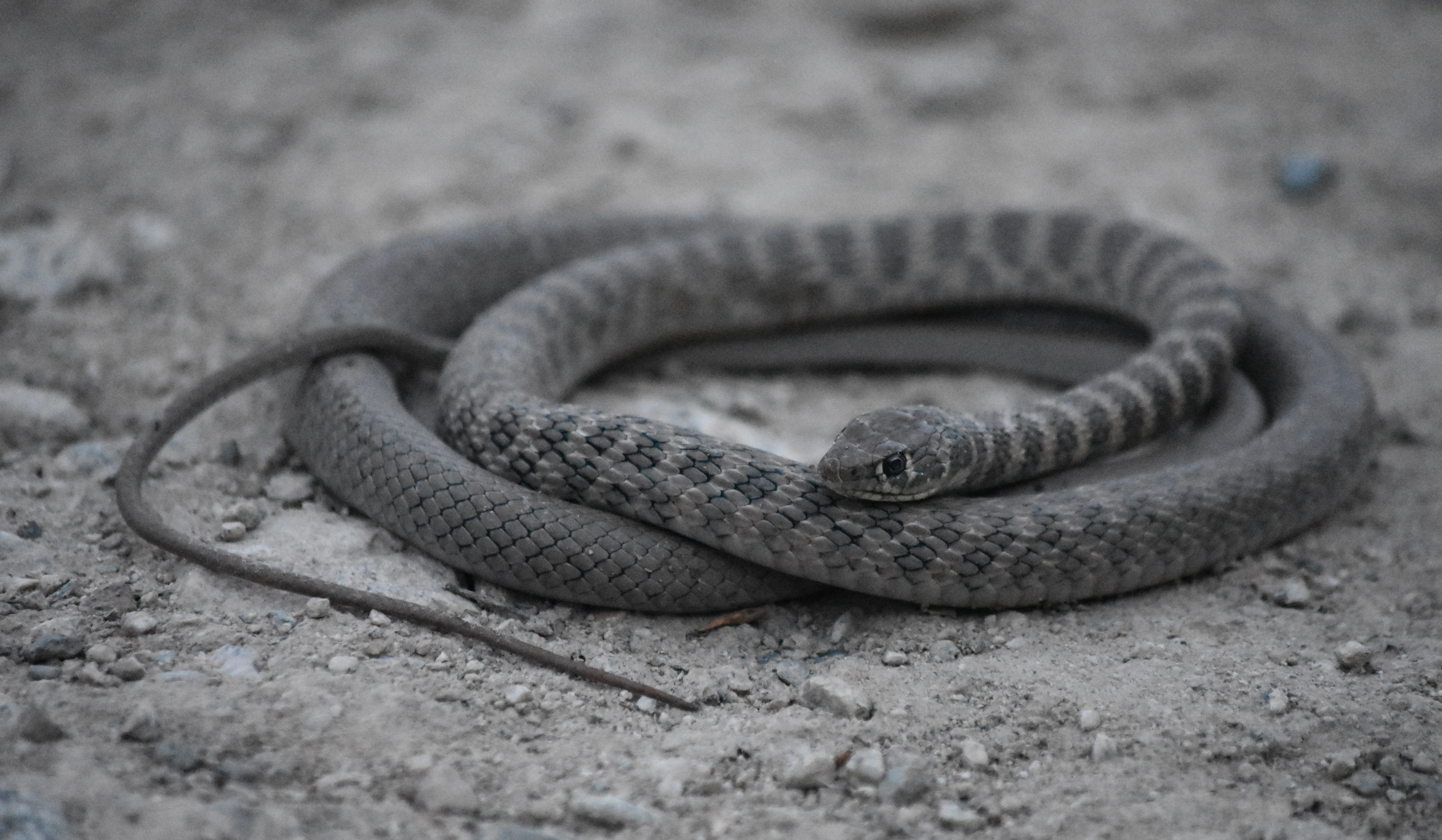
An adult Ladakh cliff racer (Platyceps ladacensis), from Gongma Minji, Kargil

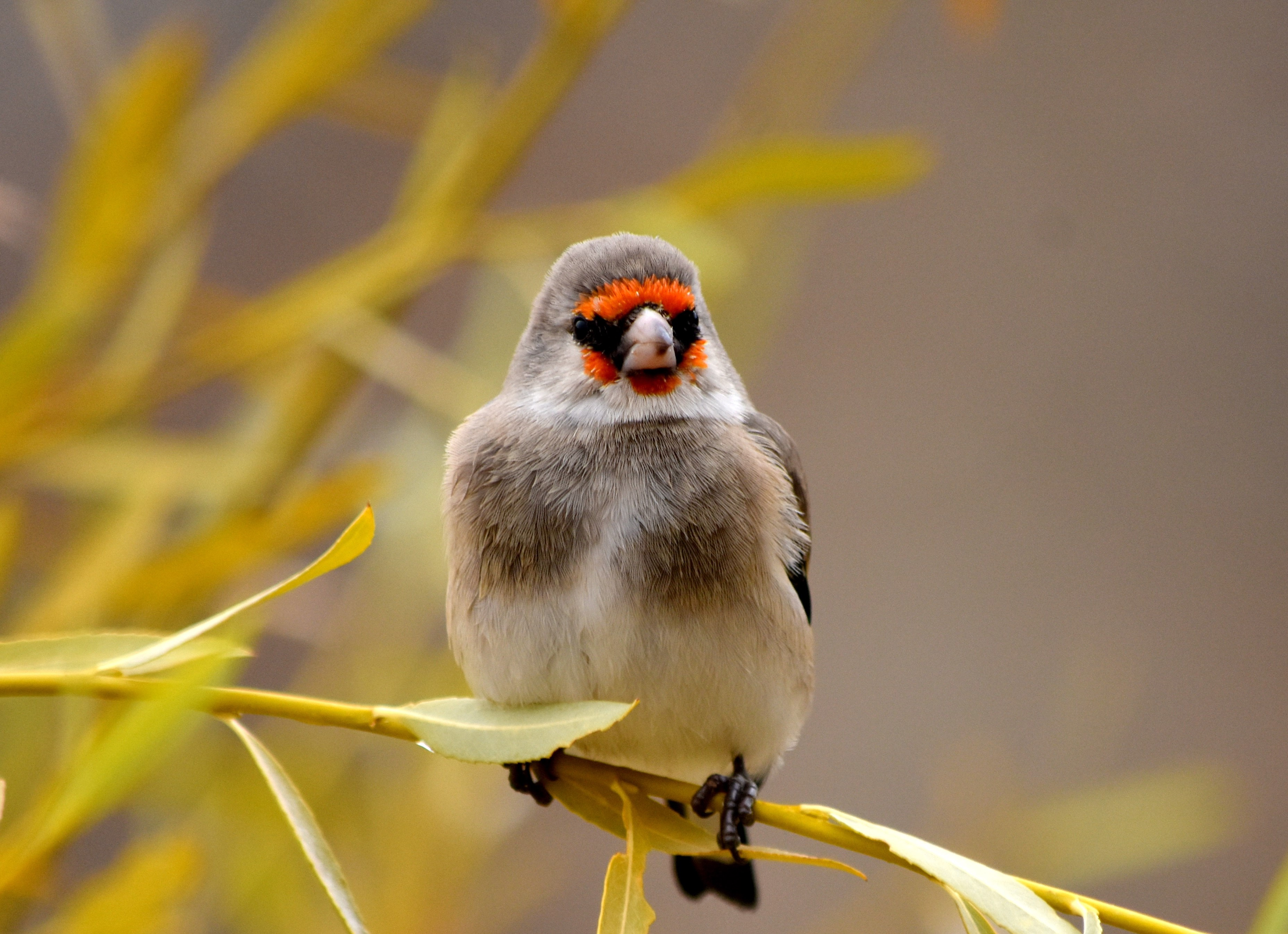
Grey-crowned goldfinch (Carduelis caniceps) at Ringmospang, Kargil

== Transportation ==
National Highway 1D, connecting Srinagar to Leh, passes through Kargil. This highway is typically open for traffic only from May to December due to heavy snowfall at the Zoji La. Kargil is 204 km (127 mi) from the capital city of Srinagar. There is a partially paved road leading from Kargil south to Zanskar, which is also only open only from June to September. The total distance to Zanskar is nearly 220 km (140 mi). India and Pakistan have both considered linking the Pakistani town of Skardu to Kargil with a bus route to reunite the Ladakh families separated by the line of control since 1972.

=== Road ===
Kargil is connected to the rest of India by high-altitude roads which are subject to landslides and are impassable in winter due to deep snows. The National Highway 1D connects Kargil to Srinagar. The NH 301 connects Kargil with the remote Zanskar region. Upgradation of this road is going on to reduce the time travel between Kargil and Padum, tehsil headquarters of Zanskar region.

The Nimmu–Padam–Darcha road is a major axis through Zanskar in Kargil district, connecting Lahaul in Himachal with Leh. The construction of this road was completed in March 2024.

=== Air ===
Kargil Airport is a non-operational airport used only for defence purposes by the Indian Air Force. Kargil Airport has been included under Central Govt.'s UDAN scheme for commercial operations. The nearest operational airport is Leh's Kushok Bakula Rimpochee Airport which is located 215 kilometres from Kargil.

=== Rail ===
There is no railway service currently in Ladakh, however, 2 railway routes are proposed- the Bhanupli–Leh line and Srinagar–Kargil–Leh line.

== See also ==
- List of districts of Ladakh
- List of villages in Kargil district
- Geography of Ladakh
- Tourism in Ladakh
- Ladakh Autonomous Hill Development Council, Kargil

== Bibliography ==
- District Census Handbook: Kargil (PDF), Directorate of Census Operations, Jammu and Kashmir, 2011, archived from the original (PDF) on 21 November 2017
- Aggarwal, Ravina (2004), Beyond Lines of Control: Performance and Politics on the Disputed Borders of Ladakh, India, Duke University Press, ISBN 0-8223-3414-3
- Cunningham, Alexander (1854), Ladak: Physical, Statistical, Historical, London: Wm. H. Allen and Co – via Internet Archive
- Devers, Quentin (2020), "Buddhism before the First Diffusion? The case of Tangol, Dras, Phikhar and Sani-Tarungtse in Purig and Zanskar (Ladakh)", Études Mongoles & Sibériennes, Centrasiatiques & Tibétaines, 51 (51), doi:10.4000/emscat.4226, S2CID 230579183
- Fisher, Margaret W.; Rose, Leo E.; Huttenback, Robert A. (1963), Himalayan Battleground: Sino-Indian Rivalry in Ladakh, Praeger – via archive.org
- Francke, Rev. A. H. (1907), A History of Western Tibet, S. W. Partridge & Co – via archive.org
- Gazetteer of Kashmir and Ladak, Calcutta: Superintendent of Government Printing, 1890 – via Internet Archive
- Grist, Nicola (2008). "Urbanisation in Kargil and its Effects in the Suru Valley". In Martijn van Beek; Fernanda Pirie (eds.). Modern Ladakh: Anthropological Perspectives on Continuity and Change. BRILL. ISBN 978-90-474-4334-6.
- Gupta, Radhika (2013). "Allegiance and Alienation: Border Dynamics in Kargil". In David N. Gellner (ed.). Borderland Lives in Northern South Asia. Duke University Press. pp. 47–71. ISBN 978-0-8223-7730-6.
- Howard, Neil (1997), "What happened between 1450 and 1550 AD? and other questions from the history of Ladakh", in Henry Osmaston; Nawang Tsering; International Association for Ladakh Studies (eds.), Recent Research on Ladakh 6: Proceedings of the Sixth International Colloquium on Ladakh, Leh 1993, Motilal Banarsidass Publ., pp. 121–138, ISBN 978-81-208-1432-5
- Huttenback, Robert A. (1961), "Gulab Singh and the Creation of the Dogra State of Jammu, Kashmir, and Ladakh" (PDF), The Journal of Asian Studies, 20 (4): 477–488, doi:10.2307/2049956, JSTOR 2049956, S2CID 162144034, archived from the original (PDF) on 23 November 2018
- Karim, Maj Gen Afsir (2013), Kashmir The Troubled Frontiers, Lancer Publishers LLC, pp. 30–, ISBN 978-1-935501-76-3
- Petech, Luciano (1977), The Kingdom of Ladakh, c. 950–1842 A.D., Instituto Italiano Per il Medio ed Estremo Oriente – via archive.org
- Panikkar, K. M. (1930), Gulab Singh, London: Martin Hopkinson Ltd
- Ghulam Mohiuddin Dar. Kargil: Its social, culture, and economic history.
- Kargil : The Important Trade Transit of Yesteryears, People & Society
- Shireen M. Mazari, The Kargil Conflict, 1999: Separating Fact from Fiction, The Institute of Strategic Studies, Islamabad (2003) ISBN 969-8772-00-6
