= Capi (newspaper) =

Tenyidie newspaper

- Front page for 11 September 2021
- Type: Daily newspaper
- Format: Print
- Owner: Mhalezolie Kire
- Founders: Vikesel Neikha; R. Solhou
- Publisher: Mhalezolie Kire
- Founded: 1988; 38 years ago
- Relaunched: 1997; 29 years ago
- Political alignment: Independent
- Language: Tenyidie
- City: Kohima
- Country: India
- Price: INR 6

Capi is a Tenyidie newspaper published from Kohima, the capital of Nagaland. It is the oldest existing vernacular daily in Nagaland and is widely circulated in Kohima, Chümoukedima, Dimapur and Phek.

== History ==
Capi was founded in 1988 by Vikesel Neikha (publisher) and R. Solhou (editor). The newspaper was issued weekly, biweekly and tri-weekly.

In 1997, the newspaper was relaunched as a daily newspaper. Capi shifted from manual print to offset printing in 2003.

On 16 November 2015, Capi published its front page in blank along with four other state newspapers—Eastern Mirror, The Morung Express, Nagaland Page and Tir Yimyim to protest against a diktat from the Assam Rifles. The Assam Rifles in a letter to the editors in October had ordered the editors to stop covering news related to the rebel group—National Socialist Council of Nagaland - Khaplang (NSCN-K).

== See also ==
- List of newspapers in Nagaland
