= Namsuru =

- Village
- Location in Ladakh, India Namsuru (India)
- Coordinates: 34.11°N 76.01°E
- Country: India
- Union Territory: Ladakh
- District: Sankoo
- Tehsil: Taisuru

Population (2011)
  - Total: 905

Languages
  - Official: Hindi, English
  - Spoken: Ladakhi, Urdu
- Time zone: UTC+5:30 (IST)
- PIN: 194403

Namsuru is a village in Sankoo district of the Indian union territory of Ladakh. The village is located 88 kilometres from Kargil.

== Demographics ==
According to the 2011 census of India, Hardas has 108 households. The literacy rate of Namsuru village is 48.70%. In Namsuru, Male literacy stands at 61.56% while the female literacy rate was 34.30%.

Demographics (2011 Census)
	Total	Male	Female
Population	905	460	445
Children aged below 6 years	176	75	101
Scheduled caste	0	0	0
Scheduled tribe	893	453	440
Literacy	48.70%	61.56%	34.20%
Workers (all)	239	188	51
Main workers (all)	74	–	–
Marginal workers (total)	165	120	45

== Transport ==
=== Road ===
Namsuru is connected to other places in Ladakh by the NH 301.

=== Rail ===
The nearest railway station to Namsuru is the Sopore railway station located at a distance of 305 kilometres.

=== Air ===
The nearest airport is at Kargil located at a distance of 94 kilometres but it is currently non-operational. The next nearest major airport is Leh Airport located at a distance of 301 kilometres.

== See also ==
- Ladakh
- Sankoo
- Suru Valley
- Rangdum
