= Trespone =

Trespone Lhunchhay
- Village
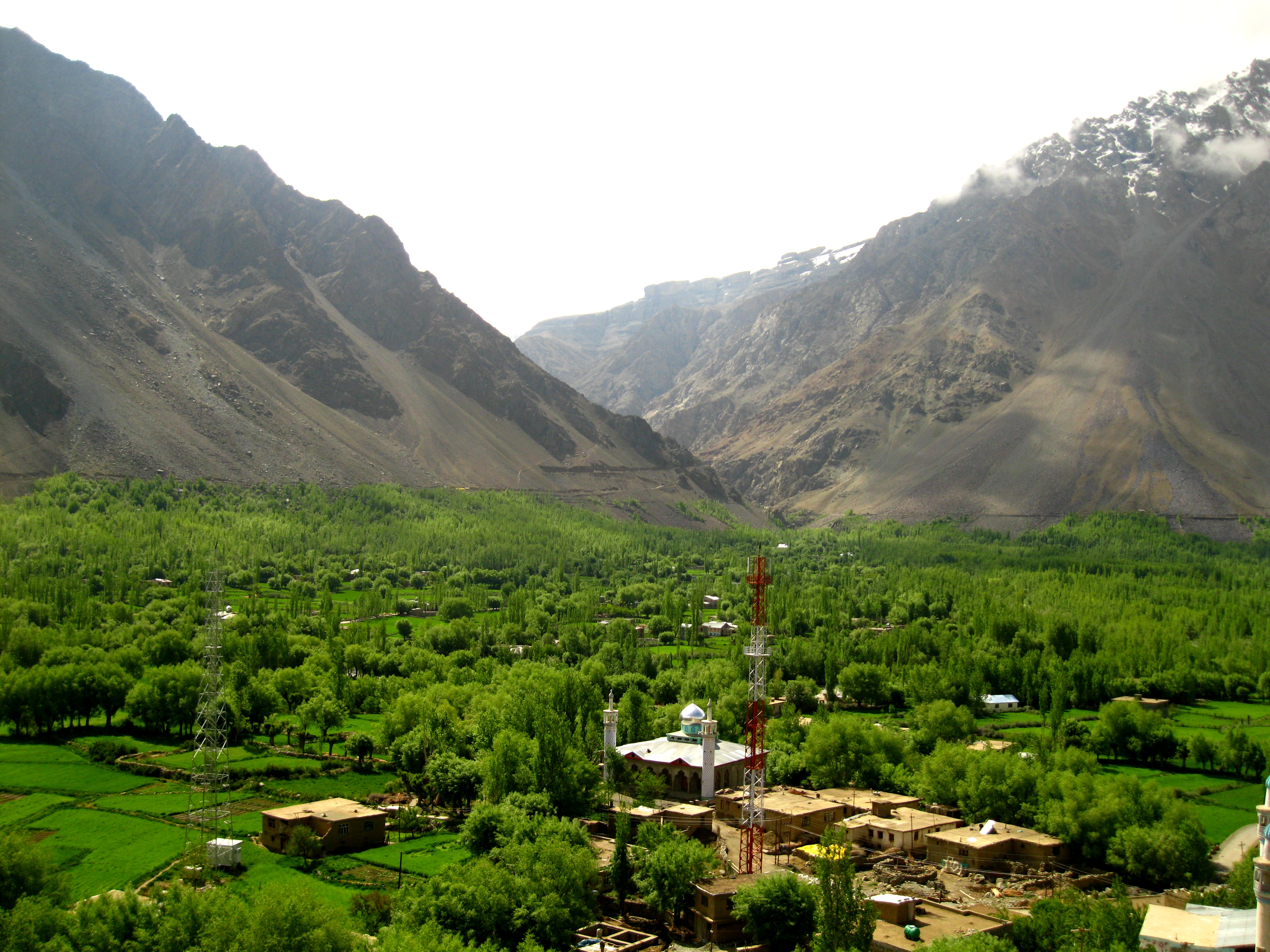
- village view from the Trespone Imambara
- Nickname: Trespone
- Location in Ladakh, India Trespone (India)
- Coordinates: 34.45°N 76.06°E
- Country: India
- Union Territory: Ladakh
- District: Sankoo
- Tehsil: TSG

Population (2011)
  - Total: 3,332

Languages
  - Official: Hindi, English
  - Spoken: Purgi, Urdu
- Time zone: UTC+5:30 (IST)
- PIN: 194105

Trespone is a scenic village in the TSG block of TSG tehsil in the Sankoo district of the Indian union territory of Ladakh. Trespone is a historically, culturally, and architecturally rich village in the Suru Valley, located on the bank of the Suru River, and is around 20 km from Kargil town. It is often called little Kashmir, and is the gateway to Suru Valley. It is surrounded by five other villages, namely Saliskote, G.M.Pore, Tambis, Kanoor and Sarchey.

== Landmark and historical place ==
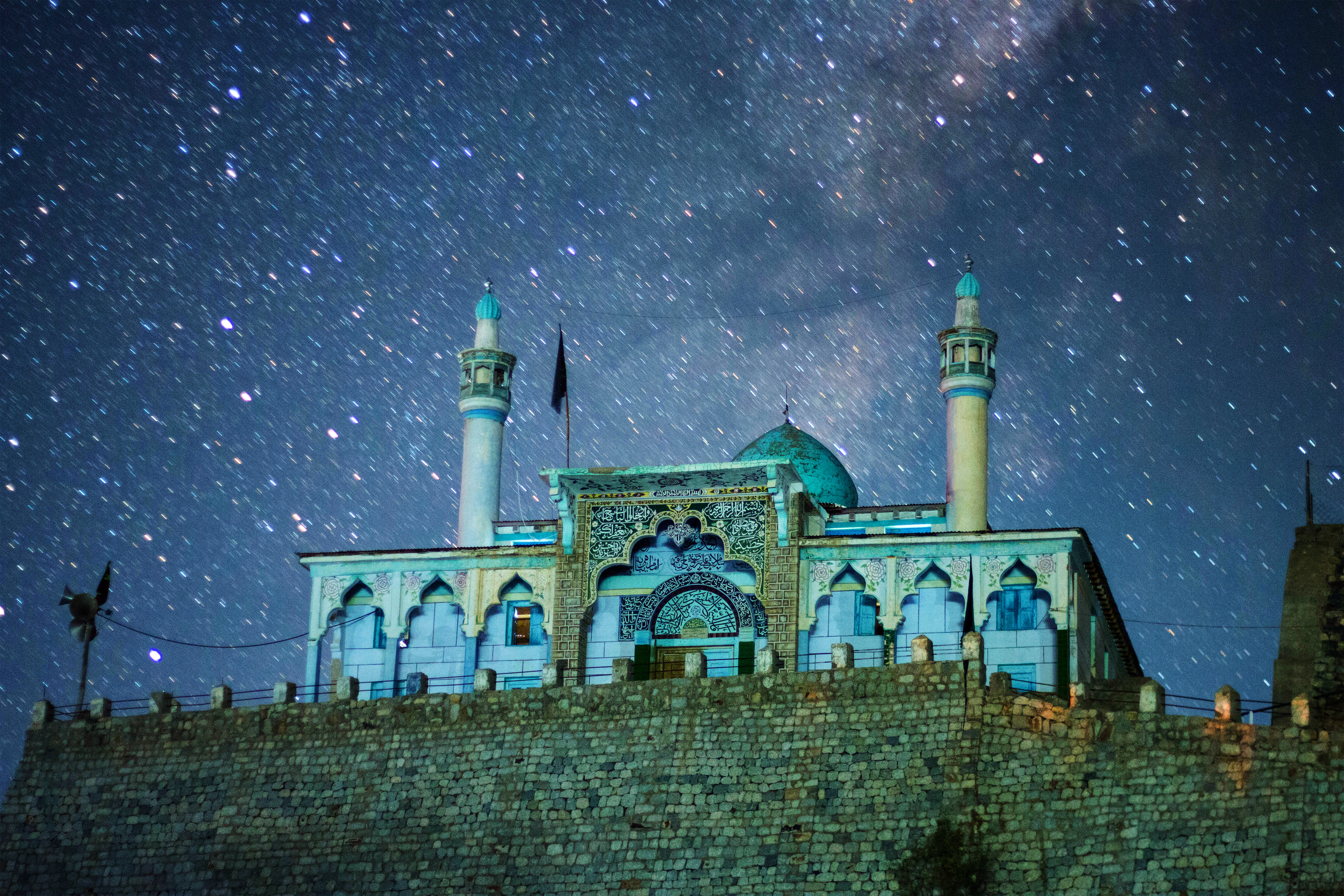
Imambara in Trespone

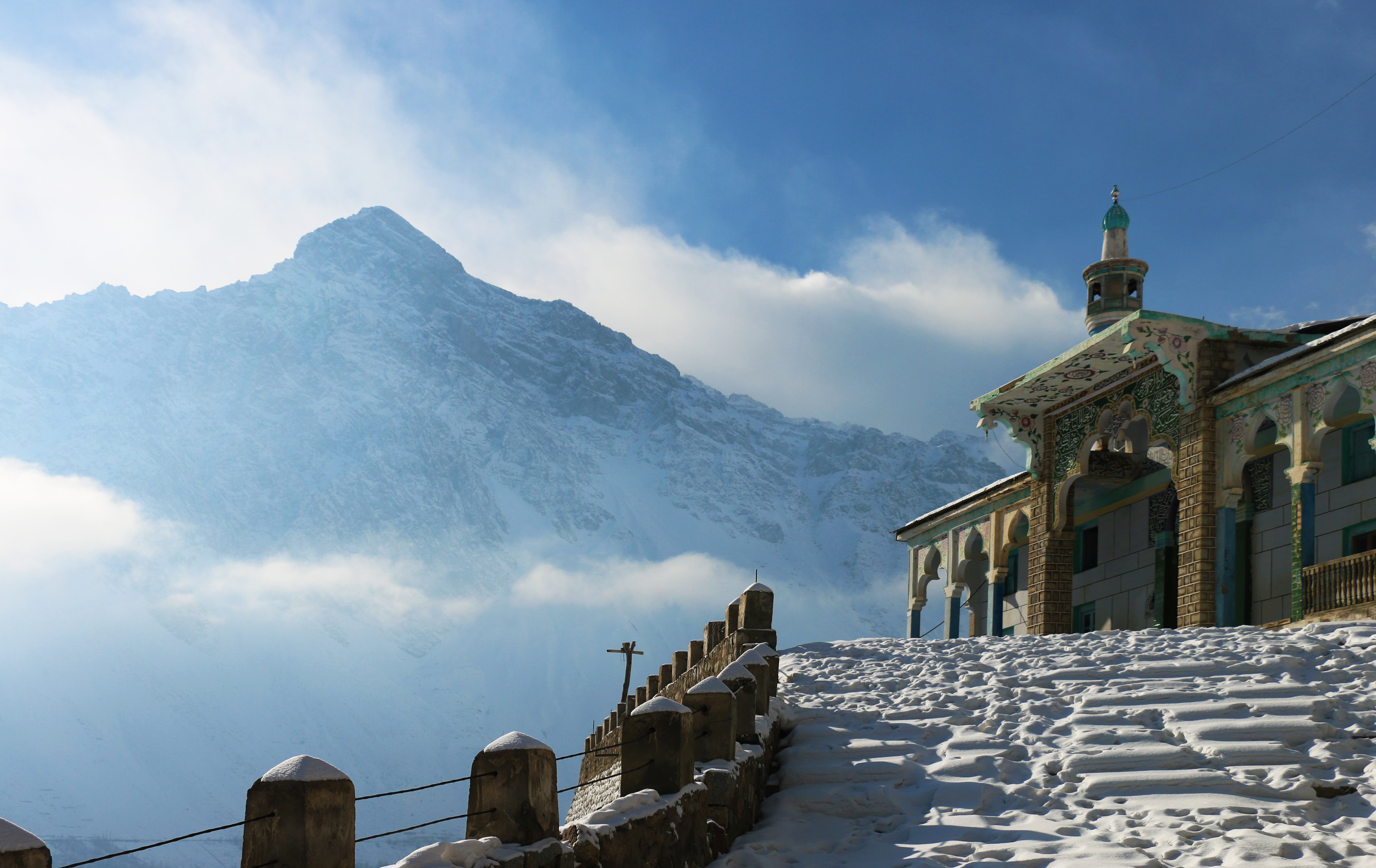
Imambara in a snowfall

This village goes back to the 14th century. Major landmarks and historical places of the village are:

- Imambara, Trespone
- Rhtsema Khar
- Jama Masjid
- Ranthaq (natural freezer and local water mill)
- Tchetche Broq (Mountain Range 5000mt ASL)
- Braq Kar (White Marble Mountain)
- Ashuna

Around 7000+ inhabitants live in around 14 mohallas. It was once ruled by the then-emperor, Tha Tha khan, a Buddhist by faith who later embraced Islam and married a Muslim women from the village.

The village got its name because of its vastness in area and the hospitality of the people. Lhunchey came from Lhang-Pho-Chey, which means elephant. An elephant is a bulky mammal and thus Lhunchey came into existence. In the 18th century, it got its name as Trespone. It is said that Trespone got its name from "tree-spoon".

The imambara of Trespone is a beautiful Tibetan-Persian mixed architecture monument situated on a hillock, which serves as a platform or viewpoint for the village and surrounding area. It has been renovated several times. As per local legends and folklore, it dates back to the 17th century. Below this place, there is a mohalla called Shagharan. The King of Karchey and his people used to go to this high place to watch and witness horse polo being played at Shagharan. Later, around 1765 AD, the imambara was erected. The last renovation was done in the year 1988. During the month of Muharram people would come to commemorate the martyrs of Karbala.

Rhtsema Khar is a ruined old fort situated alongside the imambara but on a higher hill. As per local traditions, it used to be a fort/army post during the kingdom era. Now it's a ruined monument with its walls intact. It can only be reached on foot.

Jama Masjid, one of the oldest mosques of Kargil, It was renovated in 2000.

Ranthaq (natural freezer and local water mill).

== Demographics ==
According to the 2011 census of India, Trespone has 419 households. The literacy rate of Trespone village is 59.51%. In Trespone, Male literacy stands at 70.44% while the female literacy rate was 48.03%.

Demographics (2011 Census)
	Total	Male	Female
Population	3332	1720	1612
Children aged below 6 years	573	306	267
Scheduled caste	0	0	0
Scheduled tribe	3239	1672	1567
Literacy	59.51%	70.44%	48.03%
Workers (all)	804	736	68
Main workers (all)	237	–	–
Marginal workers (total)	567	528	39

== Transport ==
=== Road ===
Trespone Village is well-connected by road to Kargil, Ladakh and the rest of India through NH 301. The NH301 (Kargil-Zanskar Highway) runs between the village. It has many connecting roads that link the mohallas of the village.

=== Rail ===
The nearest major railway station to Trespone is the Srinagar railway station located at a distance of 228 kilometres.

=== Air ===
The nearest airport is at Kargil located at a distance of 23 kilometres but it is currently non-operational. The next nearest major airports are Srinagar International Airport and Leh Airport located at a distance of 227 kilometres and 229 kilometres.

== See also ==
- Ladakh
- Sankoo district
- Sankoo
