= Eastern Mirror =

Indian English-language newspaper

- Journalism For Justice
- Type: Daily newspaper
- Format: Print, online
- Owner: Vimenuo Keditsü
- Publisher: Vimenuo Keditsü
- Editor: Khrietsonuo Rio
- Founded: 8 August 2002; 23 years ago
- Language: English
- Headquarters: Eastern Publication House, 797112, Circular Road, Dimapur
- Country: India
- Price: INR 5
- Website: easternmirrornagaland.com

Eastern Mirror is a daily English language newspaper published from Dimapur in the Indian state of Nagaland. Its head office is located at Signal Rio Colony, Dimapur.

== History ==
On 16 November 2015, Eastern Mirror along with four other state newspapers—Capi, The Morung Express, Nagaland Page and Tir Yimyim published their front page in blank to protest against a diktat from the Assam Rifles. The Assam Rifles had earlier in October ordered the editors to stop covering the rebel group—National Socialist Council of Nagaland - Khaplang (NSCN-K).

== See also ==
- List of newspapers in Nagaland
