= Itchoo =

Itchoo Itchu
- Village
- Location in Ladakh, India Itchoo (India)
- Coordinates: 34.20°N 76.20°E
- Country: India
- Union Territory: Ladakh
- District: Sankoo
- Tehsil: Sankoo

Population (2011)
  - Total: 159

Languages
  - Spoken: Purgi, Urdu
- Time zone: UTC+5:30 (IST)
- PIN: 194109

Itchoo or Itcho is a village in Sankoo tehsil in Sankoo district of the Indian union territory of Ladakh. The village is located 75 kilometres from Kargil.

== Demographics ==
According to the 2011 census of India, Itchoo had 53 households. The literacy rate of Itchoo village is 54.76%. In Itchoo, Male literacy stands at 67.19% while the female literacy rate was 41.94%.

Demographics (2011 census)
	Total	Male	Female
Population	159	76	83
Children aged below 6 years	33	12	21
Scheduled caste	0	0	0
Scheduled tribe	158	76	82
Literacy	54.76%	67.19%	41.94%
Workers (all)	36	33	3
Main workers (all)	6	–	–
Marginal workers (total)	30	28	2

== Transportation ==
Itchoo lacks transportation services as there is no road to this village. One has to take a trail from Barsoo village after reaching Barsoo from Sankoo by the Barsoo Road and NH 301. There is no rail or air connectivity to Itchoo. The nearest airport is at Leh, located at a distance of 300 kilometres.

== See also ==
- Ladakh
- Sankoo
- Drass
- Rangdum
