= Bano Haralu =

Indian journalist and conservationist

Bano Megolhusau Haralu

Director of Nagaland Wildlife and Biodiversity Conservation Trust

Personal details
- Occupation: journalist
- Awards: Chameli Devi Jain Award for Outstanding Women Mediapersons, Nari Shakti Puraskar

Bano Megolhusau Haralu is an Indian journalist and a conservationist from Nagaland. She worked with Doordarshan, NDTV and was the editor of Eastern Mirror. She was awarded the Chameli Devi Jain Award for Outstanding Women Mediapersons and Nari Shakti Puraskar. She is a Director of the Nagaland Wildlife and Biodiversity Conservation Trust.
