= Jammu and Kashmir Reorganisation Act, 2019 =

Act of the Indian Parliament

Parliament of India
- Long title: An Act to provide for the reorganisation of the existing State of Jammu and Kashmir and for matters connected therewith or incidental thereto.
- Citation: Act No. 34 of 2019
- Territorial extent: State of Jammu and Kashmir
- Enacted by: Rajya Sabha
- Enacted: 5 August 2019
- Enacted by: Lok Sabha
- Enacted: 6 August 2019
- Assented to: 9 August 2019
- Signed by: President Ram Nath Kovind
- Signed: 9 August 2019
- Effective: 31 October 2019

Legislative history

Initiating chamber: Rajya Sabha
- Bill citation: Bill No. XXIX of 2019
- Introduced by: Minister of Home Affairs; Amit Shah
- Introduced: 5 August 2019
- Passed: 5 August 2019
- Voting summary: (Voice Vote) 125 voted for; (Voice Vote) 61 voted against; 1 abstained

Revising chamber: Lok Sabha
- Received from the Rajya Sabha: 5 August 2019
- Passed: 6 August 2019
- Voting summary: 370 voted for; 70 voted against

Related legislation
- A number of orders for the adaptation of state laws and central laws to both union territories. Jammu and Kashmir Reorganisation (Amendment) Bill, 2021

Supreme Court cases
- Constitution bench of 5 judges held the act constitutionally valid.

Summary
- Bifurcates the State of Jammu and Kashmir into Union Territory of Jammu and Kashmir and the Union Territory of Ladakh and provides with legislative and executive powers related to state matters for Parliament to administer the territories.
- Status: In force

The Jammu and Kashmir Reorganisation Act, 2019 is an act of the parliament of India containing provisions to split the state of Jammu and Kashmir into two union territories: Ladakh and the residuary Jammu and Kashmir, and becoming effective on 31 October 2019. A bill for the act was introduced by the Minister of Home Affairs, Amit Shah, in the Rajya Sabha on 5 August 2019 and was passed on the same day. It was then passed by the Lok Sabha on 6 August 2019 and received the president's assent on 9 August 2019.

The act consists of 103 clauses, extends 106 central laws to the union territories, repeals 153 state laws, and abolishes the Jammu and Kashmir Legislative Council, among other things. The introduction of the bill was preceded by a presidential order which indirectly amended Article 370 of the Indian constitution and revoked Jammu and Kashmir's special status. The act has also given powers to the central government to pass a number of executive orders in relation to both the union territories. These orders have resulted in the modification or repeal of over 400 state and central laws with respect to the union territories. The act was challenged in the Supreme Court through a number of petitions. On 11 December 2023, the court declared the act and the related orders to be valid and constitutional, ordering to restore statehood "as soon as possible".

The combination of the presidential orders and enactment of the Reorganisation Act was followed by a security lockdown and communications blackout.

== Background ==
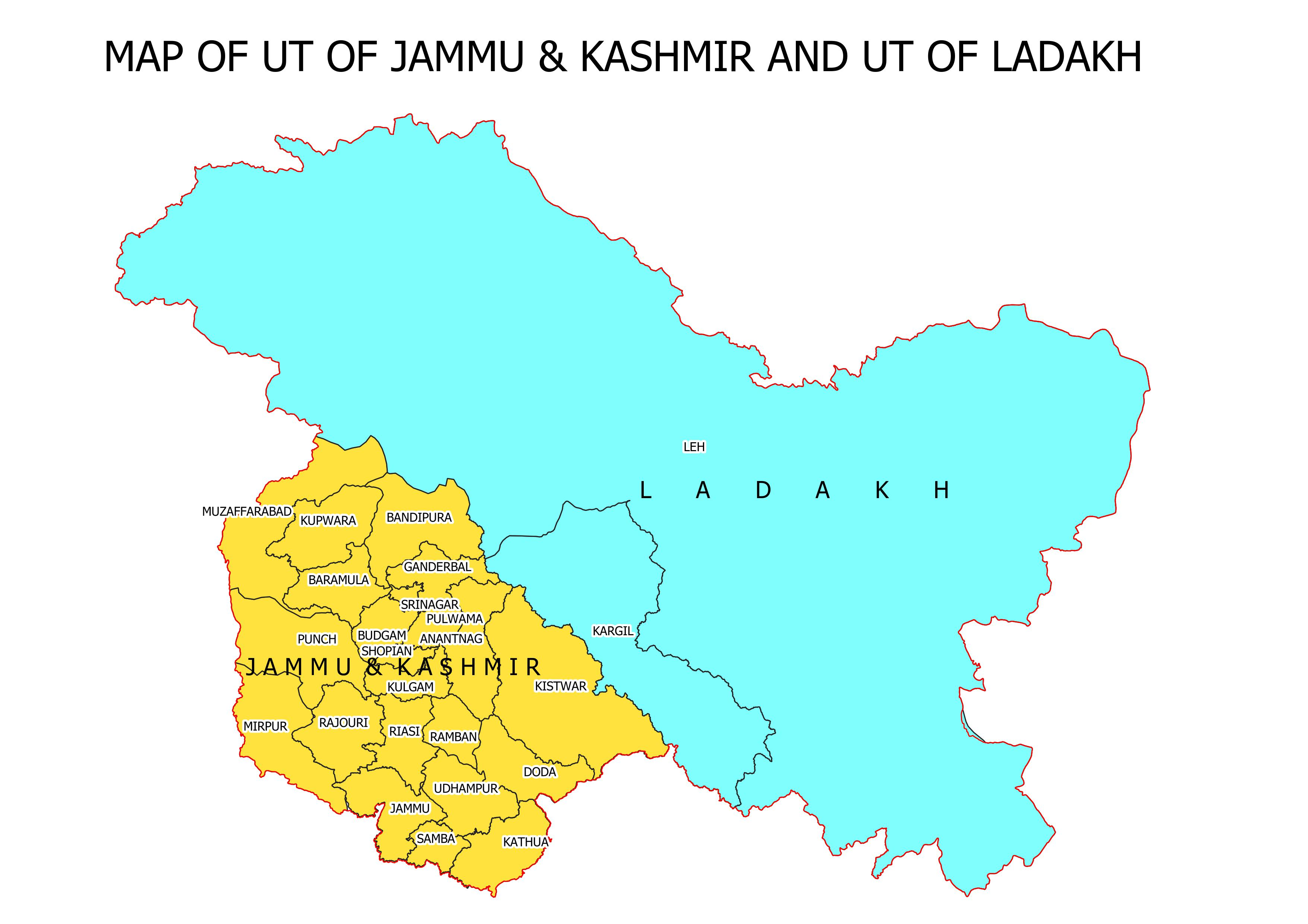
Map of the Union Territory of Jammu and Kashmir and the Union Territory of Ladakh as released by the Government of India.

Article 370 of the Indian constitution gave Jammu and Kashmir special status. In contrast to other states of India, Jammu and Kashmir had its own constitution and a substantially higher degree of administrative autonomy. In particular, Indian citizens from other states could not purchase land or property in Jammu and Kashmir.

Jammu and Kashmir had three distinct areas: overwhelmingly Muslim-majority Kashmir Valley (95% Muslim) with a population of nearly 7 million people, a Hindu-majority (66%) Jammu with a population of 5.35 million people and a 30% Muslim population, and Ladakh, which has sparse population of 287,000 people, a Muslim plurality, or relative majority, at 46%, and a Buddhist minority at 40% (with Hindus making up 12%). Violence and unrest persisted in the Muslim majority areas and, following a disputed state election in 1987, an insurgency persisted in protest over autonomy and rights. The Bharatiya Janata Party (BJP) came to power in the 2014 Indian general election and had included in their 2019 election manifesto the revocation of Article 370 of the Constitution of India.

Prior to the introduction of the bill and the revocation of the state's special status, the central government put the Kashmir Valley on lock-down, with a surge in security forces, imposition of Section 144 preventing assembly, and the placement of political leaders such as former Jammu and Kashmir chief ministers Omar Abdullah and Mehbooba Mufti under house arrest. The State had been first under governor's rule and then under president's rule since 20 June 2018, after the coalition government headed by Mehbooba Mufti lost support from the Bharatiya Janata Party. Additional 35,000 paramilitary troops were deployed to Jammu and Kashmir, prior to which a warning was issued to annual Hindu pilgrims and tourists citing a terror threat. The imposition of restrictions included the blocking of internet and phone services. The preemptive moves preceded the revocation of the state's special status and the passage of the Reorganisation Act.

== Statutory provisions ==
Blue area represents the former Indian-administered state of Jammu and Kashmir, green represents Pakistan-administered regions of Kashmir and yellow represents China-administered regions of Kashmir

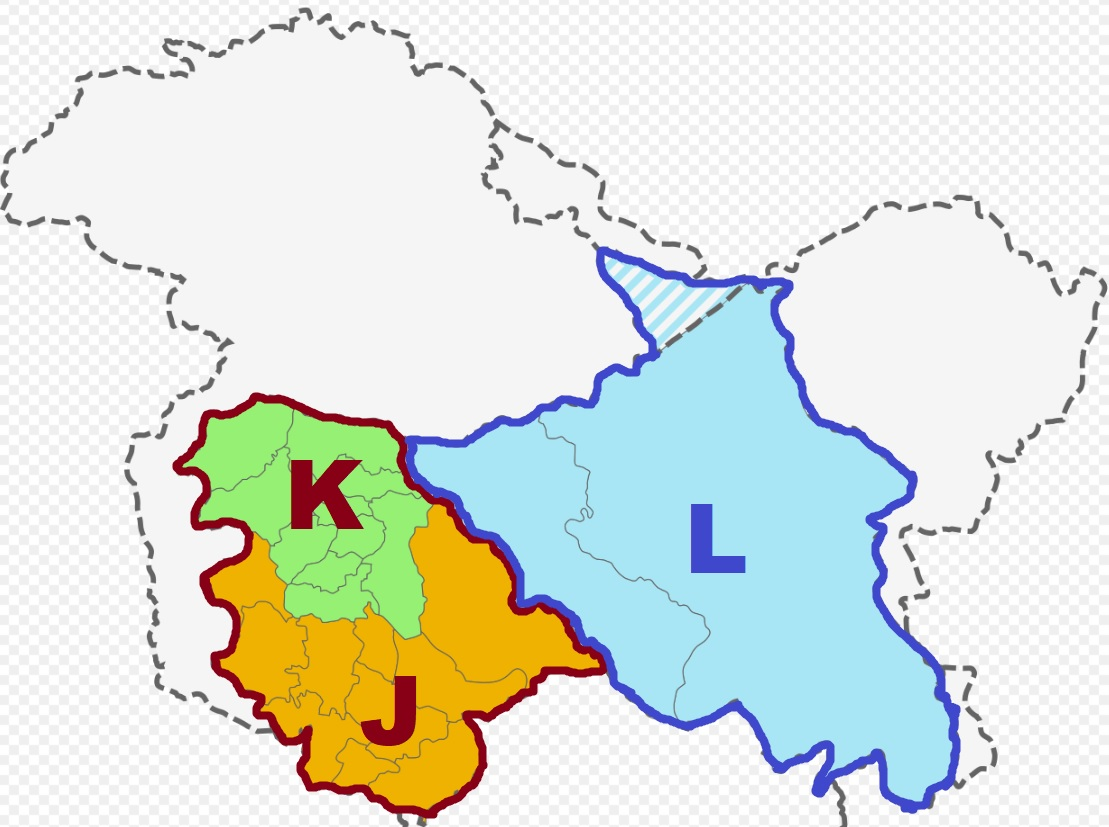
The two new Indian-administered union territories of Jammu and Kashmir and Ladakh have been created

The Jammu and Kashmir Reorganisation Act divides the Indian-administered state into two Indian-administered union territories, Jammu and Kashmir, and Ladakh. Whereas the former, Jammu and Kashmir, will have a legislative assembly, the latter, Ladakh, will be administered by a lieutenant governor alone. The union territory of Ladakh will include the districts of Leh and Kargil, while all other districts will be accorded to Jammu and Kashmir. Of six Lok Sabha seats allocated to the former state, one will be allocated to Ladakh and five to the Jammu and Kashmir union territory. The High Court of Jammu and Kashmir will function as the High Court for both the union territories.

The act provides that the administration of the Jammu and Kashmir will be as per Article 239A of the Indian constitution. Article 239A, originally formulated for the union territory of Puducherry, will also be applicable to Jammu and Kashmir. A lieutenant governor appointed by the president will administer the union territory of Jammu and Kashmir, which will have a legislative assembly of 107 to 114 members. The legislative assembly may make laws for any of the matters in the state list except "public order" and "police", which will remain as the law-making powers of the union government. A council of ministers including a chief minister will be appointed by the lieutenant governor from the members of the legislative assembly, with the role to advise the lieutenant governor in the exercise of functions in matters under the legislative assembly's jurisdiction. In other matters, the lieutenant governor is empowered to act in his own capacity, who will also have the power to promulgate ordinances having the same force as acts enacted by the legislature. The act abolishes the Legislative Council of the state of Jammu and Kashmir. It comprises 103 clauses which extend 106 central laws and 7 amended state laws, in part or as a whole, to the two union territories. The act also repeals 153 state laws and Governor's Acts.

== Enactment ==
Important dates leading up to the implementation of the Reorganisation Act
17 October 1949	Roots of Article 370 laid down in the Indian Constitution
14 May 1954	Constitution (Application to J&K) Order, 1954 (C.O. 48) adds Article 35A to the Constitution of India
1954 to 2011	Presidential orders extended 94 of the 97 subjects in the Union List to the State of Jammu and Kashmir, and 260 of the 395 Articles of the Constitution of India. These orders were amendments to the C.O. 48, not replacements.
5 August 2019	Constitution (Application to J&K) Order, 2019 (C.O. 272) passed, superseding C.O. 48. leading to abrogation of Constitution of Jammu and Kashmir and Article 35A.
5 August 2019	Rajya Sabha passes J&K Reorganisation Act, 2019
6 August 2019	Declaration under Article 370(3) of the Constitution (C.O. 273)
6 August 2019	Lok Sabha passes J&K Reorganisation Act, 2019
9 August 2019	Presidential assent for J&K Reorganisation Act, 2019
31 October 2019	Implementation of J&K Reorganisation Act, 2019

The passage of the Reorganisation Act, 2019 was part of a combination of moves by the government of India, including a presidential order C.O. 272 dated 5 August 2019 and a presidential declaration C.O. 273 dated 6 August 2019, aided by a parliamentary majority. These two orders together revoked the special status heretofore enjoyed by the state of Jammu and Kashmir.

=== C.O. 272, C.O. 273, statutory resolutions ===
Presidential order C.O. 272 and presidential declaration C.O. 273 resulted in the indirect and complete change of Article 370, the foundation on which the state had a special status. The 'indirect' amendment refers changes to Article 367 via C.O. 272 dated 5 August 2019; it caused all references to the Constituent Assembly of Jammu and Kashmir in Article 370(3) to be interpreted as the Legislative Assembly of Jammu and Kashmir.

As the state was under President's Rule at the time, the powers of the Legislative Assembly were entrusted to the Parliament of India. With this done, on the same day after C.O. 272 was issued, the Upper House of the Indian parliament passed a statutory resolution under Article 370(3) endorsing the same. The statutory resolution recommended that most of Article 370 cease to be operative, except the one which says that all provisions and amendments of the Constitution of India would be applicable to the state of Jammu and Kashmir. The next day, C.O. 273 put into effect Rajya Sabha's recommendation. C.O. 273 also supersedes the 1954 presidential order and has led to the abrogation of the Constitution of Jammu and Kashmir and Article 35A of the Constitution of India.

=== Voting in Parliament ===
The bill was introduced by Amit Shah, the Minister of Home Affairs, in the Rajya Sabha on 5 August 2019. Opposition was seen, two members of the Jammu and Kashmir People's Democratic Party (PDP) tore up copies of the Indian constitution in protest, following which they were suspended from the House; 13 members of the All India Trinamool Congress walked out of the House; and 6 members of Janata Dal (United) (allied to the ruling BJP) boycotted the voting. Opposition was also seen from Dravidian Progressive Federation, Nationalist Congress Party, Communist Party of India and Communist Party of India (Marxist). However, the bill acquired the support of Bahujan Samaj Party, YSR Congress Party, Telugu Desam Party and the Aam Aadmi Party. Along with the 107 members of the ruling National Democratic Alliance, the number of supporting parliamentarians totaled to 117. The bill also acquired the support of some independent and nominated members. It was passed by the Rajya Sabha with 125 members in favour and 61 members against.

The bill was introduced in the lower house of Indian parliament, Lok Sabha on 6 August 2019. The All India Trinamool Congress and Janata Dal (United) walked out from the house, while Indian National Congress, Nationalist Congress Party and Samajwadi Party opposed the bill; Bharatiya Janata Party, Shiv Sena, Biju Janata Dal, Telangana Rashtra Samithi, Shiromani Akali Dal, Lok Janshakti Party, Bahujan Samaj Party and others supported it. The bill was passed by the house with 370 votes in favour and 70 votes against.

Question before the Houses: The Question is that the Jammu & Kashmir Reorganisation Bill, 2019 be passed. The motion is put to vote.
Rajya Sabha; Voice Vote Count of members present; 5 August 2019		Lok Sabha; Electronic/Slip Vote Count of members present; 6 August 2019	
Ayes	125 / 209	Ayes	370 / 440
Noes	61 / 209	Noes	70 / 440
Abstentions	23 / 209	Abstentions	0 / 440
Result: The Ayes have it, the Ayes have it, the Ayes have it. The motion is adopted and the bill is passed.

=== Assent and publication ===
The bill received the assent of the president on 9 August 2019, subsequent to which it was published in The Gazette of India on the same date. A notification published on the same day provided for the union territories to come into effect from 31 October 2019.

The two union territories came into existence on 31 October 2019, which is celebrated as National Unity Day (marking the birth anniversary of Sardar Vallabhai Patel, who had a major role in the political integration of India). The president of India appointed a lieutenant governor for the Union Territory of Jammu and Kashmir and a lieutenant governor for the Union Territory of Ladakh. Both the lieutenant governors were sworn in by Justice Gita Mittal, the chief justice of Jammu and Kashmir (and Ladakh) High Court, on 31 October 2019, first at Leh and then at Srinagar. President's rule was revoked following bifurcation and newly applied to the union territories through the lieutenant governors.

== Legal challenges ==
The president's order under Article 370 made on August 5, 2019, the Jammu and Kashmir Reorganisation Bill and the two resolutions passed this week by parliament were conceived in malice and executed in deceit. [...] Have you ever heard of a state robbing its regions of autonomy because they have suffered terrorist attacks? [...] In the entire exercise, vile passions have triumphed over elementary concern with the law. The presidential order is patently unconstitutional. [...] the entire order is afflicted with defects... So, in consequence, is the entire Reorganisation Act which is based on it.

— A. G. Noorani, (13 August 2019, in The Wire)

From 9 August 2019 onwards, a number of petitions were filed that challenged the validity of the act. This includes petitions by members of parliament, former bureaucrats and military officers, advocates, lawyers, activists and non-governmental organisations. Members of parliament Mohammad Akbar Lone and Hasnain Masoodi of Jammu and Kashmir National Conference filed a petition in the Supreme Court on 10 August 2019 challenging the presidential orders and the Reorganisation Act 2019 together. With regard to the Reorganisation Act 2019 the petition challenges the downgrading of representation, the degradation and unilateral changes to constitutionalized federalism through the change from statehood to a union territory, and the right to autonomy as per the constitution. Further, the Reorganisation Act 2019 is challenged to be invalid as the presidential orders are also questionable. There are multiple reasons given for the invalidity of the presidential orders, including unconstitutionally using an article to amend itself in a way other than what was written in the constitution, making changes unilaterally, going against articles in the Constitution of Jammu and Kashmir, constitutional morality and arbitrariness. Jammu and Kashmir People's Conference has also challenged the presidential orders in court, deeming them invalid as per articles 14, 19 and 21 of the Indian Constitution, and that the will of the people of Jammu and Kashmir has not appropriately been taken into account. Further, as the changes were made during Governor's Rule, a temporary representative of the Union government itself, making permanent changes was unconstitutional.

On 5 August 2019, the Home Minister had stated that the reorganisation could be lifted and statehood restored. In October 2019, a spokesperson for the United Nations High Commissioner for Human Rights, Rupert Colville, stated that "The Supreme Court of India has been slow to deal with petitions concerning habeas corpus, freedom of movement and media restrictions". The Supreme Court stated that it would hear related pleas after its summer vacation in 2022.

== Reactions and aftermath ==
On 4 August 2019, People's Alliance for Gupkar Declaration, an alliance of several political parties in Jammu and Kashmir, unanimously passed a resolution— "That all the parties would be united in their resolve to protect and defend the identity, autonomy and special status of J&K against all attacks and onslaughts whatsoever. That modification, abrogation of Articles 35A, 370, unconstitutional delimitation or trifurcation of the State would be an aggression against the people of Jammu, Kashmir and Ladakh". On 5 and 6 August 2019, cross-party support for the creation of the union territory of Ladakh was seen in Leh, however Kargil leaders voiced opposition to its creation.

Gupkar Alliance passed another declaration to the same effect as the one in 2019 on 22 August 2020. Farooq Abdullah was released from preventive detention on 13 March 2020, Omar Abdullah on 24 March 2020 and Mehbooba Mufti on 13 October 2020. In Ladakh, by October 2020, a certain amount of apprehension over its status as a union territory had developed due to subsequent legislation and fears of losing jobs and land. The Leh unit of the BJP passed a resolution in the Ladakh Autonomous Hill Development Council to the same effect. Those in Kargil also continued with their disapproval of being included into the union territory of Ladakh. On 3 August 2020, P Chidambaram wrote "All major fundamental rights are effectively suspended" and that there was a "new" Kashmir issue, as opposed to the 1947 one before. Solidarity events between "Kashmiri and Palestinian networks" were also seen.

=== Movement and communication restrictions ===
House Foreign Affairs Committee
(@HouseForeign)
tweeted:

India's communication blackout in Kashmir is having a devastating impact on the lives and welfare of everyday Kashmiris. It’s time for India to lift these restrictions and afford Kashmiris the same rights and privileges as any other Indian citizen.
[Linked NYT article "In Kashmir, a Race Against Death, With No Way to Call a Doctor"]

7 October 2019

A security lockdown and communications blackout was extended throughout the new union territories in a pre-emptive manner. Restrictions in Kashmir continued for a longer duration than those in Jammu. Some parts of Jammu saw restrictions being lifted a few days later. Government of India data showed that thousands of arrests were made. Politicians, including three former Chief Ministers of Jammu and Kashmir, were put under preventive detention. The press in the region was heavily impacted. According to Access Now, the communications blackout was the longest any democracy has ever seen.

=== Civil society ===
Disappointment came about in Kashmir in the days post 5–6 August 2019. A fact finding team including Jean Drèze and Kavita Krishnan reported that "People expressed their anger freely in informal conversation, but no-one was willing to speak on camera", children were heard calling Modi 'Iblees' (meaning 'Satan'), and a man in Sopore said that the situation was "silence at gunpoint", and the peace was the "peace of a graveyard", while someone else said "It's Army rule not Modi rule". The newspaper Greater Kashmir had two pages devoted to the cancellation of weddings. With regard to pellet injuries, the fact finding team met two people with pellet injuries at SMHS Hospital. According to rights' groups, 412 habeas corpus petitions challenging detentions under the Jammu and Kashmir Public Safety Act, 1978 were filed after 5 August 2019.

=== National and international media ===
India is wedged between two nuclear-armed allies that routinely defy fundamental international rules and norms. Until China and Pakistan stop trying to undermine its territorial sovereignty in Jammu and Kashmir, India will have little choice but to take steps to protect itself.

— Brahma Chellaney, (2 September 2019, in Project Syndicate; Chellaney told ThePrint that this piece was picked up by "over 100 newspapers abroad")

International media frequently referred to the situation as a nuclear flashpoint.

In a statement BBC said that they "... strongly refute any claims that we have misrepresented events in Kashmir." Sevanti Ninan explains to ThePrint "For the foreign press, Kashmir is both a conflict zone, and disputed territory, and it covers it as such. After Kashmir's change of status, they think it is their job to capture protests, not to pander to the Indian government's sensitivities." Brahma Chellaney explains that this internationalisation was normal and that the real failure was the minimal number of Indians who wrote on international issues.

=== International community ===
The Jammu and Kashmir Reorganisation Act, 2019, has been subject to significant controversy and debates in the international community, with some countries questioning its legality and respect for democracy. On 8 August 2019, UN Secretary-General António Guterres stated his concern and called for "maximum restraint". He noted that "the position of the United Nations on this region is governed by the Charter of the United Nations and applicable Security Council resolutions."

China and Pakistan are the countries that have condemned India's decision most insistently. On 13 August 2019, Pakistan requested, and Permanent Member China supported, a consideration of this issue by the UN Security Council in 2019; many other countries reinforced these moves. Ambassador Zhang noted that Council members had "expressed their serious concern" and he expressed the general belief that the Kashmir controversy should be "resolved properly through peaceful means, in accordance with the UN Charter, the relevant Security Council resolutions and bilateral agreements."

The Jammu and Kashmir Reorganization Act, 2019, impacted India's regional security due to the deterioration of the bilateral relations with Pakistan since it increased the fresh military skirmishes along the Line of Control between these two nations. Pakistan has continuously criticized the Government of India's decision to remove Article 370 on grounds of its being unconstitutional and unacceptable, as it directly impacted people's fundamental rights. Pakistan's Ambassador, Maleeha Lodhi, said outside the UNSC chamber in August, 2019, that "the voice of the Kashmiri people resonated in the chambers of the world's highest diplomatic forum today. The whole world is discussing the occupied state. This is an international dispute."

On 16 August 2019 India's Ambassador, Syed Akbaruddin, said that "our national position was, and remains, that matters related to Article 370 of the Indian Constitution, are entirely an internal matter of India. The recent decisions taken by the Government of India and our legislative bodies are intended to ensure that good governance is promoted, socio-economic development is enhanced for our people in Jammu and Kashmir and Ladakh. India remains committed to ensure that the situation there remains calm and peaceful. We are committed to all the agreements that we have signed on this issue." He added "that all issues between India and Pakistan, as well as India and any other country, will be resolved bilaterally, peacefully, and in a manner that behooves normal inter-state relations between countries."

=== China and border skirmishes ===
On 6 August 2019, Chinese foreign affairs spokeswoman Hua Chunying opposed the integration of the "Chinese territory in the western sector of the China-India boundary" into India's administrative jurisdiction. In early October 2019, Chinese President Xi Jinping released a statement saying that the situation in Kashmir was being observed and that Pakistan had the support of China. On 31 October 2019, the Chinese Foreign ministry said that India's decision to unilaterally change its domestic laws and administrative divisions is void, illegal and will not affect "the fact that the area (Aksai Chin) is under Chinese actual control". In June 2020, Wang Shida of China Institutes of Contemporary International Relations linked the 2020–2021 China–India skirmishes to India's decision to change the status of Jammu, Kashmir and Ladakh. Indian diplomat Gautam Bambawale and Pravin Sawhney also held the same reasoning. A spokesman of the Embassy of the People's Republic of China in the Islamic Republic of Pakistan also linked the two in a tweet.

=== Restoration of statehood, delimitation and elections ===
The first elections in the union territory of Jammu and Kashmir took place in the last two months of 2020 in the form of by-elections to District Development Councils and municipal and panchayat level bodies. Even though 220 candidates were fielded by the Gupkar Alliance, some of those elected were dissatisfied post elections, accusing the government of creating a powerless body.

A fresh delimitation process for assembly constituencies began in February–March 2020. The Reorganisation Act has complicated the delimitation, with suspicion being created over whether the new seats would go to Kashmir or Jammu. At an all-party meet of Jammu and Kashmir leaders in New Delhi on 24 June 2021, statehood, delimitation and elections were discussed. During the meeting, restoration of statehood was raised; this was acknowledged by both the Prime Minister and the Home Minister.

=== Killings and militant recruitment ===
Between August 2019 and August 2021, 23 BJP leaders and workers (12 in Kashmir and 11 in Jammu) were killed. In the first six months of 2021, 89 militants died in roughly 47 gunfights in Kashmir. During October 2021, 13 civilians were killed; the highest death toll in a single month in the past two years, leading to the exodus of hundreds of migrant labourers and their families. Militant recruitment still occurs. Cross-border cease-fire violations along the Line of Control still occur resulting in deaths of civilians and security forces. While India's Multi-Agency Centre estimated that 55 terrorists crossed the LoC post 5 August in 2019, the military put the number much lower, adding that many infiltration attempts had been thwarted. In 2020, 60 security men were killed in the region.

=== Fundamental rights, human rights and civil rights ===
Members of 'The Forum for Human Rights in Jammu and Kashmir' came out with three reports post August 2019. The informal group, concerned about the situation of human rights in the state, included Justice Madan Lokur, Justice Hasnain Masoodi, Justice Ruma Pal, Justice Bilal Nazki, Justice Ajit Prakash Shah, Radha Kumar, Nirupama Rao, Shantha Sinha, Ramachandra Guha, Moosa Raza, Air Vice-Marshal (retd) Kapil Kak, Lieutenant-General (retd) H S Panag, Major-General (retd) Ashok K. Mehta and others. The first report, while condemning the situation of human rights in the state and that security concerns were being placed first, recommended— (sic) "release all remaining political detainees", "repeal the PSA and any other preventive detention legislation", "remove all restrictions on freedom of representation and expression", "release all detained juveniles and withdraw charges against them", "allow smooth passage for medical personnel and patients", "reinstate all the former state's statutory oversight bodies, especially those monitoring human rights, such as the Jammu and Kashmir Human Rights Commission", "encourage all shades of opinion to be freely and peacefully expressed, as the laws apply in every part of the Indian Union". The second report covered the period August 2020– January 2021 and stated that "most of the violations described in the forum's first report... remain even 18 months after the imposition of a lockdown on Jammu and Kashmir". The third report was published in August 2021, marking the completion of two years of changes in the state. The findings of the third report include:

The security situation has not improved; on the contrary, it has worsened. [...] Counter-insurgency concerns continue to be given priority... leading to an across-the-board vitiation of human and civil right protections. [...] the Jammu and Kashmir administration continues to oppose bail and stifle dissent on increasingly bizarre grounds [...] recruitment of cyber volunteers, to monitor... for 'anti-national' content. [...] Rates of domestic abuse, too, have increased drastically. Incidents of dowry – and/or wife burning, rarely heard before, have surfaced [...] Journalists have been harassed, assaulted and charged under UAPA.

However, considering the regions history including ethnic cleansing, many today still place public security, safety and order as paramount. In October 2019, India invited a group of largely right-wing MEP's, in their personal capacity, to the Kashmir Valley to see the on-ground situation. A third foreign delegation visited the region in February 2021; the envoys represented various countries including Brazil, Malaysia, Bolivia, Ghana and Kyrgyzstan.

Michelle Bachelet, the United Nations High Commissioner for Human Rights, put out a comment in September 2021, expressing concerns about the human rights situation in the state including the communication blackouts and stated,

..Ongoing use of the Unlawful Activities (Prevention) Act throughout India is worrying, with Jammu & Kashmir having among the highest number of cases in the country. While I acknowledge the Government's efforts to counter terrorism and promote development in the region, such restrictive measures can result in human rights violations and foster further tensions and discontent.

The Supreme Court of India also stated "freedom of internet access is a fundamental right" and that internet restrictions could not continue indefinitely.

== Subsequent legislation ==
=== Orders ===
Following the implementation of the Jammu and Kashmir Reorganisation Act, 2019, and through the powers given by the act, the central government of India further approved eight orders which provide for the adaption of state and central laws to the union territories. Five orders deal with the union territory of Jammu and Kashmir and three with the union territory of Ladakh. Through these executive orders the central government has made changes to, or repealed, over 400 laws in relation to the union territories by November 2020.

List of Jammu and Kashmir Reorganisation Orders

Jammu and Kashmir Reorganisation Orders
Date	Legislation	Notes
18.03.2020	J&K Reorganization (Adaptation of Central Laws) Order, 2020	A number of central acts extended to the UT including Code of Civil Procedure 1908 and Code of Criminal Procedure 1973
31.03.2020	J&K Reorganization (Adaptation of State Laws) Order, 2020	Repeals a number of state acts. Amends a number of state acts
20.05.2020	J&K Reorganization (Adaptation of State Laws) Second Order, 2020	Amends J&K Civil Services (Decentralization and Recruitment) Act, 2010
05.10.2020	J&K Reorganization (Adaptation of Central Laws) Second Order, 2020	Extends a number of central laws with amendments
05.10.2020	J&K Reorganization (Adaptation of State Laws) Third Order, 2020	Amends state acts to provide for the restructuring of different municipal bodies of the UT
16.10.2020	J&K Reorganization (Adaptation of State Laws) Fourth Order, 2020	Amends the J&K Panchayati Raj Act, 1989
26.10.2020	J&K Reorganization (Adaptation of State Laws) Fifth Order, 2020	Extends a number of central laws with amendments
26.10.2020	J&K Reorganization (Adaptation of Central Laws) Third Order, 2020	Amends a number of state acts. Repeals a number of state acts

==== Changes to domicile legislation ====
The Jammu and Kashmir Reorganisation (Adaptation of State Laws) Order, 2020 dated 31 March 2020 resulted in the complete repeal of 25 prior state laws. The remaining 113 state laws were adopted with changes. This move by the central government came under specific criticism for the changes to the Jammu and Kashmir Civil Services (Decentralization and Recruitment) Act, 2010 which resulted in a modification to the states' domicile laws. Previously, Article 370 reserved land and jobs only for 'permanent residents', the definition of which was altered to include domiciles through the approval of the new order. Under the new laws domiciles would be given jobs in the state. Among the various criteria under the modified law anybody who has "resided for a period of fifteen years in the Union territory of Jammu and Kashmir" or migrants registered by the Relief and Rehabilitation Commissioner of the union territory would be eligible for a domicile. A number of political parties including Jammu and Kashmir Apni Party and the Jammu unit of BJP opposed the order and showed discontentment, stating that there were no safeguards to protect the rights and privileges of the people of Jammu and Kashmir. On 3 April 2020, a fresh order was issued by the central government that made six changes to the previous order. Among the changes were providing protection to domiciles in any government post as compared to only selected posts before. A new order, the Jammu and Kashmir Reorganisation (Adaptation of State Laws) Second Order, 2020 was passed on 20 May 2020. This order modified applicability of domicile orders to "all level of jobs" in the union territory.

Jammu division saw 33,157 people applying for the domicile document between 18 May 2020 and 26 June 2020. Among them 25,000 domicile certificates were issued. Out of those applying, about 32,000 application were from Jammu, while Kashmir saw only 720 applications. Refugees from Pakistan and Valmikis are among those who have been issued the residency certificates; they came in the 1950s when sanitation workers in Jammu went on strike.

These changes in domicile rules have been compared academically to "post-colonial colonialism" and reinforcing settler colonialism in the region, and Patrick Wolfe's models of colonialism. Kashmiri author and academician Ather Zia holds the same views, "settler-colonial techniques in Kashmir predate the foreboding of the siege of August 2019". On the other hand, the change in residency rules have been seen to correct past injustices. For the first time, women from Jammu and Kashmir who married outside the state, can get domiciles. The spouse of natives can also apply for domicile.

==== Changes to land legislation ====
On 26 October 2020, the Union Territory of Jammu and Kashmir Reorganisation (Adaptation of Central Laws) Third Order, 2020 came into force. ANI reported that under the orders "12 state laws have been repealed and 26 others have been adapted with changes or substitutes". Among the changes were modifications to the land laws which now allowed those from other states to buy land in the UT. By August 2021, two people from outside of the union territory had bought property.

=== Amendments ===
==== First Amendment ====
G Kishan Reddy, the Minister of State for Home Affairs, introduced the Jammu and Kashmir Reorganisation (Amendment) Bill, 2021 to replace the existing ordinance for the same. The ordinance merged the Jammu and Kashmir cadre of civil services officers with the Arunachal Pradesh, Goa, Mizoram Union Territory (AGMUT) cadre. By 13 February 2021, both houses of the Parliament had passed the bill.

==== Second Amendment ====
In December 2023, the Jammu and Kashmir Reorganisation (Second Amendment) Bill was passed which would extend women reservation of 33% in Jammu & Kashmir on par with the One Hundred and Sixth Amendment of the Constitution of India.

== References and notes ==
Notes
