= 2026 Ladakh Autonomous Hill Development Council, Sankoo election =

2026 election to the Ladakh Autonomous Hill Development Council, Sankoo

- 4 December 2026

13 out of 16 seats in the Ladakh Autonomous Hill Development Council, Sankoo 7 seats needed for a majority

	Majority party	Minority party
Party	INC	BJP
Last election	New	New
Chief Executive Member after election
TBD

The 2026 elections to the Ladakh Autonomous Hill Development Councils (LAHDCs) are scheduled to be held on 4 December 2026. These will be the first LAHDC elections following the reorganisation of Ladakh into eight districts. In Sankoo, the council will have 13 elected seats.

== Schedule ==
Poll event	Date
Last date for making nominations	17 November 2026
Scrutiny of nominations	18 November 2026
Last date for withdrawal	20 November 2026
Polling	4 December 2026
Completion of election process	8 December 2026

== Candidate ==
Constituency-wise Candidate per party
Constituency		Party			
#	Name	INC	BJP	IND	Total
1	Barsoo	1	0	2	3
2	Bartoo	1	0	1	2
3	Thang Dumbure	0	1	1	2
4	Nagma Kusar	1	1	2	4
5	Lankerchay	0	1	1	2
6	Thasgam Thuvina	0	0	2	2
7	Sangrah	1	1	0	2
8	Namsuru	1	0	1	2
9	Parkachik	0	1	2	3
10	Panikhar Taisuru	0	0	2	2
11	Saliskote	0	1	2	3
12	GM Pore-Tambis	1	1	5	7
13	Trespone	1	1	0	2
—	—	7	8	21	36

== Results ==
–	–	–
INC	BJP	IND

Vote share of different parties in the election
1. INC (0.00%)
2. BJP (0.00%)
3. IND (0.00%)

=== Results by constituency ===
Constituency-wise results
Constituency		Winner			Runner-up			Margin
No	Name	Name	Party	Votes	Name	Party	Votes	Margin
1	Barsoo							
2	Bartoo							
3	Thang Dumbure							
4	Nagma Kusar							
5	Lankerchay							
6*	Thasgam Thuvina							
7*	Sangrah							
8	Namsuru							
9	Parkachik							
10*	Panikhar Taisuru							
11*	Saliskote							
12*	GM Pore-Tambis							
13	Trespone							

*seats are reserve for women only

== See also ==
- Ladakh Autonomous Hill Development Council, Sankoo
- 2026 elections in India
