= Chameli Devi Jain Award for Outstanding Women Mediapersons =

Journalism award in India

Chameli Devi Jain Award for Outstanding Woman Mediaperson
- Awarded for: Journalism award in India for women
- Sponsored by: The Media Foundation
- First award: 1981
- Final award: 2024

Highlights
- Total awarded: 54
- First winner: Neerja Chowdhury
- Last winner: Ritika Chopra, Greeshma Kuthar
- Website: https://www.themediafoundation.in/awards/

Chameli Devi Jain Award for Outstanding Woman Mediaperson is an Indian journalism award named after Chameli Devi Jain, an Indian independence activist who became the first Jain woman to go to prison during India's independence struggle. The award was instituted in 1980 by The Media Foundation and is given to women in the field of journalism. According to Business Standard, the award is "perhaps India's longest running media award for women".

The Media Foundation was founded in 1979 by B. G. Verghese, Lakshmi Chand Jain, Prabhash Joshi, Ajit Bhattacharjea and N. S. Jagannathan. The award was instituted in 1980 by Verghese and the family of Chameli Devi. The criteria for selection include social concern, dedication, courage and compassion in the individual's work. Journalists in print, digital and broadcast are eligible including photographers, cartoonists and newspaper designers; the entries are judged by an independent jury. Preference is given to rural or small-town journalists and journalists in regional Indian languages.

Neerja Chowdhury won the inaugural award in 1981. In 2015, Supriya Sharma of Scroll.in became the first online journalist to receive the award.

== Recipients ==
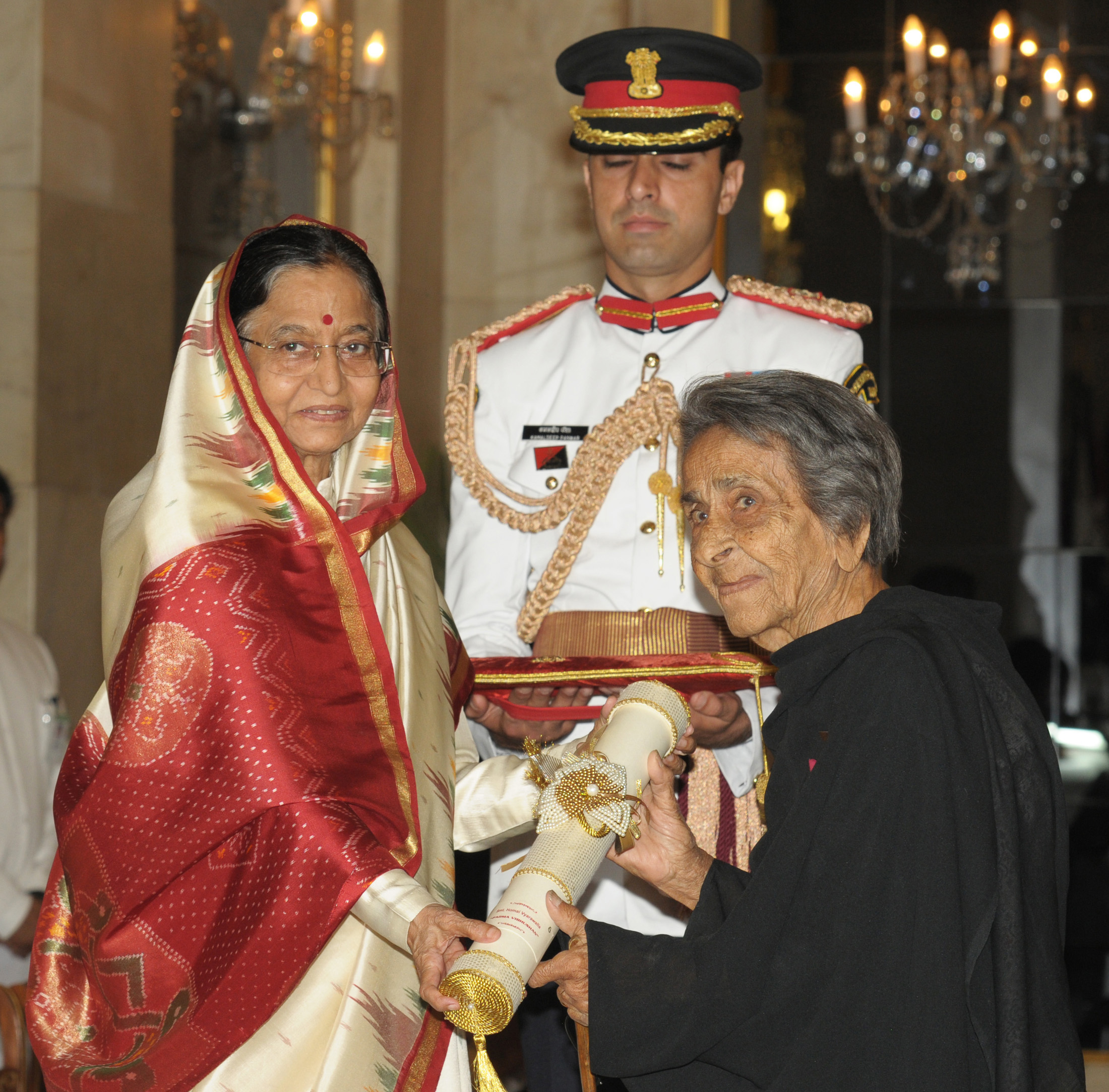
Homai Vyarawalla (right), winner of the 1998 Chameli Devi Jain Award, receiving the Padma Vibhushan from the President of India in 2011.

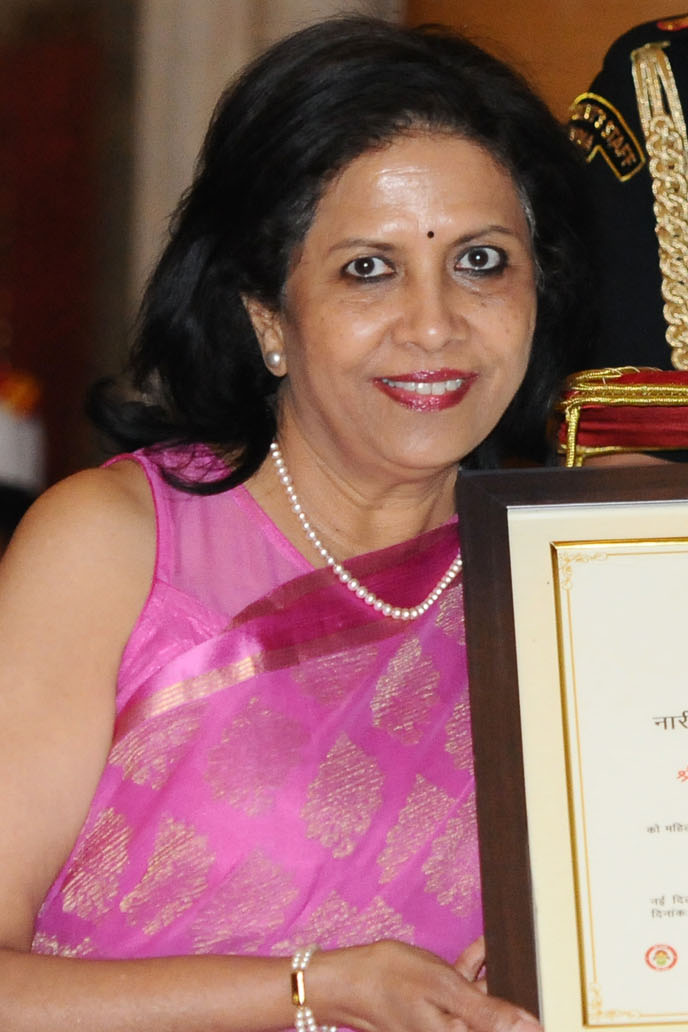
Pushpa Girimaji, winner of the 1991 Chameli Devi Jain Award.

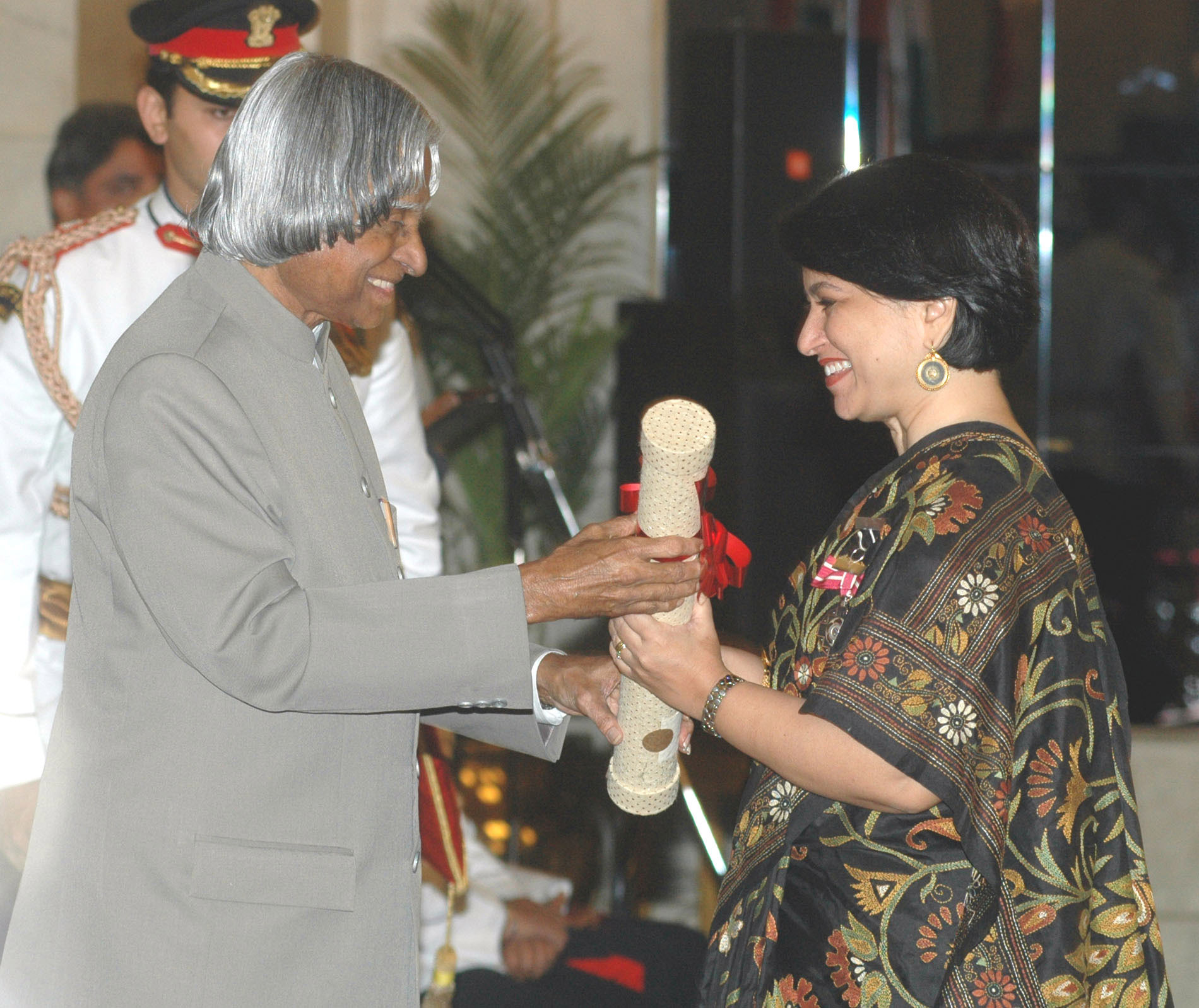
Sucheta Dalal (right), winner of the 1992 Chameli Devi Jain Award, receiving the Padma Shri from the President of India in 2006.

Year	Recipient(s)	Associated media house(s)/notes	Ref.
1981	Neerja Chowdhury	The Statesman; The Indian Express	
1982	Prabha Dutt Sevanti Ninan	– –	
1983	Shahnaz Anklesaria Aiyar Sakuntala Narasimhan	–	
1984	Sheela Barse	–	
1985	Madhu Purnima Kishwar	–	
1986	Kalpana Sharma	Himmat; The Indian Express; The Times of India	
1987	No winner	–	
1988	Tavleen Singh	India Today; The Indian Express	
1989	Chitra Subramaniam	India Today	
1990	Usha Rai	–	
1991	Pushpa Girimaji Mediastorm Collective (Note: Shohini Ghosh, Ranjani Mazumdar, Sabina Kidwai, Shikha Jhingan, Sabeena Gadihoke and Charu Gargi)	– –	
1992	Sucheta Dalal Teesta Setalvad	The Times of India; The Indian Express	
1993	Sheela Bhatt Alka Raghuvanshi Manimala	India Today	
1994	Shubha Singh	The Telegraph; The Pioneer; The Khaleej Times	
1995	Patricia Mukhim	The Shillong Times	
1996	Annam Suresh Rehana Hakim	– –	
1997	Anita Pratap	CNN; Time	
1998	Homai Vyarawalla	–	
1999	Barkha Dutt Pamela Philipose Vasavi Kiro	NDTV; The Times of India; Prabhat Khabar	
2000	Kunjal Paanje Kutchji	Kutch Mahila Vikas Sangathan	
2001	Bano Haralu	Eastern Mirror	
2002	Shikha Trivedi	–	
2003	Sonu Jain Chitrakoot Rural Women's Collective	The Indian Express; Khabar Lahariya	
2004	Sunita Narain	Down to Earth magazine	
2005	Ratna Bharali Talukdar	–	
2006	Nilanjana Bose Sreerekha B	CNN-IBN; Vanitha	
2007	Rupashree Nanda	CNN-IBN	
2008	Nirupama Subramanian Vinita Deshmukh	The Hindu	
2009	Monalisa Changkija Shoma Chaudhury	Nagaland Page; Tehelka	
2010	Shahina K. K.	Open	
2011	Tusha Mittal	Tehelka	
2012	Alka Dhupkar	IBN Lokmat	
2013	Anubha Bhonsle	CNN-News18	
2014	Supriya Sharma	Scroll.in	
2015	Priyanka Kakodkar Raksha Kumar	The Times of India –	
2016	Neha Dixit	–	
2017	Uma Sudhir	NDTV	
2018	Priyanka Dubey	BBC	
2019	Arfa Khanum Sherwani Rohini Mohan	The Wire –	
2020	Neetu Singh	Gaon Connection	
2021	Aarefa Johari	Scroll.in	
2022	Dhanya Rajendran	The News Minute	
2024	Ritika Chopra Greeshma Kuthar	The Indian Express –	

Note that before 2024 the award made in one year was named for the previous year, thus the award made in March 2023 was the 2022 award, but in 2024 the system changed and the award made in March 2024 was called the 2024 award.

== See also ==
- Ramnath Goenka Excellence in Journalism Awards
