= Anubha Bhonsle =

Indian journalist (born 1978)

- Born: 3 April 1978 (age 48)
- Years active: 1999 to Present
- Employer: CNN-News18
- Known for: Journalist, politics, social change
- Awards: 2012 - Best Political Reporter, 2013 - Best Reporter

Anubha Bhonsle is an Indian TV and print journalist and an author. She currently works as Executive Editor of CNN-News18.

== Career ==
Bhonsle started her career with The Indian Express in 1999 and then moved to be part of Miditech, the Zee Group. From there she joined New Delhi Television where she was part of the political bureau and an anchor. Bhonsle joined CNN-News18 at inception, as prime-time anchor and Senior Editor.

Bhonsle researched on America's political history and the role of gender and race during her fellowship. She has taken up social issues and along with her team has led important projects. She has performed in-depth reporting from the North East, Kashmir, Uttar Pradesh and other parts of India. Her reports on marginalized people in society have brought her particular recognition. She has also been noted for her show, 'Paisa Power Politics', exploring issues of political campaign financing.

She edits the Citizen Journalist Show and reports from Kashmir and the North East regularly. As part of her fellowship for the People's Archive of Rural India (PARI), Anubha along with journalist and film maker Sunzu Bachaspatimayum have produced three short films and reportage on the lives and traditions of the Meitei community of Manipur. She published her reportage about Manipur insurgency and Irom Sharmila's struggle against Armed Forces (Special Powers) Act in the form of a book Mother, Where’s My Country? in 2016.

== Awards ==
Anubha Bhonsle won Ramnath Goenka Excellence in Journalism Awards 2009 and Chameli Devi Award for outstanding woman media person.

== Selected publications ==
- — (22 August 2014). "A democracy of armed soldiers". The Hindu.
- — (2 August 2013). "The Girl Without a Face". The New York Times.
- — (3 June 2013). "Of uncomfortable spaces". The Hindu. Archived from the original on 31 August 2014.
