= Gund Mangalpore =

Gund Mangalpore in Ladakh in India

Gund Mangalpore Gound Mangal Pore
- Village
- Location of Gund Mangalpore in Ladakh, India Gund Mangalpore (India)
- Coordinates: 34°29′42″N 76°07′18″E
- Country: India
- Union territory: Ladakh
- District: Sankoo
- Tehsil: Gound Mangal Pore

Population (2011)
  - Total: 7,850
- Time zone: UTC+5:30 (IST)

Gund Mangalpore (frequently abbreviated as G.M. Pore or G.M. Pur) is a village and one of the tehsil in the Sankoo district of Ladakh, India.

== Demographics ==
According to the 2011 Census of India, Gund Mangalpur recorded a total population of 1,894 across approximately 257 households.

Demographics of Gund Mangalpur (2011 Census)
Parameter	Total	Male	Female
Population	1894	948	946
Children (0–6 years)	363	174	189
Literacy Rate	60.48%	72.74%	47.95%
Scheduled Tribes	1761	873	888

== See also ==
- Tourism in Ladakh
- Sankoo
- Sankoo district
