= Uma Sudhir =

Indian journalist

Uma Sudhir is an Indian journalist, who was the executive editor of the South Indian division of the television news network NDTV. She resigned from NDTV on 14 February 2026, after 27 years in the company. Sudhir has been the recipient of a number of awards including the Ramnath Goenka Excellence in Journalism Award and the Chameli Devi Jain Award for Outstanding Women Mediapersons.

== Biography ==
Born in the city of Thiruvananthapuram, Uma spent her childhood in a number of cities around India such as Mumbai and Hyderabad, and eventually completed her schooling and her undergraduate studies in New Delhi. She entered the field of journalism through a one year programme at the Times School of Journalism in 1989 and began her career at The Times of India in New Delhi. She is noted have been the features editor of the newspaper during Miss Universe 1994 and was the one to cover Sushmita Sen winning the peagant. Uma married a peer journalist T. S. Sudhir and moved to the city of Hyderabad around August 1995.

She was responsible for the political coverage of N. Chandrababu Naidu's rebellion against N. T. Rama Rao in the state of Andhra Pradesh which began days after her shifting to its capital of Hyderabad. During her employment at the Times Group, she had also been involved in working with its business news, The Economic Times. In 1998, Uma moved to the new television channel Star News (later renamed to NDTV). Over the following period, she was appointed as the resident editor in the city of Hyderabad and eventually became the executive editor of the South Indian division of the television network of NDTV.

In 2015, she won the Ramnath Goenka Excellence in Journalism Award in the category of broadcast journalism. On 6 March 2017, she also became the recipient of the Chameli Devi Jain Award for Outstanding Women Mediapersons for "[h]er incisive and analytical reports [that] help create awareness of ground realities in various states". She has also been recognised by the Confederation of Indian Industry as an industry leader in her field of work.

== Personal life ==
Uma is married to TS Sudhir, a Chevening scholar from Palakkad, Kerala.

== Controversy ==
Uma Sudhir was engulfed in controversy related to her spouse TS Sudhir during MeToo movement in India.
