= Meeting with leaders from Jammu and Kashmir (2021) =

All-party meet on Jammu and Kashmir
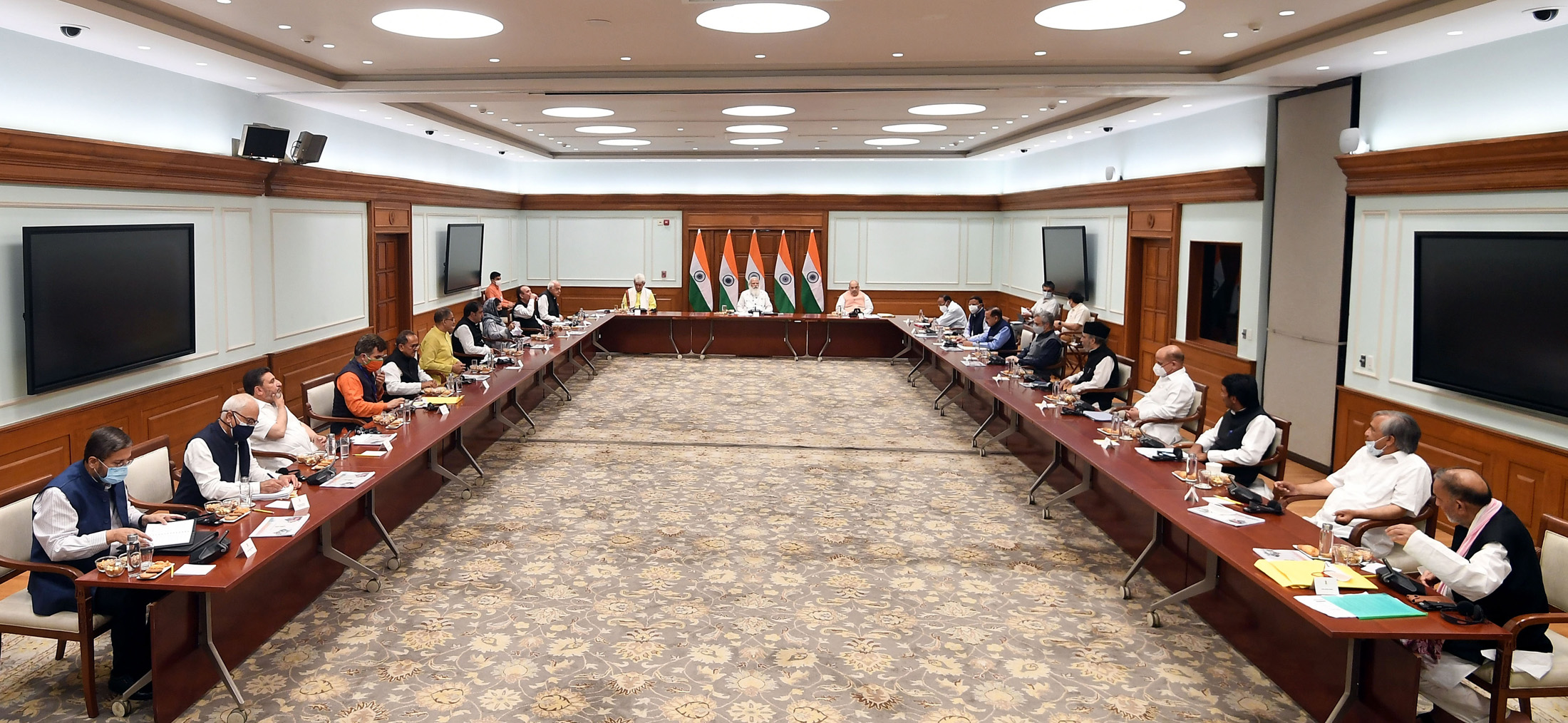
- Date: 24 June 2021
- Venues: 7, Race Course Road, New Delhi
- Participants: Four former chief ministers of Jammu and Kashmir, four former deputy chief ministers of Jammu and Kashmir, and other mainstream politicians from the region. Prime Minister of India, Union Minister of Home Affairs, National Security Advisor of India and the Lieutenant Governor of Jammu and Kashmir

On 24 June 2021 the first major interaction between leaders of Jammu and Kashmir and the Union Government of India post revocation of the former states special status and its reorganisation took place.

== Attendees ==
Narendra Modi, the Prime Minister of India, chaired the meeting which was held in New Delhi. The leaders from Jammu and Kashmir included four former chief ministers of the state, Farooq Abdullah, Omar Abdullah, Ghulam Nabi Azad and Mehbooba Mufti; four former deputy chief ministers, Kavinder Gupta, Nirmal Kumar Singh, Tara Chand, Muzaffar Hussain Baig, and other mainstream politicians from the region such as Jitendra Singh, Sajjad Lone, Bhim Singh, Ghulam Ahmad Mir, Altaf Bukhari and Mohammed Yousuf Tarigami. The politicians represented eight mainstream political parties with presence in Jammu and Kashmir— Indian National Congress, National Conference, Peoples Democratic Party, Apni Party, Bharatiya Janta Party, Communist Party of India (Marxist), National Panthers Party and People's Conference. Also present were Amit Shah, the Union Minister of Home Affairs; Ajit Doval, the National Security Advisor of India; and Manoj Sinha, the lieutenant governor of Jammu and Kashmir.

== Pre-meeting ==
Various reasons had been cited by the media for holding the meeting, from back-channel talks to changing geo-politics, to speculation on the topics which would be discussed ranging from further bifurcation, administrative issues to the need to chalk out an outline for the next few months. Officially there was no pre-decided agenda for the meeting.

== Proceedings ==
Topics discussed included strengthening the democratic processes of the region, release of political prisoners, delimitation, assembly elections and restoration of statehood. Everyone got a chance to speak. There was no "grand announcements" following the meeting. Article 370 did not take up too much time of the meeting, with general agreement that the decision of the Supreme Court would be waited for. Commentators noted that all the attendees said that the meeting was in a "cordial" and "friendly atmosphere".

== Commentary ==
Following the meeting Lt Gen Syed Ata Hasnain (Retd) commented,

Peace building and furtherance of narratives by consensus seem to have been the purpose of the meeting without agenda... With the UT administration making strident efforts at enhancing the efficiency of governance and reducing corruption along with a genuine outreach to the citizens, fresh hopes of a better future seemed to develop in the people, although alienation was by no means overcome. Many became fence sitters and those actively involved in street agitation took a back seat since the security forces ensured effective clampdown and the separatist leaders were all detained [...] Although one was keenly looking out for political statements after the three-hour talks, it is only prudent not to expect any outcomes from what should be the first of many such meetings... Hopefully this will just be the beginning of more consultation and opinion-sharing, both dire needs.

Radha Kumar commented that,

All attendees agreed that it was a cordial meeting and each participant spoke his or her mind. [...] Beyond the atmospherics, there appears to have been little to welcome. [...] Much depends on whether the Modi administration treats this meeting as an initial discussion to be followed by a series of meetings negotiating the issues raised at it...

There was also general criticism against the meeting.

== See also ==
- Meeting at Hendaye
- First Ma–Xi meeting
