= Neerja Chowdhury =

Indian journalist, columnist

Neerja Chowdhury is an Indian journalist, columnist and political commentator. Chowdhury was the political editor of the Indian Express for ten years, and is currently a contributing editor for the Indian Express.

== Awards ==
In 1981 Chowdhury won the inaugural Chameli Devi Jain Award for Outstanding Women Mediapersons. In 2009 she was awarded the Prem Bhatia Award.

== Books ==
- How Prime Ministers Decide. Rupa Publications, 2023. ISBN 9789390652457
