= List of districts of Ladakh =

Districts of Ladakh, Indian-administered Kashmir

As of 2026, the Indian-administered union territory of Ladakh in the disputed Kashmir region consists of 8 notified districts. They include Kargil (with 45 revenue villages), Drass (19), Sankoo (35), Sham (27), Changthang (24), Nubra (30), Leh (44) and Zanskar (26), with a total of 250 revenue villages. Out of the eight districts, first three are Muslim majority while the rest have a Buddhist majority.

Ladakh has no union territory level legislature, but sends a single member of parliament. Autonomous district councils are present in all 8 districts in ladakh. Ladakh Autonomous Hill Development Council work with village panchayats to take decisions on economic development, healthcare, education, land use, taxation, and local governance under UT Administration’s oversight.

== History ==
=== 1846-1947: Princely state of Jammu and Kashmir ===
Prior to 1947, Ladakh was part of Kashmir when Jammu and Kashmir was a princely state under the paramountcy of the British Indian Empire. The central part of the princely state was administratively divided into the provinces Jammu and Kashmir. In addition there were frontier districts and semi-autonomous jagirs (principalities). They were subdivided as follows:

- Jammu and Kashmir core
  - Jammu province: Districts of Jammu, Udhampur and Mirpur (later became part of Azad Kashmir)
  - Kashmir province: Districts of Anantnag, Baramulla and Muzaffarabad (Muzzafarabad later became part of Azad Kashmir).
  - Internal jagirs within Jammu and Kashmir: Poonch (half of it later became part of Azad Kashmir), Chenani and Bhaderwah.
- Frontier districts:
  - Ladakh district with three sub-districts: Leh, Kargil and Skardu (Skardu later became part of Gilgit-Baltistan).
  - Gilgit district with two sub-districts: Gilgit and Astore. (Both later became part of Gilgit-Baltistan)
  - Frontier ilaqas (areas): Punial, Ishkoman, Yasin, Kuh Ghizar, Hunza, Nagar and Chilas (all of these regions later became part of Gilgit-Baltistan).

The Gilgit district and the frontier ilaqas were administered by the British administration as the Gilgit Agency, which were returned to the princely state prior to the Partition of India.

=== 1947-present ===
Headquarters of districts of Ladakh.

After the accession of Jammu and Kashmir to the Indian Union, it consisted of three divisions: the Jammu Division, the Kashmir Division and Ladakh.

==== 2019: Ladakh as an Independent Union Territory ====
In 2019, as per the Jammu and Kashmir Reorganisation Act, Ladakh became a separate Union Territory. At that time, Ladakh had two districts, the Shia Muslim-majority Kargil district with 99 revenue villages and the Buddhist-majority Leh district with 151 revenue villages.

==== 2026:6 new districts in Ladakh Union Territory ====
On 27 April 2026, 5 new districts were notified in the government gazette for boosting the service delivery and infrastructure, taking the number of districts in Ladakh to 7. Three new districts Nubra, Sham, and Changthang were carved out of the Leh district; while Zanskar and Drass were carved out of the Kargil district. This reorganisation saw Leh district with 44 revenue villages, Nubra with 30, Changthang with 24, Kargil with 80, Sham with 27, Drass with 19, and Zanskar with 26 revenue villages. These districts, earlier announced on 26 August 2024, were awaiting the formal notification for the creation. 6 new tehsils, 9 niabats (sub-tehsils), and 18 Patwar circles were also created. More than 97% of the population in these new districts are various Scheduled Tribes, including the Balti Shia, Boto, Brokpa, and Changpa communities. Since announcement in 2024, the Ladakh administration has been constructing the physical infrastructure (buildings, etc) on the land identified in Khaltsi (Sham), Diskit (Nubra), Nyoma (Changthang), Padum (Zanskar), and Drass for the District Collectorate complexes. 359 gazetted jobs via UPSC and nearly 4,000 non-gazetted jobs via the Ladakh Subordinate Services Staff Selection Board were recruited in 2026 for these new offices.

On 16 October 2026, one more district named Sankoo district announced, taking the number of districts in Ladakh to 8. Also 5 more new tehsil were announced formally, taking the number of tehsil in Ladakh to 37.

== List of districts ==
#	District	Headquarters	Established	Subdivisions	Tehsils	Area	Population (2011)	Autonomous District Council	Map
1	Changthang	Nyoma	2026	Nyoma; Durbuk	Nyoma; Anlay; Tangtse; Chumathang; Himya	10,610 km^{2} (4,100 sq mi)	13,000	LAHDC Changthang	
2	Drass	Drass-Ranbirpura	2026	Drass	Drass; Thasgam	2,036 km^{2} (786 sq mi)	21,998	LAHDC Drass	
3	Kargil	Kargil	1979	Shakar Chiktan	Kargil; Shakar Chiktan; Shargole; Sodh	2,700 km^{2} (1,000 sq mi)	140,802	LAHDC Kargil	
4	Leh	Leh	1979	Kharu	Leh; Chushot; Kharu; Basgo; Gia	12,110 km^{2} (4,680 sq mi)	133,487	LAHDC Leh	
5	Nubra	Diskit	2026	Nubra	Diskit; Sumoor; Panamic; Turtuk; Khalsar; Charasa	11,500 km^{2} (4,400 sq mi)	22,433	LAHDC Nubra	
6	Sankoo	Sankoo	2026	Sankoo	Sankoo; Taisuru; Gound Mangal Pore; TSG	2,600 km^{2} (1,000 sq mi)	40,548	LAHDC Sankoo	
7	Sham	Khalatse	2026	Likir; Khalatse	Khalsi; Temisgam; Wanla; Skurbuchan; Saspol; Aryan Valley	11,000 km^{2} (4,200 sq mi)	33,000	LAHDC Sham	
8	Zanskar	Padum	2026	Zanskar	Padum; Zangla; Lungnak; Chah; Phey	6,688 km^{2} (2,582 sq mi)	13,793	LAHDC Zanskar	
—	Total			10	37	59,146 km^{2} (22,836 sq mi)	274,289	8	

^{†} Area and population figures for districts established in 2026 are provisional estimates based on the 2011 Census and administrative boundaries and are not official figures.

== See also ==
- Geography of Ladakh
- Tourism in Ladakh
- List of districts in Gilgit-Baltistan, Pakistan-administered claimed-by-India
