= Sankoo district =

District of Ladakh, India

- District of Ladakh
- Interactive map of Sankoo district
- Coordinates: 34°17′23″N 75°57′44″E
- Country: India
- Union Territory: Ladakh
- Headquarter: Sankoo
- Established: 16 October 2026

Government
  - Lok Sabha constituencies: Ladakh
  - MP: Mohmad Haneefa

Population (2011)
  - Total: 40,548

Languages
  - Official: Hindi, English, Ladakhi, Urdu and Purgi
  - Spoken: Shina, Balti, Tibetan
- Time zone: UTC+05:30 (IST)

Sankoo district, with headquarter at Sankoo, is a district in the Union Territory of Ladakh in India.

== History ==
Sankoo district, with headquarter at Sankoo was announced on 16 October 2026 by Lieutenant Governor Vinai Kumar Saxena describing it as the fulfilment of a long-standing aspiration of local residents.

== Administration ==
Sub–divisions, Blocks and Villages in Sankoo district
| Current district | Sub-Division | Tehsil | Blocks | Villages |
|---|---|---|---|---|
| Sankoo district | Sankoo | Gound Mangal Pore | Gound Mangal Pore | Gound Mangal Pore, Tambis |
| Sankoo district | Sankoo | TSG | Trespone | Trespone,Kanoor, Saliskote |
| Sankoo district | Sankoo | Taisuru | Taisuru | Namsuru, Gialing, Purtikchey, Youljok, Kargee, Panikhar, Printee, Choskore, Taisuru, Khawos, ThulusPursa, Khochik, Parkachik, Tangole, Achambore, Karpokhar |
| Sankoo district | Sankoo | Sankoo | Sankoo | Itcho, Faroona, Lankarchey, Stakpa, Umba, Thangdumbur, Nagmakusar, Sangrah, Barsoo, Khandi, Bartoo, Shargandi, Thasgam Thuina, Karchey Khar |
| Total | 1 | 4 | 4 | 35 |

== Demographics ==
Based on the population of the erstwhile Sankoo subdivision in the 2011 Census of India, the region corresponding to the present district had a population of 40,548 in 2011.

== Politics ==
=== Parliamentary Constituency ===
The district falls under Ladakh Lok Sabha constituency. The present Member of Parliament (MP) of Ladakh is Mohmad Haneefa (independent candidate).

=== Autonomous Hill Council ===
Sankoo District is administered by an elected body known as the Ladakh Autonomous Hill Development Council, Sankoo. The LAHDC was established in 2026.

== See also ==
- List of districts of Ladakh
- Geography of Ladakh
- Tourism in Ladakh
