= List of newspapers in Nagaland =

The following is a list of newspapers in Nagaland.

== English language ==
- Eastern Mirror (Dimapur, English)
- Mokokchung Times, (Mokokchung, English)
- The Morung Express (Dimapur, English)
- Nagaland Post (Dimapur, English)

=== Online ===
- Nagaland Tribune, (Kohima, English)

== Vernacular ==
- Capi (Kohima, Tenyidie)
- Nagamese Khobor (Nagamese)
- Sümi Zümulhü (Sümi)
- Tir Yimyim (Dimapur, Ao)
- Ao Milen (Mokokchung, Ao)

== Defunct ==
=== English ===
- Citizens' Voice (English)
- Hills Express (English)
- The Kohima Weekly (Kohima, English)
- Nagaland Express (Dimapur, English)
- Nagaland News Review (English)
- Nagaland Observer (English)
- Nagaland Page (Dimapur, English)
- Nagaland Times (English)
- Nagaland Today (English)
- The Naga Nation (English)
- Platform (English)
- Ura Mail (Dimapur, English)

=== Vernacular ===
- Ketho mu Kevi (Kohima, Tenyidie)
- Kewhira Dielie (Kohima, Tenyidie)
- Ralha (Kohima, Tenyidie)

== See also ==
- List of newspapers
