= Pushpa Girimaji =

Indian journalist

Pushpa Girimaji is an Indian author, journalist, consumer rights columnist and consumer safety advocate. She is the only Indian journalist to have written a weekly consumer column continuously for over three decades.

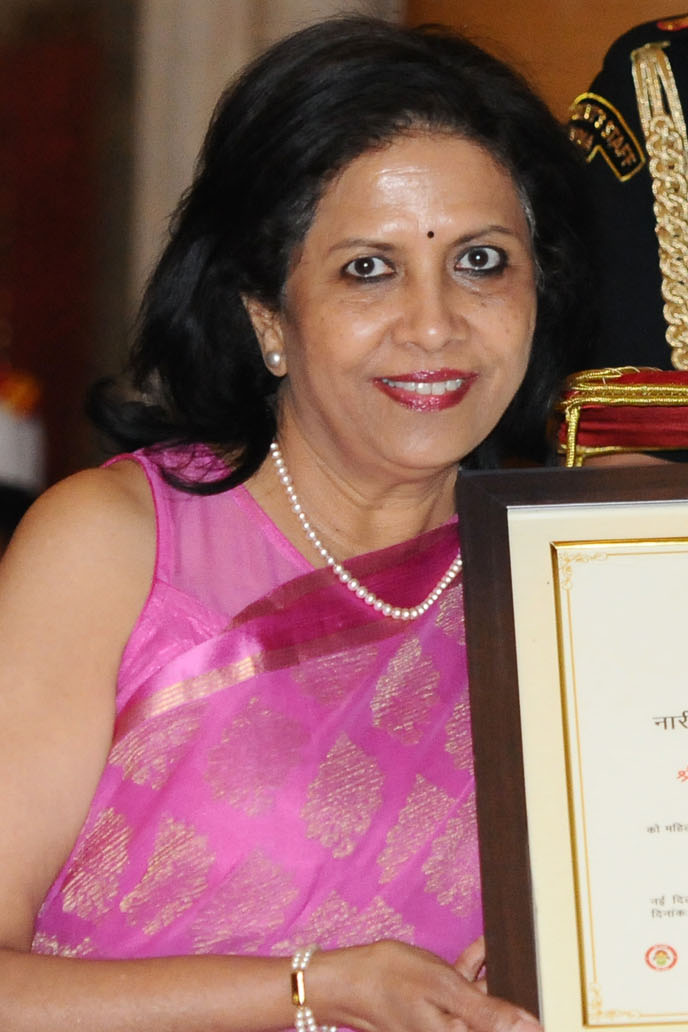
Pushpa Girimaji, accepting Nari Shakti Puraskar from the president Ram Nath Kovind (2017)

== Career ==
Girimaji began her career in Journalism in 1976 with City Tab, a community paper published from Bangalore. After City Tab, she worked for Deccan Herald in Bangalore before moving on to The Indian Express out of Delhi in 1982. In 1983, she started her consumer column and its syndication which was published in variety of papers: The Times of India, Divya Bhaskar out of Gujarat, Amar Ujala, Dainik Bhaskar, Dainik Jagran, and Samyukta Karnataka and Vijaya Karnataka, both from Kannada.

She was a member of the first advisory committee of the Insurance Regulatory and Development Authority (IRDA) from 2000 to 2003 and was involved fully in the drafting of a number of regulations, particularly the regulation on the protection of policy holders interests. She played an important role in the Consumer Protection Act of 1986 and in the numerous amendments to the law.

In recognition of her work in the area of consumer safety, the Underwriters Laboratory, USA, has made her a member of its Consumer Advisory council.

She has also been the recipient of numerous awards for her professional work, including the Karnataka Rajyotsava Award, The Sanskriti Award, M.R, Pai Award and the Chamelidevi Jain Award.

Currently, she writes two exclusive columns every week - one for the Hindustan Times and the other for The Tribune.

== Committee involvement ==
- Committee constituted by the Union ministry of consumer affairs to review/amend the Consumer Protection Act
- Inter-ministerial Committee constituted by the Union Ministry of Consumer Affairs on Misleading Advertisements.
- Empowered Committee, Union Ministry of Consumer Affairs.
- Consumer Advisory Council, Underwriters Laboratories, United States.
- Committee constituted by the Union Ministry of Consumer Affairs to draft the Consumer Protection Policy.
- Former member: First Advisory Committee, Insurance Regulatory and Development Authority of India (IRDA) 2000–2003.
- Former member: Executive Committee of the Bureau of Indian Standards (BIS) 1998–2003

== Awards ==
- M.R.Pai Memorial award for pioneering journalistic work in the area of consumer protection, July 2005.
- Karnataka State Government Award (Karnataka Rajyotsava Award) in 2001 for public service through journalism’.
- Chameli Devi Jain Award for Outstanding Women Mediaperson in 1991 for "Journalistic work dedicated to the cause of consumer awareness and protection".
- Media India Award in 1991 for "consistent writing on consumer issues"
- American Society of Newspaper Editors Fellowship in 1988, for the work in the area of consumer rights.
- Sanskriti Award in 1985 for "Notable contribution in the field of Journalism"

== Bibliography ==
- Consumer Rights for Everyone, Volume 1 (1999), ISBN 9780140265323
- Misleading advertisements and the Consumer, a monograph on the ineffectiveness of various laws meant to curb false and misleading advertisements

== Literary contributions ==
- "What ails consumer redressal mechanism?" in Emerging perspectives in consumer welfare
- "A Consuming Cause" in Making News, Breaking News, Her own Way, a collection of articles by the winners of The Chameli Devi Jain Award
