= Kalpana Sharma =

Indian journalist and writer

- Born: 1949 (age 76–77)
- Years active: 1972–present
- Employer(s): The Indian Express, The Times of India, and The Hindu
- Known for: Journalist, editor, and writer
- Awards: 1987 – Chameli Devi Jain Award for Outstanding Women Mediapersons

Kalpana Sharma (born 1947) is an Indian journalist, editor, and writer. Currently freelance, she has worked with several Indian dailies, including The Indian Express, The Times of India, and The Hindu, where she was a deputy editor and chief of the Mumbai bureau. In 1987, she received the Chameli Devi Jain Award for Outstanding Women Mediapersons. She has written and edited several books of reportage from India, including Rediscovering Dharavi (2000), which consists of reporting about Dharavi, a large slum in the city of Mumbai, India, and The silence and the storm: narratives of violence against women in India (Aleph 2019).

== Career ==
Sharma began her career in print journalism in 1972, working with Himmat Weekly, a local publication in Mumbai, where she was editor during the Emergency, and faced censorship of their content by governmental authorities. She went on to work at the Indian Express as the editor of their Sunday supplement, Express Magazine, and at The Times of India, where she was a senior assistant editor. She later worked for The Hindu, where, in addition to reporting, she was Deputy Editor, and Chief of their Mumbai bureau. Currently working independently, her journalism has focused on environmental, developmental and gender issues. She has also been a consulting editor for Economic and Political Weekly, a peer-reviewed social sciences journal in India. In 2018, she became a readers' editor at Scroll.in, a news and reporting website from India, where she took on responsibility for responding to readers' concerns and complaints, replacing C Rammanohar Reddy. She has written a column reporting on gender issues in India titled The Other Half, which was published by The Indian Express from 1985 onwards, and later in The Hindu, until 2016.

Sharma won the Chameli Devi Jain Award for Outstanding Women Mediapersons, a journalism award, in 1987. She has been a visiting faculty member at the UC Berkeley Graduate School of Journalism.

As an author, Sharma published Rediscovering Dharavi: Stories from Asia’s Largest Slum (Penguin, 2000), which consisted of reporting about Dharavi, a large slum in Mumbai, India. In 2019, she edited a volume of personal essays of notable women in India who had chosen not to marry, titled Single by Choice (Women Unlimited). It included essays by the author, Bama; sports journalist Sharda Ugra, social worker and designer Laila Tyabji, journalist Freny Maneckshaw, sociologist Sujata Patel, and others.

== Personal life ==
Sharma was born in 1947, and lives in Mumbai, India.

== Bibliography ==
- Kalpana Sharma, Missing Half the Story: Journalism as if Women Mattered (Zubaan Books, 2010) ISBN 9788189884833
- Kalpana Sharma, The silence and the storm : narratives of violence against women in India (Aleph Book Company, 2019) ISBN 9788194233718
- Kalpana Sharma (editor), Single By Choice (Women Unlimited, 2019) ISBN 978-93-85606-22-9
- Kalpana Sharma, Rediscovering Dharavi (Penguin India, 2000) ISBN 9780141000237
- Kalpana Sharma and Ammu Joseph (editors), Whose News? The Media and Women's Issues (Sage Publications, 2006) ISBN 9780761934936
