= Monalisa Changkija =

Indian journalist and poet (born 1960)

- Born: Tiamerenla Monalisa Changkija; 2 March 1960 (age 66); Jorhat, Assam, India
- Education: Hindu College, Delhi
- Occupations: Journalist; poet
- Spouse: Bendangtoshi Longkumer

Tiamerenla Monalisa Changkija is an Indian journalist and poet from Nagaland. She was the owner of Nagaland Page, a Nagaland daily newspaper that was published from May 1999 to December 2024. Changkija was a member of the Working Group on Women's Empowerment in the Indian National Planning Commission.

== Early life ==
Tiamerenla Monalisa Changkija was born in Jorhat, Assam on 2 March 1960. Her family belongs to the Ao Naga community. She attended school in Jorhat and Kohima, Nagaland. She obtained an undergraduate degree in Political Science from Hindu College, Delhi, followed by a master's degree from Delhi University.

Changkija married Bendangtoshi Longkumer, who was attached to the Department of Industries & Commerce, Government of Nagaland. They have two daughters. Longkumer died in 2017 at the age of 57.

== Career ==
Changkija began her career as a journalist with the Nagaland Times in 1985. She wrote a column, "The State of Affairs", for the paper, and another titled "Of Roses and Thorns" for the weekly Ura Mail. Both the papers were based in Dimapur.

During the long-running insurgency in Nagaland, Changkija began to write poetry and short stories to protest the violence, and criticise the social conditions that led to the unrest. Changkija's writings put her in grave risk from the militants. Her editor at the Ura Mail was assassinated in 1992. Her poem Not be dead was written to honour his memory.

Changkija founded the Nagaland Page in 1999. Focussing on issues affecting the state of Nagaland, she upset both the state government and the militants. An article published in her paper titled "State is a reality and sovereignty is a myth" led to demands from the terrorists that she disclose the author's name. When she refused, she was threatened with retribution.

In 2004, bombing at Dimapur's Hong Kong market resulted in the deaths of dozens. Changkija's impassioned Child of Cain was printed soon after.

Changkija's 2014 book Cogitating for a Better Deal was banned by the Ao Senden, an organisation that claimed to be a statutory apex judiciary body. They accused her of making false allegations against it. In particular, they objected to her statement that it was a non-governmental organisation rather than a mandated arbitrator in Ao tribal affairs.

== Selected works ==
=== Poetry ===
- Weapons of Words on Pages of Pain, 1993. ISBN 9789380500508
- Monsoon Mourning. Dimapur: Heritage Publishing House. 2013.

=== Non-fiction ===
- Cogitating for a Better Deal, 2014. ISBN 9789380500614

== Awards ==
- Chameli Devi Jain Award for Outstanding Woman Mediaperson (2009)
- 30th FICCI Women Achiever of the Year 2013-2014 for Outstanding Contributions as a Journalist (2014)

== Sources ==
- Bhaumik, Subir (21 November 2014). "Naga editor's book banned by tribal body". The Hoot.
- "FICCI award for women achievers". Nagaland Post. 30 April 2014.
- Raimedhi, Indrani (2014). "The Only Man: Monalisa Changkija". My Half of the Sky: 12 Life Stories of Courage. SAGE Publishing India. ISBN 978-93-5150-474-0.
- Pisharoty, Sangeetha Barooah (31 August 2013). "Nagaland's fiery female voice". The Hindu.
- "Shoma, Monalisa to share Chameli Devi award". The Hindu. 11 March 2010. Archived from the original on 29 June 2018.
