= Ladakh district =

Ladakh district was a former district of the Indian-administered state of Jammu and Kashmir. Earlier, it consisted of Leh and Kargil tehsils of the Ladakh Wazarat of the former princely state of Jammu and Kashmir which came under Indian control after the First Kashmir War. On 1 July 1979, it was bifurcated into Leh district and Kargil district. The two districts together constituted the Ladakh division of Jammu and Kashmir. Following the reorganisation of the state on 31 October 2019, Ladakh was separated from Jammu and Kashmir and became the Union Territory of Ladakh.

== See also ==
- List of districts of Ladakh
