= Arfa Khanum Sherwani =

Indian journalist

- Born: 24 August 1980 (age 46); Bulandshahr, Uttar Pradesh, India
- Education: Chaudhary Charan Singh University; Aligarh Muslim University; Jamia Millia Islamia
- Occupations: Journalist, News Anchor
- Years active: 2000–2025
- Awards: Red Ink Award; Chameli Devi Jain Award for Outstanding Women Mediapersons

Arfa Khanum Sherwani (born 24 August 1980) is an Indian journalist and the senior editor of The Wire. She is an alumna of Chaudhary Charan Singh University, Aligarh Muslim University and Jamia Millia Islamia. She has received the Red Ink Award and the Chameli Devi Jain Award.

== Biography and Career ==
Arfa Khanum Sherwani was born on 24 August 1980 in Bulandshahr, Uttar Pradesh. She completed her intermediate studies in the city and obtained a B.Sc. degree from the Chaudhary Charan Singh University in Meerut. She received a diploma in journalism from the Aligarh Muslim University and completed her doctoral studies at Jamia Millia Islamia, researching on Muslim and Dalit community in India.

Arfa started her career in journalism in 2000. She joined The Pioneer as an intern and later worked with The Asian Age and then Sahara TV. She joined NDTV as a principal correspondent and news anchor. She worked with Rajya Sabha TV until 2017 and is a senior editor of The Wire. She attended Stanford University in 2024-25 as a Knight Journalism Fellow.

== Political controversy ==
In 2020, a 42-second clip was cut from a speech Sherwani delivered at the Aligarh Muslim University over Citizenship (Amendment) Act, 2019 with the intent to misrepresent her views. While talking to the Committee to Protect Journalists, she stated that she has received death and rape threats on Facebook, Instagram and Twitter. BJP had claimed that the journalist was promoting the establishment of an Islamic society and urging protesters to maintain a pretence of support to non-Muslims until such a society is created. However, Sherwani maintains she actually meant the opposite.

Sherwani claims she was a victim of online abuse through the Bulli Bai app, which allegedly listed several prominent Muslim women on a mock auction.

On 31 Jan 2024, Speaking at the International Religious Freedom Summit (IRF Summit), she said,

Hindu majoritarianism in India and I think since the assassination of Mahatma Gandhi in 1948 we have now the greatest threat to secularism and religious freedom in India.

== Awards ==
- Chameli Devi Jain Award for Outstanding Women Mediapersons, 2019.
- Sahitya Samman, 2018
- Red Ink Award in Politics (TV) category, 2019
- Kuldip Nayar Patrakarita Samman, 2022
- Chhatrapati Samman Award, 2023
