= Jammu and Kashmir Reorganisation (Amendment) Bill, 2021 =

Act of Parliament

Jammu and Kashmir Reorganisation (Amendment) Act, 2021

Parliament of India
- Long title: An Act to replace an ordinance to merge the Jammu and Kashmir (J&K) cadre of civil services officers with the Arunachal Pradesh, Goa, Mizoram Union Territory (AGMUT) cadre.
- Considered by: Parliament of India
- Enacted by: Rajya Sabha
- Enacted: February 7, 2021
- Enacted by: Lok Sabha
- Enacted: February 13, 2021
- Assented to: February 17, 2021
- Signed by: Ram Nath Kovind India
- Signed: February 23, 2021
- Status: In force

Jammu and Kashmir Reorganisation (Amendment) Act, 2021 is a bill to replace an ordinance to merge the Jammu and Kashmir (J&K) cadre of civil services officers with the Arunachal Pradesh, Goa, Mizoram Union Territory (AGMUT) cadre.

== About ==
Introducing the bill, the Minister of State for Home Affairs G Kishan Reddy said the government was working to take Jammu and Kashmir on the path to development. This bill was passed in Lok Sabha today. As per the Statement of objects and reasons annexed to the Bill, "There is a huge deficiency of the officers of All India Services in the Union Territory of Jammu and Kashmir. The developmental schemes, centrally sponsored schemes and other allied activities suffer due to non-availability of All India Officers in the existing cadres of the Jammu and Kashmir as such there is a requirement of merging it with Arunachal Pradesh, Goa, Mizoram, Union territories cadre so that the officers in this cadre can be posted in the Union territory of Jammu and Kashmir to meet out any deficiency to some extent."

== Opposition ==
Many political parties opposed the bill. Speaking against the bill, Hasnain Masoodi (of the Jammu and Kashmir National Conference) said this bill is akin to an assault on the people of Jammu and Kashmir. "You are continuously increasing confusion...What is the objective of this bill? ...You are taking Jammu and Kashmir towards uncertainty through this bill," he said, adding appointed officers should have connect with the ground realities.
