= LAHDC, Sankoo =

Autonomous administrative division in Ladakh, India

Ladakh Autonomous Hill Development Council, Sankoo

Type
- Type: Autonomous District Council of the Sankoo district
- Seats: 13 Councillors

Elections
- Voting system: 13 plurality voting
- Last election: New
- Next election: 4 December 2026

Meeting place
- Sankoo, Ladakh

Ladakh Autonomous Hill Development Council, Sankoo (LAHDC Sankoo), is an Autonomous District Council in Ladakh. LAHDC Sankoo administers the Sankoo district of Ladakh, India.

== History ==
It is created in 2026 through the expansion of LAHDC across all districts in Ladakh.
