= Sevanti Ninan =

Indian journalist, columnist, researcher and media critic

- Education: CASI fellowship
- Employer: The Telegraph
- Known for: Journalist
- Awards: 1982- Chameli Devi Jain Award for Outstanding Women Mediapersons

Sevanti Ninan is an Indian journalist, columnist, researcher and media critic. She is the founding editor of The Hoot, which was the first media watchdog in India. Ninan was the recipient of the Chameli Devi Jain Award for Outstanding Women Mediapersons in 1989, and is a visiting scholar (fellowship) at the Center for the Advanced Study of India, an academic center associated with the University of Pennsylvania.

== Biography ==
Nivan began her career in journalism at the Hindustan Times and subsequently became a correspondent and later an editor with The Indian Express. She is also the author of the book, Headlines from the Heartland which is described as the first in-depth study into the growth of the expanding Hindi language newspaper industry in India.

In 2001, she founded The Hoot as a media watchdog which was re-configured into an archive and media research resource around 2018. Ninan is a regular columnist at The Telegraph and has formerly been a columnist at several major newspapers including The Hindu, The Indian Express and Mint, the financial newspaper founded by The Wall Street Journal and Hindustan Times.

== Bibliography ==
- Rajasthan (1980) Roli Books. ISBN 978-1-87-046143-6.
- Through the Magic Window: Television and Change in India (1995) Penguin Books. ISBN 978-0-14-025631-4.
- Plain Speaking with Chandrababu Naidu (2000) Viking Press. ISBN 978-0-67-089244-0.
- Headlines from the Heartland: Reinventing the Hindi Public Sphere (2007) SAGE Publications. ISBN 978-93-5280-059-9.
