= Taisuru =

Taisuru in Ladakh in India

Taisuru Tai Suru
- Village
- Location of Taisuru in Ladakh, India Taisuru (India)
- Coordinates: 34°08′12″N 75°58′20″E
- Country: India
- Union territory: Ladakh
- District: Sankoo
- Tehsil: Taisuru

Population (2011)
  - Total: 589
- Time zone: UTC+5:30 (IST)

Taisuru (also spelled Tai Suru) is a high-altitude village and one of the tehsil in the Sankoo district of Ladakh, India.

== Demographics ==
According to the 2011 Census of India, Taisuru recorded a total population of 3,419 across approximately 72 households.

Demographics of Taisuru (2011 Census)
Parameter	Total	Male	Female
Population	589	307	282
Children (0–6 years)	98	56	42
Literacy Rate	72.10%	80.88%	62.92%
Scheduled Tribes	568	295	273

== See also ==
- Tourism in Ladakh
- Sankoo district
