= The Morung Express =

English-language newspaper published in Nagaland, India

- The Power of Truth

- Type: Daily newspaper
- Format: Print, online
- Owner: Aküm Longchari
- Publisher: Aküm Longchari
- Editor: Akangjungla
- Associate editor: Moalemba Jamir
- Founded: 14 September 2005; 20 years ago
- Language: English
- Headquarters: House No. 4, Duncan Bosti, Dimapur 797112, Nagaland, India
- City: Dimapur
- Country: India
- RNI: NAGENG/2005/15430
- Website: morungexpress.com
- Free online archives: epaper.morungexpress.com

The Morung Express is an English-language newspaper published in Nagaland, India. It covers Nagaland state, national, and international news, and publishes opinion pieces and reviews. It was the first print newspaper in Nagaland with an online edition. It is headquartered at Dimapur. As of August 2024, The Morung Express is the second-largest newspaper by print circulation in Nagaland.

== History ==
Founding publisher, Aküm Longchari recalls that the newspaper 'marked a transition in the journey of three comrades' representing their generational experiences and consciousness. While they met in the mid-1990s, more friends activists joined the collective and organised capacity-building workshops on peace building and human rights across Naga inhabited areas. During these workshops, participants articulated the need for a value-based independent media that voices public understanding of peace, especially to people in power. Naga people consistently spoke of their missing voices from the mediascape. These deliberations culminated into The Morung Express in 2005 with the collective named as 'The Morung for Indigenous Affairs and JustPeace.' It rose from the particular historical realities of the Naga people.

On 1 November 2017, Moalemba (Moa) Jamir took over the editorship of the newspaper. Jamir holds a PhD from the Centre for European Studies at School of International Studies, Jawaharlal Nehru University.

== Organisation ==
To provide space for Naga people's historical realities and challenge the state narrative in news media, founding editor Along Longkumer explains, 'a great deal of innovation was required' at the organisational level as well as content management. Over the years, different models of functioning were experimented create a newspaper that caters to these historical realities and social requirements.

As for 2024, it is the only newspaper in the state to be run by a board headed by Aküm Longchari. Led by an editor, the editorial team consists of reporters, correspondents, interns, stringers, sub-editors, and associate editors. At the newspaper, this team works independently without the main editor overseeing every detail. Many work with the organisation during evenings and night, while having another day jobs. The newspaper has had a number of women reporting, editing, and designing the broadsheet. It follows the Majithia Wage Board regulations for news media as a small-sized newspaper based on its circulation.

An administrative, marketing, and management team handles the newspaper's advertising, newsprint, circulation, distribution, marketing, and finances. In addition to Dimapur, it has a news and advertising office in Kohima. As of 2023, the newspaper employed about 50 workers. In 2024 it opened a new office in Tuensang.

== Content ==
The Morung Express is an independent English language newspaper which provides an alternative voice to the dominant status quo. Based in Nagaland, India, The Morung Express was conceived from the Naga people’s historical realities and is guided by their voices and experiences. It emerged from the well-recognized concept that the core of a free press is based on “qualitative and investigative” journalism. Ensuring this is essential for contributing to a Naga public that makes informed decisions on issues that affect all spheres of life.

== Style and design ==
Having changed size, form, and editorial teams, over the years, it is now an eight-page broadsheet newspaper.

== Printing process ==
The newspaper has one edition published from Dimapur. It is printed at Themba Printers and Morung Publications located in Padam Pukhuri. This offset printing press was acquired in 2005.

== See also ==
- List of newspapers in Nagaland
