= Diktat =

Harsh decree

A diktat (from German: Diktat, [dɪkˈtaːt]) is a statute, harsh penalty or settlement imposed upon a defeated party by the victor, or a dogmatic decree. The term has acquired a pejorative sense, to describe a set of rules dictated by a foreign power or an unpopular local power. The phrases "To impose its values" or "give orders" can be synonymous with giving a diktat. An example of firman or Royal Diktat was the one issued by Mughal Emperor Farrukhsiyar in 1717, exempting the British from the payment of customs duties in Bengal.

== Origins ==
The term is from German, derived from the Latin past participle dictātum. It arose from Dictatus Papae, which attempts to resolve the struggle of the priesthood and the Empire in the Holy Roman Empire.

== Historical use ==
The term was first noted in 1922 by Wilhelm, Crown Prince of Prussia, regarding the Treaty of Versailles imposed on the defeated Germany. The treaty was referred to as such because the Allies presented it to Germany without allowing any negotiations over its terms. Other occurrences in Germany were the Treaty of Saint-Germain in 1919 and the Treaties of Tilsit in 1807, and in Czech and Slovak for the 1938 Munich Agreement and 1940 Salzburg Conference.

However, the term came into popular journalism use during the years of the Cold War where there was talk of the politburo diktats from Moscow to describe and characterize the commands by the bureaucrats of the former USSR towards its satellite countries.

It is also used in India with a very negative meaning. Police in Jharkhand have used it to describe rules enforced by local Maoists. Another use was in referring to a directive from the Drug Controller General of India’s concerning launches of new drugs.

Diktat is sometimes used in Europe to refer to directives of governments against large groups as in the case of the dispute between the European Union and Microsoft regarding license information on how Windows communicates over a network.

In the Italian press, there is a wide use of diktat to refer to events of the political sphere. The term is used to refer to either union demands against politicians, to the demands of politicians towards its allies to achieve cohesion, or to refer to imposition of rules or acts of various kinds.

The 2014 Valdai speech of Vladimir Putin articulated Russia's opposition to what he described as a Western diktat in global affairs, condemning unilateral pressure and sanctions as destabilizing forces that undermine international law and cooperation.
