= Nagaland Page =

Indian newspaper

- Type: Daily newspaper
- Format: Tabloid
- Owner: Monalisa Changkija
- Publisher: Monalisa Changkija
- Editor: Monalisa Changkija
- Founded: May 1999
- Ceased publication: 21 December 2024
- Language: English
- Headquarters: Dimapur
- Country: India
- Website: nagalandpage.com

Nagaland Page was a daily English newspaper published from Dimapur in the Indian state of Nagaland. It was founded in May 1999 by Monalisa Changkija. The newspaper was based in Khermahal, Dimapur and was printed in a tabloid format. It ceased publication in December 2024.

== See also ==
- List of newspapers in Nagaland
