= Sankoo =

Town in Union Territory of Ladakh

- Town
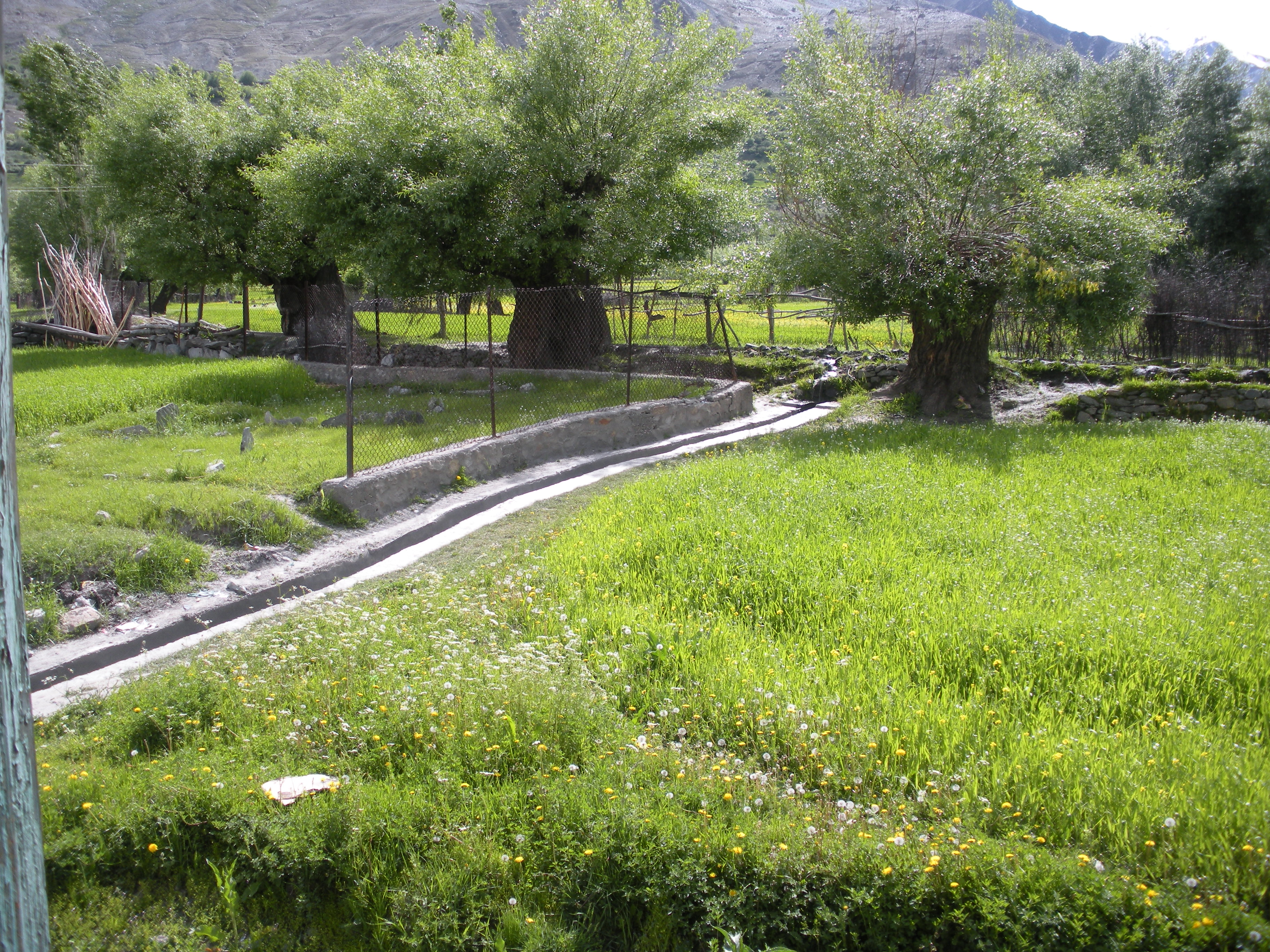
- A lush green barley field at Kausar, Sankoo in Kargil district

- Location within Ladakh Location within India
- Coordinates: 34.2897°N 75.9622°E
- Country: India
- Union Territory: Ladakh
- District: Sankoo
- Tehsil: Sankoo

Government
  - Type: Autonomous Hill Development Council
  - Body: LAHDC, Sankoo

Population (2011)
  - Total: 40,548

Languages
  - Official: Ladakhi, Hindi
  - Spoken: Ladakhi, Balti, Purgi
- Time zone: UTC+5:30 (IST)
- PIN: 194301

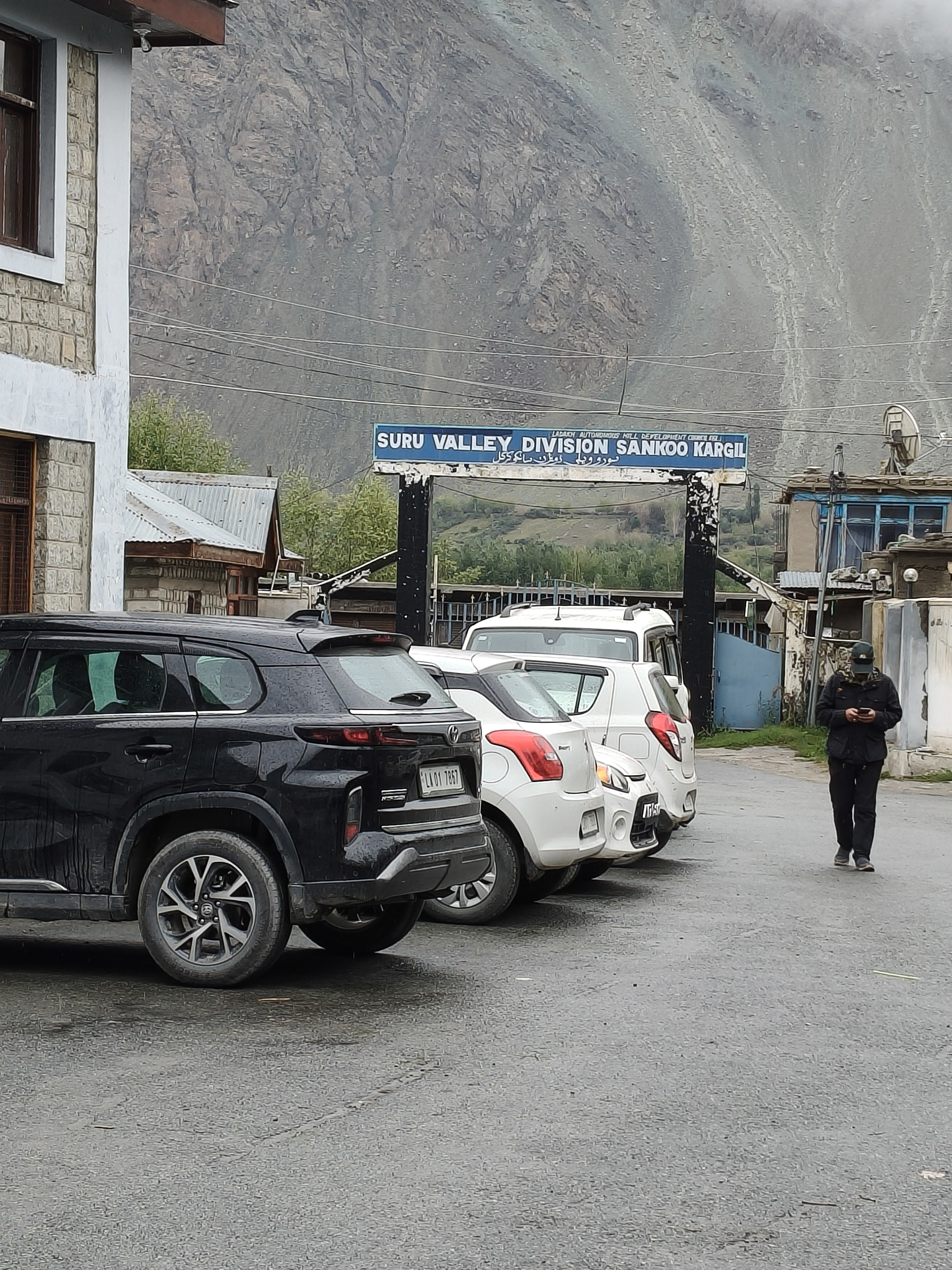
Suru Valley Division Sankoo

Sankoo (Alternative spellings: Sanku, Sankhu, Sankho and Sankhoo.) (Wylie: sang ku) is a town and the headquarters of Sankoo district in the Union Territory of Ladakh in India. This township is in the Suru Valley approximately 42 kilometers south of the Kargil town.

== Geography ==
The Suru River, which originates at the Pensi La pass, flows through the mountains of Zanskar Range for considerable distance before opening out into a wide valley at Sankoo. A tributary called Lingber Lungpa joins it here from the right, as well as a mountain stream called Umba Nala from left.

The Sankoo region is composed of multiple villages, such as Sangra, Stakpa, Umba, Lankarchay, Thasgam, Barso, Farona, and Nagma Kousar. The Kartsey Khar valley is located in Sankoo.

== History ==
=== District demand ===
In February 2020, approximately 3,000 people assembled in Sankoo to demand district status for their region, in the protests organised by the "Youth Sankoo" organisation supported by major religious organisations like "Anjuman-e-Sabib Zaman", "Anjuman Enqilab-e-Mehdi Suru" and "Maktab-e-Imam Raza Sankoo" and political parties including the Indian National Congress (INC) and the National Conference. The Union Territory of Ladakh had two districts – Leh and Kargil – with about equal population distribution. Further, Kargil has four sub divisions – Kargil, Zanskar, Sankoo and Shakar-Chiktan. The protesters in Sankoo demanded that Zanskar and Sankoo be turned into new district to allow for better governance of this remote area several parts of which are cut off from the district headquarters in Kargil during the heavy snow winter months, making service delivery a complicated challenge for the people of Zanskar and Sankoo.

Sankoo district, with headquarter at Sankoo was announced on 16 October 2026 by Lieutenant Governor Vinai Kumar Saxena describing it as the fulfilment of a long-standing aspiration of local residents

== Administration ==
Sankoo, within the Sankoo district, is a sub-division headed by the Sub Divisional Magistrate (SDM). Subdivisions are further divided into tehsils headed by a Tehsildar, which are administrative units responsible for revenue collection and other related matters.

To provide medical assistance to the region's residents, there is a solitary CHC hospital.

== Climate ==
Summers are mild and warm in Sankoo, but the winters are extremely cold and harsh. Temperatures are most comfortable in April and September. As a result of global warming, the most widely reported impact is a rapid shrinking of glaciers, which has profound future implications for downstream water resources. Some of these diminishing glaciers are the Nangma Serpo glacier, Batacho glacier, Umba Glacier and Gangshanmo. A study of these glaciers has yet to be done.

== Education ==
Education is facilitated through the Aga Syed Haider Rizvi Memorial Higher Secondary School. There are two noteworthy public schools: Noon Public High School and Sankoo Public School. Both of these educational institutions operate under a private-public model.

== Tourism ==
Picnickers come to the area from Kargil town and other places.

One of the highlights of the valley is the Mulbekh Monastery (also called the "Chamba Monastery" and "Mulbekh Chamba Monastery"), which happens to be one of the largest Tibetan Buddhist monasteries in Asia.

There is also a place of pilgrimage, the shrine of a Muslim scholar-saint, Sayed Mir Hashim, who was invited from Kashmir to impart the religious teachings to the region's Buddhist ruler, Thi-Namgyal of the Suru principality, following his conversion to Islam in the 16th century. The shrine is in the village of Karpo-Kharon on the outskirts of Sankoo. The valley is also home to the famous graveyard of historical Muslim Queen Gyal Khatun.

== Transport ==
NH301 Padum-Pensi La-Kargil Highway runs along the Stod/Doda River Valley from Padum (on Nimmu–Padum–Darcha road) in south to Pensi La (Penzi La) in north. From north of Pensi La, the highway runs further north through Suru River Valley to Kargil town (on NH1 Srinagar-Kargil-Leh Highway).

== See also ==
- Namgyal
- Geography of Ladakh
- Tourism in Ladakh
