= Battle of Turtuk =

Military engagement in the Indo-Pakistani War of 1971

- Part of the Indo-Pakistani War of 1971
Date	8–14 December 1971 (6 days)
Location	Turtuk, Northern Areas, Pakistan (present-day Ladakh, India) 34.845°N 76.828°E
Result	Indian victory
Territorial changes	India annexes 883 km^{2} (341 sq mi) of Pakistani territory, including Turtuk, Thang, Takshi and Chalunka villages and surrounding mountain peaks

Belligerents
India	Pakistan

Commanders and leaders
(India) Maj. Gen. S. P. Malhotra; (India) Col. Udai Singh; (India) Maj. Chewang Rinchen	Unknown

Units involved
Ladakh Scouts; Nubra Guards	Karakoram Scouts; Gilgit Scouts

Strength
860–1,400 personnel	500–700 personnel

Casualties and losses
Heavy	Heavy
- Location of the battle with geopolitical borders in present-day Ladakh

The Battle of Turtuk was a military engagement between India and Pakistan that took place during the Indo-Pakistani War of 1971. Fighting between the two sides took place in Turtuk and its surrounding areas, then part of the Pakistani-administered Northern Areas in Kashmir. Following this battle, Indian forces captured Turtuk from Pakistan, which had controlled the area since the Indo-Pakistani War of 1947–1948. Per the Simla Agreement, Turtuk was incorporated into the erstwhile Indian-administered state of Jammu and Kashmir, and formally became a part of Ladakh following the revocation of Article 370 by the Government of India in August 2019.

== Background ==
The village of Turtuk is situated in a strategically important location, as it lies in the immediate vicinity of the Line of Control, which separates it from Pakistani-administered Gilgit-Baltistan to its north. It is also in relatively close proximity to the Line of Actual Control in the east, which separates Indian-administered Ladakh from the Chinese-occupied territory of Aksai Chin.

The area is extremely inhospitable and the land is rugged, with deep narrow gorges and ravines. The climate is dry and cold with temperatures falling to −25 °C (−13 °F).

The Turtuk sector covers the entire Shyok river valley. In 1971, the sector came under the operational responsibility of the 3 Division of the Indian Army, based in Leh and commanded by Maj Gen S.P. Malhotra. The Indian base of operations was located in the Nubra valley, also known as Partapur sector. The sector was connected to Leh via a single lane road over the Khardung La pass, which at 17,582 ft is the highest motorable pass in the world.

== Preliminary formations ==
The Indian sector commander was Col Udai Singh who commanded a force of 5 companies of the Ladakh Scouts, of which 2 were committed to defending the Chinese border. In order to enable the 3 available companies for offensive action, 550 members of the local population were recruited and trained to form 4 companies of Nubra Guards. These were mainly tasked with static duties and for defensive duties. The 3 companies of Ladakh Scouts were supported by 2 platoons of the Nubra Guards, 2 sections of 81mm mortars and 2 sections of MMGs.

The defending Pakistani force consisted of 1 company of Karakoram Scouts and 1-2 companies of mixed Karakoram and Gilgit Scouts. These were supported by three 75-mm guns, a section of 3.7-inch howitzers and six three-inch mortars. The Pakistani positions were well prepared with the approaches mined.

== The battle ==
While approaching the LoC from the side of Diskit in Ladakh along the Indus River, the sector has the following features in the south-to-north sequence: Bogdang, Chalunka (Chulunkha), Pt 18,402 peak, Turtuk, Tyakshi, Tyakshi Pachathang, Thang - all of which are now in Indian control. As of 2025 the villages in the Pakistan-administered area are first Frano and then Thagmus.

The Indian attack was led by the Major Chewang Rinchen, who had earlier earned an MVC in the 1947 Pakistan War and a Sena Medal in the 1962 China war. On the first day, the force advanced to a place called Baigdangdo (Bogdang), driving for 40 km in jeeps and the next 40 km by foot. The next day, the unit had the option to attack the Pakistani defenses either via the steep mountainous paths or along the Shyok river. Major Chewang Rinchen decided to use the mountain paths as the approach along the Shyok river was expected to be well covered by machine gun nests as well as well mined. This would also have the benefit of taking the enemy by surprise and avoiding heavy fighting.

On 8 December, the force captured a Pakistani picquet on the top of the mountain known as Pt 18402. A platoon was also tasked to silently approach the back of Pt 18,402 and take control of the Pakistani line of communication. From the top of Pt 18402, the entire valley from Turtok and Chulunkha in the West, to the Indian headquarters at Partapur and the airfield at Thoise in the east was visible. After this, Major Chewang Rinchen's unit climbed town from Pt 18402 towards the Pakistani camp on the other side. When it reached the camp, it was found to have been abandoned and a large stock of supplies and ammunition was captured.

On 9 December, the Indian force while approaching the Pakistani base camp of Chulunkha defence complex and encountered heavy mortar and machine gun fire from multiple sides. The force was able to overcome the heavy firing and capture the Chulunkha defence complex.

The next task was to capture Turtuk on the left bank of the Shyok river. On 14 December, the force commenced the advance to take Turtuk village attack while simultaneously commencing mortar fire on the Pakistani defences to soften them up. When the mortar fire stopped and the force entered Turtuk village, it found that the Pakistani defenders had fled the previous night. Only the menfolk of the village were still present in the village while the women and children were hiding in a nullah nearby, afraid of violence and atrocities by the Indian troops. Major Rinchen was able to reassure the villagers of their safety and told them "The Indian Army will help you in all respects. Bring back your womenfolk and children. They are like our mothers and sisters. I will be responsible for their safety, if there is any misbehaviour on the part of any soldier or civilian who has come with us, I shall take disciplinary action against the person who misbehaves."

The next day, Major Rinchen and his unit proceeded to Tyakshi and Pachethang. By that time Pakistani forces had withdrawn, so the unit faced no resistance in capturing these 2 objectives.

On 17 December morning, the unit prepared to launch an attack on Prahnu and Piun, however on the same afternoon, the Pakistan government agreed to a ceasefire and the Indian forces were ordered to cease fire.

== Result ==
The battle resulted in India's capture of around 580 sq km of mostly mountains of Ladakh Range and Karakorum Range, Mountains ranging in height from 18,000 to 23,000 feet high and four small villages of Turtuk, Chalunkha, Thang, and Takshi were captured from Pakistani-administered Kashmir. The capture of Point 18402, the highest post ever captured, was a major strategic victory as from this point the entire Shyok valley stretching from Turtuk and Chulunkha in the East, to the Indian headquarters at Partapur and the airfield at Thoise in the west were visible and therefore exposed to attack and observation.

Under the Shimla Agreement, India gave back more than 13,000 km^{2} of land that the Indian Army had seized in Pakistan during the war, though India retained a few strategic mountain peaks of Pakistan controlled Kashmir (which is administered by Pakistan and claimed by India), including Turtuk, Dhothang, Tyakshi (earlier called Tiaqsi) and Chalunka of Chorbat Valley, which was more than 580 km^{2}.

== See also ==
- Yaldor Sub Sector
- India-Pakistan battles
- Indo-Pakistani wars and conflicts
