= Udai Singh (soldier) =

Indian Army officer

Brigadier Udai Singh MVC
- Born: 13 January 1929 (age 97); Rajasthan, India
- Military career
- Allegiance: India
- Branch: Indian Army
- Rank: Brigadier
- Unit: 8th Gorkha Rifles
- Conflicts: Battle of Turtuk - Indo-Pakistani War of 1971
- Awards: Maha Vir Chakra

Brigadier Udai Singh, MVC (born 13 January 1929) was an officer in the Indian Army, who served with the 8th Gorkha Rifles regiment. He was awarded the Maha Vir Chakra, India's second-highest award, for his role in the Battle of Turtuk in the Indo-Pakistani War of 1971.

== Military career ==
During the Indo-Pakistani War of 1971, Singh held the rank of colonel. He commanded a force of three companies of the Ladakh Scouts and some sections each of mortars and medium machine guns. His force was tasked with capturing the area from Chalunka to Turtuk in the Kargil sector, held by Pakistani troops. This involved moving at night in sub-zero temperatures at an altitude up to 18,000 ft (5,500 m), using only animal transport. Singh outmaneuvered the Pakistani troops and pressed home the attack against well-entrenched positions until the area was secured. He was given the India's second-highest gallantry award in recognition of his achievement and his demonstration of leadership and bravery in the field. This battle is known as the Battle of Turtuk.
