= Frano, Gilgit-Baltistan =

Frano فرانو
- Union Council
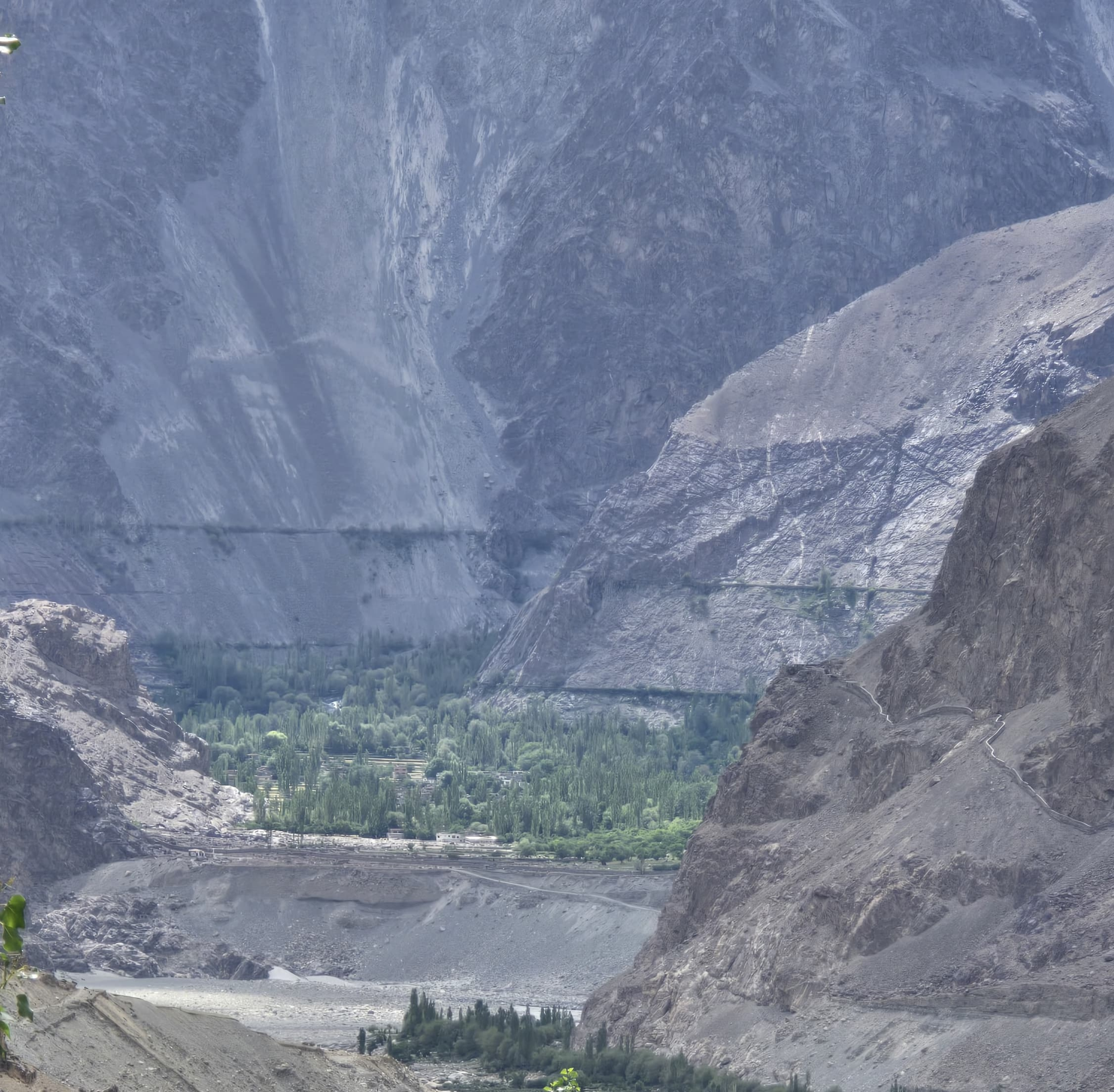
- Distant view of the Frano village as seen from Thang in the Turtuk valley.

- Location within Gilgit Baltistan Location within Pakistan
- Coordinates: 34.93448°N 76.72972°E
- Country: Pakistan
- State: Gilgit-Baltistan
- District: Ghanche
- Tehsil: Chorbat
- Elevation: 2,699 m (8,856 ft)

Population
  - Total: 400
- Time zone: UTC+5:00 (PST)

Frano or Franu (Note: Historically attested as "Pranu" or "Pranuk". Other orthographic or phonetic corruptions include "Phranu"; "Pharnu" or "Prahnu", employed particularly across the LOC.) (Urdu: فرانو, romanized: frāno) is border village and union council which lies in Chorbat Valley, in the Ghanche District, Gilgit-Baltistan. The village lies upon the banks of the north side of Shyok River, with the village of Turtuk lying on the south side of the river. It is considered as the last village of Pakistan, with the LOC, 2.5 km away, succeeding it.

Frano is also noted in travel media as one of the easternmost Pakistani villages in Baltistan and as a vantage point from which nearby Indian-administered villages across the Shyok valley can be seen.

== History ==
The village was recorded by several travellers in the mid-19th century, including by British archaeologist and explorer Alexander Cunningham during his survey of Baltistan. He described it as "one of the principal settlements in the Chorbat district, noting its extensive cultivation, fertile alluvial deposits, and surrounding orchards of apricot, walnut, and mulberry trees".

Frano

=== Attractions ===
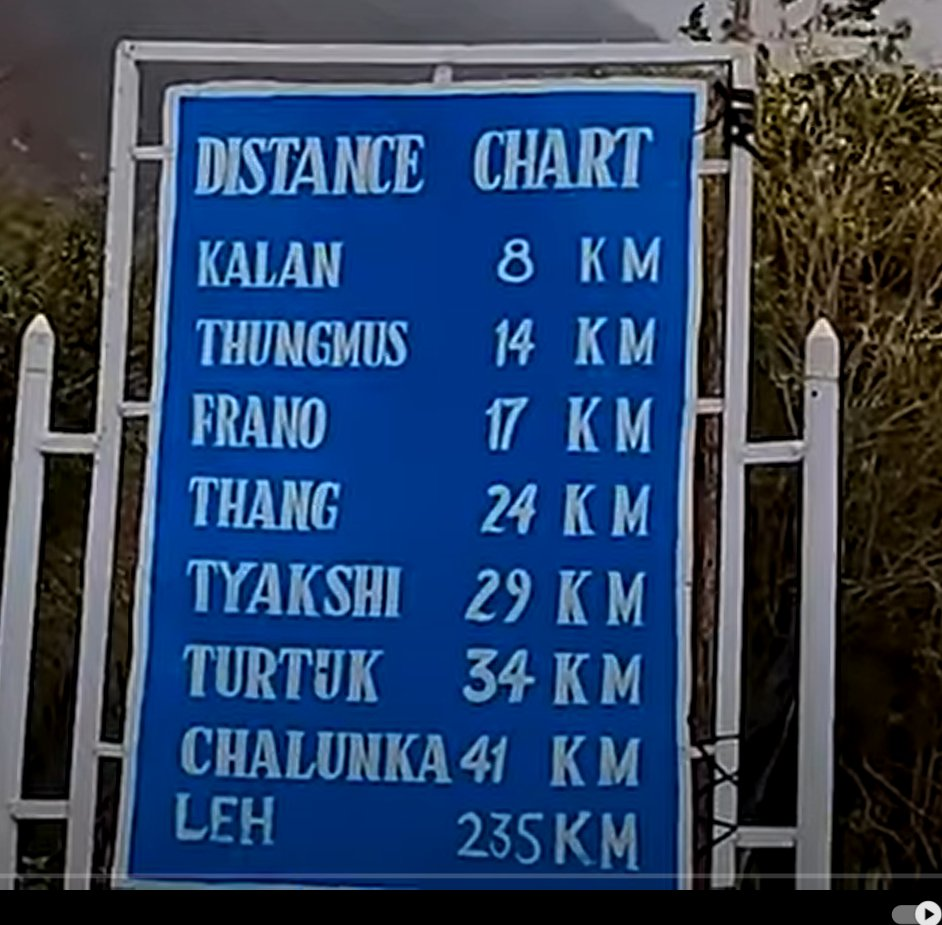
Distance chart

Frano has a notable boulder covered with ancient rock carvings. The engravings, along with inscriptions, are believed to the reminiscence of Tibetan Buddhism culture in the valley, which date back to the 13th century CE and include shapes such as circles, squares, and phallic symbols.

The Appo Ali Shah Bridge, is deemed to be the first cantilever bridge ever built in the region of Baltistan. It was built by Ali Shah, a local farmer, in 1936, with trees and local wood. Frano is also home to one of the oldest wooden Khanqahs in the region, built by Amir Kabir Sayyed Ali Hanadani, which was expanded in 2002.

=== Pak-Indo War ===
The villages of Frano in Baltistan and Thang, Ladakh were twin villages with families holding properties and homes in both sides. Following the Indo-Pakistani war of 1971, the villages were cut off from each other.

== Geography ==
Frano is one of the villages situated along the Chorbat Highway, which begins at a crossroads in Surmo, where it connects to the Siachen Highway which leads to the city of Khaplu. In the early 19th century, British explorer Godfrey Vigne mentioned the village, referring to it as "Pranuk":

We passed the castle of Chorbut, situated so as to command the entrance of the defile and pass of Hanu. Beyond the turn of the river, above the village of Pranuk, the path in its bed was not traversable, in consequence of there being too much water ... I thought it best to alter my route, and visit Nubra and Kurukurum from Ladakh. I accordingly returned, and ascended the pass of Hanu from Chorbut, having first crossed the [Shayok] river at Pranuk. At a place called Siksu we were entertained with a sword-dance.

Administratively, Frano is one of the two union councils overseing additional villages or settlements in the Shyok Valley - the other being Siksa. Settlements which come under the Frano Union Council include:

Village	Urdu Name
Marcha	مرچھا
Partuk	پرتوک
Siari	سیاری
Thongmus	تھونگموس

== Education and Health ==
The village has two publicly run primary schools and a high school. The first school was established in 1953, followed by another primary school in 1995. In 2011, a primary school for girls was also established.

Frano has a local dispensary, while the nearest hospital is located in Siksa.

== See also ==
- Thang, Ladakh
- Shyok Valley
