= Benazir Bhutto: Favored Daughter =

2016 political biography by Brooke Allen

- Author: Brooke Allen
- Language: English
- Subject: Benazir Bhutto; Politics of Pakistan
- Genre: Political biography
- Publisher: New Harvest
- Publication date: 2016
- Publication place: United States
- Media type: Print
- Pages: 176
- ISBN: 978-0-544-64893-7

Benazir Bhutto: Favored Daughter is a 2016 political biography by Brooke Allen about Pakistani politician Benazir Bhutto. Published by New Harvest as part of the Icons series, the book follows Bhutto from her privileged upbringing as the daughter of Zulfikar Ali Bhutto through her education abroad, imprisonment under General Zia-ul-Haq, two terms as Prime Minister of Pakistan, exile, and return to Pakistan in 2007.

== Synopsis ==
Allen begins with a short history of the Bhutto family and the political rise of Zulfikar Ali Bhutto, using that background to frame Benazir Bhutto's childhood and early exposure to power. The book then follows her years in the United States and Britain, including her studies at Radcliffe College and Oxford, and her appearance alongside her father at the Simla negotiations in 1972.

The biography goes on to cover Bhutto's imprisonment and political emergence during the Zia era, her leadership of the Pakistan Peoples Party from exile in London, and her return to Pakistan in 1986. It then traces her two premierships in the late 1980s and 1990s, the increasing prominence of corruption allegations involving her administration and her husband Asif Ali Zardari, and her eventual return to Pakistan in 2007 shortly before her assassination.

== Reception ==
In Kirkus Reviews, the book was described as a "sharp, perceptive" and "concise biography". The review said that, despite Allen's reliance on limited Pakistani sources, she had produced a compelling account of Bhutto's turbulent life and of Pakistan's political history.

Writing in Library Journal, Kathleen Dupre said the work was not "the definitive biography" of Bhutto, but called it "a quick, compelling read" and praised its straightforward style. Dupre also argued that the phrase "favored daughter" was used sarcastically, and that much of the book was devoted to exposing the darker side of Bhutto's personality and leadership.

Reviewing the book in Dawn, Hassan Javid called it an "eminently readable and engaging portrait" that helped explain Bhutto's appeal and contradictions. He nevertheless criticized the book for giving too little detail about the 1977 coup against Zulfikar Ali Bhutto and for not fully explaining the corruption allegations surrounding Benazir Bhutto and Zardari.
