= Simla Agreement =

1972 peace treaty between India and Pakistan

Simla or Shimla Agreement
Agreement on Bilateral Relations Between The Government of India and The Government of Pakistan
- Type: Peace treaty
- Context: Indo-Pakistani War of 1971
- Drafted: 28 June 1972
- Signed: 2 July 1972; 54 years ago
- Location: Barnes Court (Raj Bhavan), Shimla, Himachal Pradesh, India
- Sealed: 7 August 1972
- Ratified: 15 July 1972 (by Pakistan); 3 August 1972 (by India)
- Effective: 4 August 1972
- Condition: Ratification by both parties
- Negotiators: Ministry of External Affairs of India; Ministry of Foreign Affairs of Pakistan
- Signatories: Indira Gandhi (Prime Minister of India); Zulfikar Ali Bhutto (President of Pakistan)
- Parties: Republic of India; Islamic Republic of Pakistan
- Ratifiers: Parliament of India; Parliament of Pakistan
- Languages: Hindi; Urdu; English

The Simla Agreement, also spelled Shimla Agreement, is a bilateral peace treaty and framework agreement signed between India and Pakistan on 2 July 1972 in Shimla, the capital of the Indian state of Himachal Pradesh. It followed Pakistan's defeat in the India–Pakistan war of 1971, which began after India intervened in the Bangladesh Liberation War in East Pakistan on Mukti Bahini's side against Pakistan Armed Forces.

The treaty's official purpose is stated to serve as a way for both countries to "put an end to the conflict and confrontation that have hitherto marred their relations" and to conceive the steps to be taken for further normalization of India–Pakistan relations while also laying down the principles that should govern their future interactions.

The treaty gave back more than 13,000 km^{2} of land that the Indian Army had seized in Pakistan during the war, though India retained a few strategic areas, including Turtuk, Dhothang, Tyakshi (earlier called Tiaqsi) and Chalunka in the Chorbat Valley,, comprising more than 883 km^{2}.

On 23 April 2025, India suspended the Indus Waters Treaty, alleging Pakistani government connections to the 2025 Pahalgam terrorist attack. Pakistan officially condemned the attack and denied the claim of its involvement and, in-turn, suspended the Simla Agreement on 24 April 2025, as well as suspending trade with India and closing land and air routes.

== Details ==
The treaty was signed in 1972 in Simla (also spelt "Shimla" in India) by Zulfiqar Ali Bhutto, the President of Pakistan, and Indira Gandhi, the Prime Minister of India. The agreement also paved the way for diplomatic recognition of Bangladesh by Pakistan. Technically, the document was signed at 0040 hours in the night of 3 July; despite this official documents are dated 2 July 1972. Some of the major outcomes of the Simla Agreement are:

- Both countries will "settle their differences by peaceful means through bilateral negotiations". India has, many a times, maintained that Kashmir dispute is a bilateral issue and must be settled through bilateral negotiations as per Simla Agreement, 1972 and thus, had denied any third party intervention, even that of the United Nations.
- The agreement converted the cease-fire line of 17 December 1971 into the Line of Control (LOC) between India and Pakistan and it was agreed that "neither side shall seek to alter it unilaterally, irrespective of mutual differences and legal interpretations". Many Indian bureaucrats have later argued that a tacit agreement, to convert this LOC into international border, was reached during a one-on-one meeting between the two heads of government. Pakistani bureaucrats have denied any such thing. This identification of a new "cease-fire line" by both the states has been argued by India as making United Nations Military Observer Group in India and Pakistan insignificant. As according to India, the purpose of UNMOGIP was to monitor the cease-fire line as identified in Karachi agreement of 1949 which no longer exists. Pakistan has a different take on this issue and both countries still host the UN mission.

The agreement has not prevented the relationship between the two countries from deteriorating to the point of armed conflict, most recently in the Kargil War of 1999. In Operation Meghdoot of 1984 India seized all of the inhospitable Siachen Glacier region where the frontier had been clearly not defined in the agreement (possibly as the area was thought too barren to be controversial); this was considered as a violation of the Simla Agreement by Pakistan. Most of the subsequent deaths in the Siachen Conflict have been from natural disasters, e.g. avalanches in 2010, 2012, and 2016.

== Text ==
Simla Agreement on Bilateral Relations between India and Pakistan signed by Prime Minister Indira Gandhi, and President of Pakistan, Z. A. Bhutto, in Simla on 2 July 1972.

The Government of India and the Government of Pakistan are resolved that the two countries put an end to the conflict and confrontation that have hitherto marred their relations and work for the promotion of a friendly and harmonious relationship and the establishment of durable peace in the subcontinent so that both countries may henceforth devote their resources and energies to the pressing task of advancing the welfare of their people.

In order to achieve this objective, the Government of India and the Government of Pakistan have agreed as follows:

(i) That the principles and purposes of the Charter of the United Nations shall govern the relations between the two countries.

(ii) That the two countries are resolved to settle their differences by peaceful means through bilateral negotiations or by any other peaceful means mutually agreed upon between them. Pending the final settlement of any of the problems between the two countries, neither side shall unilaterally alter the situation and both shall prevent the organization, assistance or encouragement of any acts detrimental to the maintenance of peace and harmonious relations.

(iii) That the prerequisite for reconciliation, good neighborliness and durable peace between them is a commitment by both the countries to peaceful coexistence respect for each others territorial integrity and sovereignty and noninterference in each others internal affairs, on the basis of equality and mutual benefit. That the basic issues and causes of conflict which have bedeviled the relations between the two countries for the last 25 years shall be resolved by peaceful means.

(iv) That they shall always respect each others national unity, territorial integrity, political independence and sovereign equality.

(v) That in accordance with the Charter of the United Nations, they will refrain from the threat or use of force against the territorial integrity or political independence of each other.

Both governments will take all steps within their power to prevent hostile propaganda directed against each other. Both countries will encourage the dissemination of such information as would promote the development of friendly relations between them.

In order progressively to restore and normalize relations between the two countries step by step, it was agreed that:

(i) Steps shall be taken to resume communications, postal, telegraphic, sea, land, including border posts, and air links, including over flights.

(ii) Appropriate steps shall be taken to promote travel facilities for the nationals of the other country.

(iii) Trade and cooperation in economic and other agreed fields will be resumed as far as possible.

(iv) Exchange in the fields of science and culture will be promoted.

In this connection delegations from the two countries will meet from time to time to work out the necessary details.

In order to initiate the process of the establishment of durable peace, both the governments agree that:

(i) Indian and Pakistani forces shall be withdrawn to their side of the international border.

(ii) In Jammu and Kashmir, the line of control resulting from the ceasefire of 17 December 1971, shall be respected by both sides without prejudice to the recognized position of either side. Neither side shall seek to alter it unilaterally, irrespective of mutual differences and legal interpretations. Both sides further undertake to refrain from the threat or the use of force in violation of this line.

(iii) The withdrawals shall commence upon entry into force of this agreement and shall be completed within a period of 30 days thereof.

This agreement will be subject to ratification by both countries in accordance with their respective constitutional procedures, and will come into force with effect from the date on which the instruments of ratification are exchanged.

Both governments agree that their respective heads will meet again at a mutually convenient time in the future and that in the meanwhile the representatives of the two sides will meet to discuss further the modalities and arrangements for the establishment of durable peace and normalization of relations, including the questions of repatriation of prisoners of war and civilian internees, a final settlement of Jammu and Kashmir and the resumption of diplomatic relations.

Zulfiqar Ali Bhutto

Indira Gandhi

President

Prime Minister

Islamic Republic of Pakistan

Republic of India
Simla, 2 July 1972.

— Zulfiqar Ali Bhutto, Indira Gandhi.

== Delhi Agreement ==
The Delhi Agreement on the Repatriation of War and Civilian Internees is a tripartite agreement among the aforementioned states, signed on 28 August 1973. The agreement was signed by Kamal Hossain, the Foreign Minister of the Government of Bangladesh, Sardar Swaran Singh, Minister of External Affairs of India and Aziz Ahmed, the Minister of State for Defense and Foreign Affairs of the Government of Pakistan.
