= Bogdang =

Bogdang Beyoqdan
- Village
- Location in Ladakh, India Bogdang (India)
- Coordinates: 34.803409°N 77.041481°E
- Country: India
- Union Territory: Ladakh
- District: Nubra
- Tehsil: Diskit

Population (2011)
  - Total: 1,988
- Time zone: UTC+5:30 (IST)
- PIN: 194401
- Census code: 915

Bogdang (Bukdang, Beyoqdan, Biagdangdo, ) is a village located in Diskit tehsil in the Nubra district of Ladakh, India. The village is famous for its apricots and beautiful landscapes. The population is predominantly Balti-speaking and follows the Sofia Noorbakshia sect of Islam.

== Location ==
Bogdang is located in the Shyok River valley after it narrows near Yagulung, the portion sometimes called the Chorbat Valley, distinguishing it from the "Lower Nubra" (the wider Shyok Valley). During the First Kashmir War of 1947–48, the Gilgit Scouts that invaded the region were pushed beyond the village, and the cease-fire line was set at Chalunka, the next village on the Shyok River. Thus Bogdang was the northernmost village of Ladakh on the Shyok River until 1971.

In the Indo-Pakistani War of 1971, the Ladakh Scouts conquered Chalunka, Turtuk Thang Tyakshi small villages of the Chorbat Valley, making Bogdang safely in the interior of Indian-administered Kashmir.

== Demographics ==
According to the 2011 census of India, Bogdang has 272 households. The effective literacy rate (i.e. the literacy rate of population excluding children aged 6 and below) is 64.89%.

Demographics (2011 Census)
| | Total | Male | Female |
|---|---|---|---|
| Population | 1988 | 1005 | 983 |
| Children aged below 6 years | 450 | 242 | 208 |
| Scheduled caste | 0 | 0 | 0 |
| Scheduled tribe | 1975 | 998 | 977 |
| Literates | 998 | 631 | 367 |
| Workers (all) | 782 | 366 | 416 |
| Main workers (total) | 165 | 155 | 10 |
| Main workers: Cultivators | 0 | 0 | 0 |
| Main workers: Agricultural labourers | 1 | 1 | 0 |
| Main workers: Household industry workers | 2 | 2 | 0 |
| Main workers: Other | 162 | 152 | 10 |
| Marginal workers (total) | 617 | 211 | 406 |
| Marginal workers: Cultivators | 572 | 173 | 399 |
| Marginal workers: Agricultural labourers | 3 | 0 | 3 |
| Marginal workers: Household industry workers | 0 | 0 | 0 |
| Marginal workers: Others | 42 | 38 | 4 |
| Non-workers | 1206 | 639 | 567 |

== Bibliography ==
- Longstaff, T. G. (June 1910), "Glacier Exploration in the Eastern Karakoram", The Geographical Journal, 35 (6), The Royal Geographical Society: 622–653, doi:10.2307/1777235, JSTOR 1777235
