= Chewang Rinchen =

Indian Army officer (1931–1997)

Colonel Chewang Rinchen MVC, SM
- Born: 1931; Sumur, Ladakh, Jammu and Kashmir, British Raj
- Died: 1997 (aged 65–66); Leh, Ladakh, India
- Military career
- Allegiance: India
- Branch: Indian Army
- Service years: 1948–1984
- Rank: Colonel
- Units: Nubra Guards (1948–?); Ladakh Scouts (1971–1984)
- Conflicts: Indo-Pakistani War of 1947; Sino-Indian War; Indo-Pakistani War of 1971
- Awards: Maha Vir Chakra & bar Sena Medal; Mention in dispatches

Colonel Chewang Rinchen MVC & Bar, SM (Kalon Tsewang Rigdzin, 1931–1997) was a highly decorated officer in the Indian Army from the Union territory of Ladakh. He was the youngest ever recipient of the Maha Vir Chakra, the second highest Indian gallantry decoration, for his role in the defence of Ladakh in the First Kashmir War. He received the Maha Vir Chakra for a second time after Indo-Pakistani War of 1971, for his role in the conquest of the Turtuk and Tyakshi (a small village of the Chorbat. valley), in what came to be known as the Battle of Turtuk. He was one of only six Indian service personnel to have the Maha Vir Chakra twice. He was awarded a Sena Medal for gallantry in the 1962 India-China War. and Mention in dispatches for gallantry in the Indo-Pakistani War of 1965

== Early life ==
Chewang Rinchen was born in the village of Sumur in Nubra in 1931 in an illustrious family. One of his ancestors had the title of "Stak" (Lion of Ladakh) for his bravery and his mother was known as "Mother of Nubra Valley" for her compassion. Rinchen was educated in Sumur by a Ladakhi Christian missionary by name Stanzin. At age 13, he attracted the attention of a kalon (duke) of Ladakh, who took him to Leh for secondary education. Four years later, the First Kashmir War started, placing Ladakh in grave jeopardy from the raiders from Gilgit-Baltistan.

== Military career ==
Rinchen joined the Nubra Guards in 1948 at the age of 17 years. It is said that Major Prithi Chand had requested the local people of Ladakh for their support in repelling the invasion, and Chhewang was the first man to enlist in the newly formed Nubra Guards. He served in the Indo-Pakistani War of 1947 alongside Indian Army units.He later received a formal enlistment in the Indian Army as a Jemadar. He was trained by (then) Subedar Bhim Chand, VrC & bar, of Lahaul. For his role in this war, Chewang Rinchen is regarded among the 'Saviours of Ladakh', alongside Bhim Chand, Col. Thakur Prithi Chand, MVC, and Lt. Col. Kushal Chand, MVC. Fighting in the Nubra Valley, Rinchen was promoted through the ranks and was awarded a Mahavir Chakra for bravery. At 17 years of age, he was the youngest recipient of the award.

=== Maha Vir Chakra ===
The citation for the first Maha Vir Chakra awarded to him reads:

Gazette Notification: 9 Pres/52,26.1.52

Operation: 1947 Indo Pak Kashmir War Date of Award: 28 Dec 1948

CITATION

JEMADAR CHEWANG RINCHAN

7 BN, THE J&K MILITIA

In Aug 48 the enemy had thrown all his reserves to capture the NUBRA Valley. Jem CHEWANG RINCHAN with only 18 untrained nationals held the enemy at KHARU NULLAH for 23 days. In Sep 48, he was detailed to capture the enemy position at LAMA HOUSE. This was on extremely difficult task and entailed 4 days march through a treacherous country, including crossing a mountain feature over 17000 ft. He succeeded in capturing the objective, with heavy casualties to the enemy and the capture of 3 rifles.

On 15 Dec when ordered to capture a hill feature near BIAGDANGDO, he walked through snow for 3 days and succeeded in forcing the enemy to withdraw. Again on 22 Dec 48 he was detailed to attack the enemy's last position in LEH tehsil Area. It took him six days to reach his objective. He had to go over a mountain feature over 23000 ft and though his platoon suffered 50 per cent casualties from frost bite, he kept his men going through his outstanding and exemplary leadership. He attacked the enemy's two posts and captured them; the enemy suffering heavy casualties. This JCO displayed exemplary courage, inspiring leadership, initiative and the ability to plan and carry out his schemes successfully under the most adverse conditions.

=== Between wars ===
Rinchen also served in the 1962 India-China War, where he was awarded a Sena Medal. On 1 April 1964, he was granted a permanent commission in the regular Indian Army with the rank of second lieutenant (seniority from 21 August 1962), and relinquished his commission in the Jammu and Kashmir Militia. He was promoted to lieutenant on 21 August 1964.

=== Bar to Maha Vir Chakra ===
In the Indo-Pakistani War of 1971, Rinchen, now a major in the Ladakh Scouts, led the capture of the Chalunka complex of the Pakistani Army and the strategic outpost of Turtuk. For these actions, he was awarded a bar to his MVC, being one of only six Indian soldiers so honoured. This battle was known as the Battle of Turtuk.

The citation for the second Maha Vir Chakra awarded to him reads:

Gazette Notification: 22 Pres/72,12-2-72

Operation: 1971 Cactus Lily Date of Award: 08 Dec 1971

CITATION

MAJOR CHEWANG RINCHEN, MVC

THE LADAKH SCOUTS

Major Chewang Rinchen of Ladakh Scouts was commander of the force assigned the task of capturing the Chalunka complex of enemy defences in the Partappur Sector. Each of these nine enemy strong points were held by one to two platoons and fortified with mines and wire obstacles. This operation was planned and executed with professional competence and great zeal. Under most adverse weather conditions, Major Rinchen led his command, displaying aggressive spirit and cool courage, fighting from bunker to bunker, exhorting and encouraging his men to destroy the enemy, making the operation a complete success.

In this action, Major Chewang Rinchen displayed inspiring leadership, indomitable courage, initiative and exceptional devotion to duty in the highest traditions of the Indian Army.

=== Later career ===
Promoted to the substantive rank of major on 6 February 1978, Rinchen retired from active service with effect from 1 May 1980, when he transferred to the reserves. On 1 October 1983, he was re-employed and assigned to command 246 Transit Camp with the local rank of lieutenant-colonel, while serving with the Jammu and Kashmir Rifles. Rinchen finally retired as a full colonel in 1984.

== Honours and decorations ==

| Maha Vir Chakra (Bar) | | Sena Medal | |
| Parakram Padak | General Service Medal | Samanya Seva Medal | Samar Seva Star |
| Paschimi Star | Raksha Medal | Sangram Medal | Sainya Seva Medal |
| 25th Anniversary of Independence Medal | 30 Years Long Service Medal | 20 Years Long Service Medal | 9 Years Long Service Medal |

== Legacy ==
The Indian Army has named an army shopping complex after him in Leh. On 21 October 2019 Defense Minister Rajnath Singh inaugurated the Col Chewang Rinchen Setu, India's highest altitude all-weather permanent bridge, in eastern Ladakh just 45 km from border with China. The 1400-ft long bridge on Shyok River, at 14,650 ft is strategically located on the Darbuk–Shyok–DBO Road between Leh and Karakoram Pass.

== Personal life ==
Chewang Rinchen married Shema Choskit Dolma of Leh Khangsar, an aristocratic family from Leh. He had 4 siblings and one of Rinchen's younger brother P. Namgyal is a former Union Minister and Member of Parliament (Lok Sabha).
