= Nubra Guards =

Defunct Indian paramilitary

The Nubra Guards was an Indian paramilitary force formed during the Indo-Pakistani War of 1947–1948 to provide security in the Nubra Tehsil, in particular the Nubra and Shyok river valleys. Diskit, the headquarters of Nubra, is about 150 km north from Leh town, the capital of Ladakh district. The Guard was originally formed by Chewang Rinchen whose family was from the area. In April 1948 the Guard was at company strength. The Guard was re-raised several times and resisted the Pakistani invasion of Jammu and Kashmir.

In 1952, the Nubra Guards were merged into the Jammu and Kashmir Militia (which later became the Jammu and Kashmir Light Infantry) as the 7th Battalion. Both the 7th and 14th battalions JKLI were later detached to form the Ladakh Scouts.
