= Takshi =

Village in Ladakh, India

Takshi Tyakshi, Tyaqsi
- Village
- Location within Ladakh Location within India
- Coordinates: 34.8783°N 76.8159°E
- Country: India
- Union Territory: Ladakh
- District: Nubra
- Tehsil: Turtuk

Population (2011)
  - Total: 886
- Time zone: UTC+5:30 (IST)
- PIN: 194401
- 2011 census code: 912

Takshi, also known as Tyakshi or Tyaqsi, is a remote village in Nubra valley, located on the banks of the Shyok River in the Nubra district of UT Ladakh, India. It lies in the historical Chorbat Valley of the Baltistan region, which was divided between India and Pakistan by the modified ceasefire line (designated as the Line of Control) that was established in the 1972 Shimla Agreement.

Tyakshi, along with Chalunka, Turtuk and Thang, became part of the Pakistani-administered Northern Areas following the Indo-Pakistani War of 1947–1948. All four villages were captured by Indian forces during the Indo-Pakistani War of 1971, after which they were incorporated into the erstwhile Indian-administered state of Jammu and Kashmir. Following the revocation of Article 370 by the Government of India in August 2019, Tyakshi formally fell under the jurisdiction of the Indian-administered union territory of Ladakh. After 1971 war four villages Pakistan controlled Kashmir were retained by India while many Indian villages in Chhamb sector were retained by Pakistan and line of control was defined. The population of Takshi is largely Balti.

== History ==
See history of Turtuk and nearby areas.

== Demographics ==
According to the 2011 Census of India, Takshi has 112 households. The effective literacy rate (i.e. the literacy rate of population excluding children aged 6 and below) is 85.56 %.

Demographics (2011 Census)
	Total	Male	Female
Population	886	452	434
Children aged below 6 years	169	96	73
Scheduled caste	0	0	0
Scheduled tribe	876	444	432
Literates	467	283	184
Workers (all)	371	178	193
Main workers (total)	297	157	140
Main workers: Cultivators	193	75	118
Main workers: Agricultural labourers	1	1	0
Main workers: Household industry workers	0	0	0
Main workers: Other	103	81	22
Marginal workers (total)	74	21	53
Marginal workers: Cultivators	61	16	45
Marginal workers: Agricultural labourers	0	0	0
Marginal workers: Household industry workers	1	0	1
Marginal workers: Others	12	5	7
Non-workers	515	274	241
