= Chalunka =

Chalunka Chulungkha
- Village
- Location in Ladakh Chalunka (India)
- Coordinates: 34.824°N 76.935°E
- Country: India
- Union territory: Ladakh
- District: Nubra
- Tehsil: Turtuk

Population (2011)
  - Total: 516
- Time zone: UTC+5:30 (IST)
- Census code: 914

Chorbat

Chalunka (also known as Chalunkha or Chulungkha) is a small mountainous village, in Turtuk tehsil and Turtuk community development block, in Chorbat area of Shyok River valley in Ladakh, India. At the end of the Indo-Pakistani War of 1947, it was on the cease-fire line agreed between the India and Pakistan. After the Indo-Pakistani War of 1971, the village came under the jurisdiction of Indian-administered Jammu & Kashmir.

== History ==
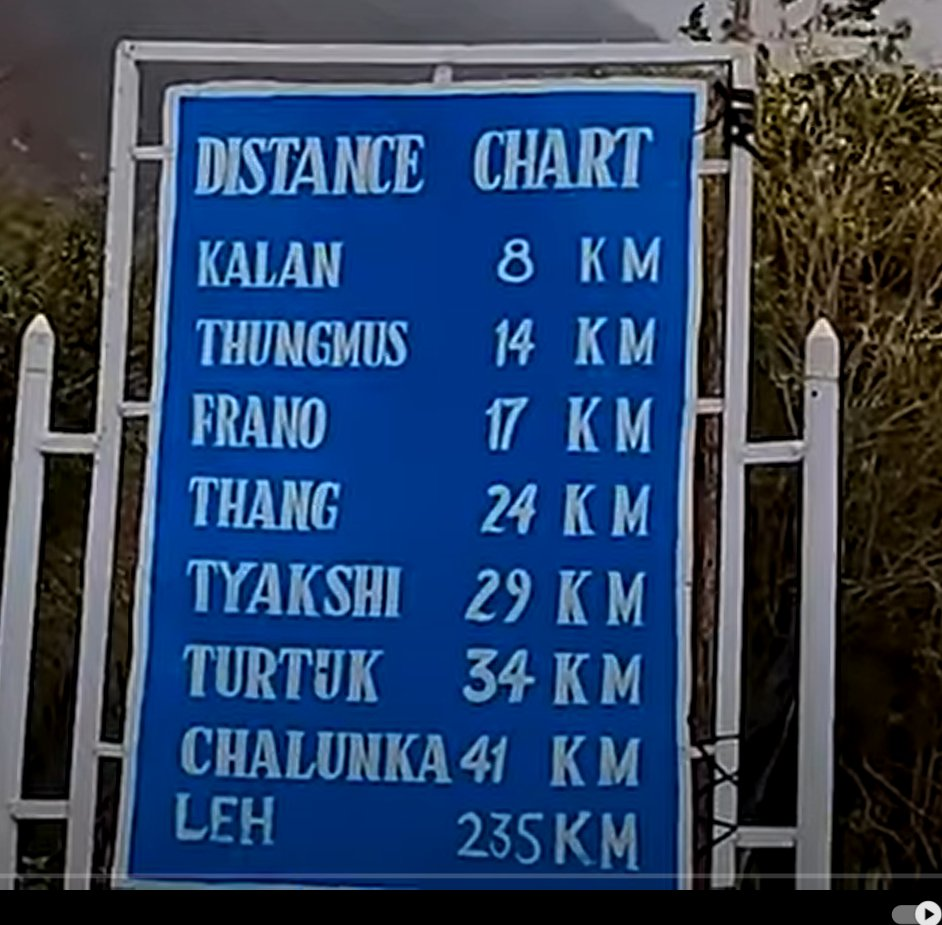
distance chart

Chalunka, along with Tyakshi, Turtuk and Thang, became part of the Pakistani-administered Northern Areas following the Indo-Pakistani War of 1947–1948.

During the Indo-Pakistani War of 1971, on 10 December 1971, the Ladakh Scouts under the command of Major Chewang Rinchen cleared the village of the Pakistani forces (two companies of Karakoram Scouts). Advancing further, they attacked Turtuk on 11 December, and captured it by 14 December.

After the Simla Agreement of 1972, they were incorporated into the Indian state of Jammu and Kashmir. Following the reorganisation of the state in August 2019, these villages became part of the union territory of Ladakh.

== Demographics ==
According to the 2011 census of India, Chulungkha has 42 households. The effective literacy rate (i.e. the literacy rate of population excluding children aged 6 and below) is 91.1%.

Demographics (2011 Census)
	Total	Male	Female
Population	516	403	113
Children aged below 6 years	44	22	22
Scheduled caste	53	53	0
Scheduled tribe	223	110	113
Literates	430	372	58
Workers (all)	362	348	14
Main workers (total)	353	342	11
Main workers: Cultivators	36	27	9
Main workers: Agricultural labourers	1	1	0
Main workers: Household industry workers	0	0	0
Main workers: Other	316	314	2
Marginal workers (total)	9	6	3
Marginal workers: Cultivators	2	1	1
Marginal workers: Agricultural labourers	3	1	2
Marginal workers: Household industry workers	0	0	0
Marginal workers: Others	4	4	0
Non-workers	154	55	99
