= Turtuk =

Village in Ladakh, India

- Village and Tehsil
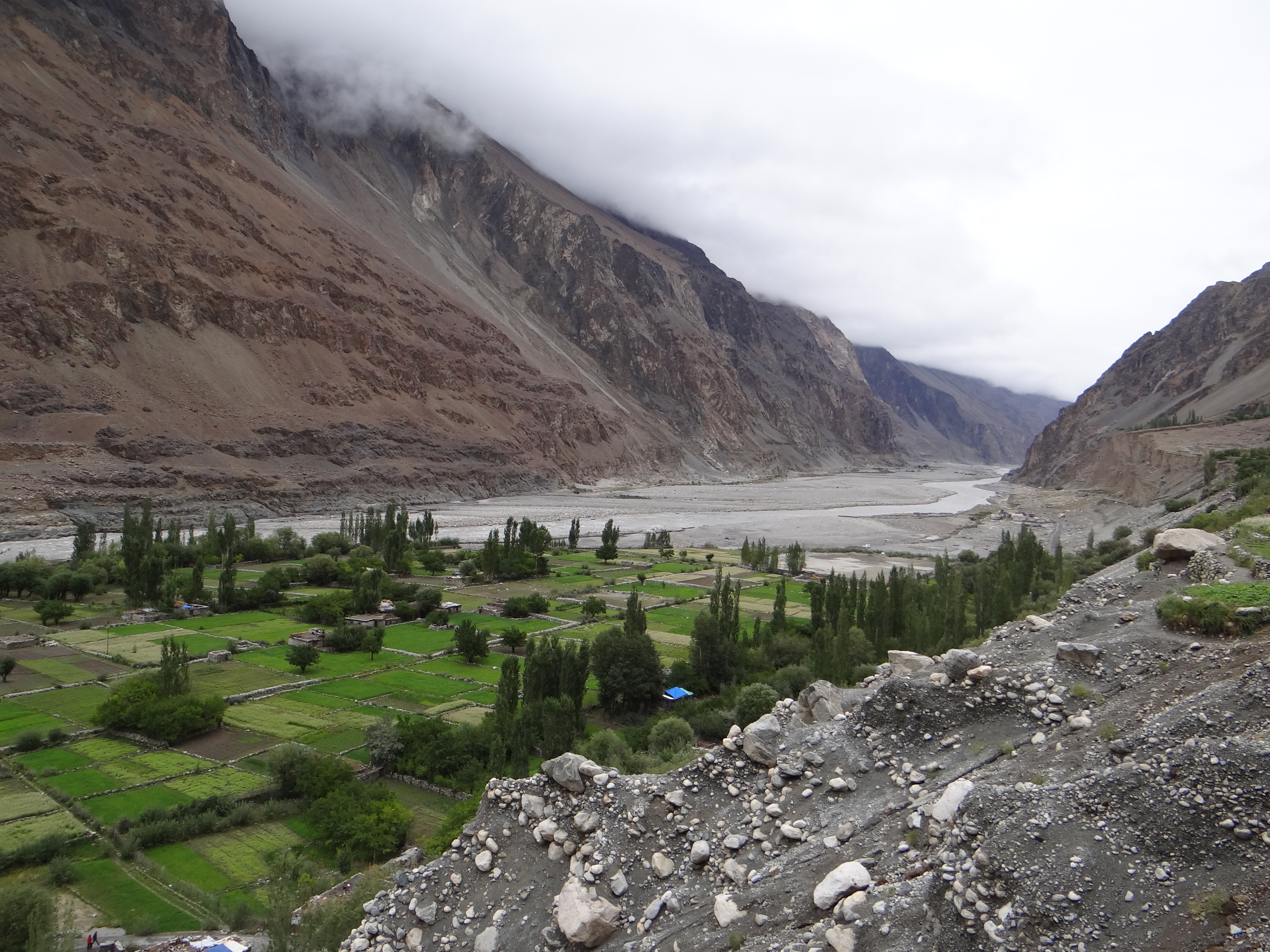
- Shyok river at Turtuk in Nubra district, Ladakh

- Location within Ladakh Location within India
- Coordinates: 34.847°N 76.827°E
- Country: India
- Union Territory: Ladakh
- District: Nubra
- Tehsil: Turtuk

Government
  - Type: Panchayati raj
  - Body: Gram panchayat

Population (2011)
  - Total: 3,371

Languages
  - Official: Ladakhi, Hindi, Balti
- Time zone: UTC+5:30 (IST)
- PIN: 194401
- Census code: 913

Turtuk is a town, the headquarters of the eponymous tehsil and community development block in the Nubra district of Indian union territory of Ladakh. Situated on the banks of the Shyok River, sandwiched between the Karakorum Range and the Himalayas, and one of the northernmost habitations of India, close to the Line of Control between India and Pakistan. Geographically, the village is in the Baltistan region, which has been under Pakistani administration, except for five villages of the Turtuk block which are part of India. These villages form the only region in India populated by Balti people. Turtuk is known for its fruit, especially apricots.

Turtuk was administered by Pakistan and was under Pakistani control until the war of 1971, when the Indian Army captured the area. It is also one of the gateways to the Siachen Glacier.

== History ==
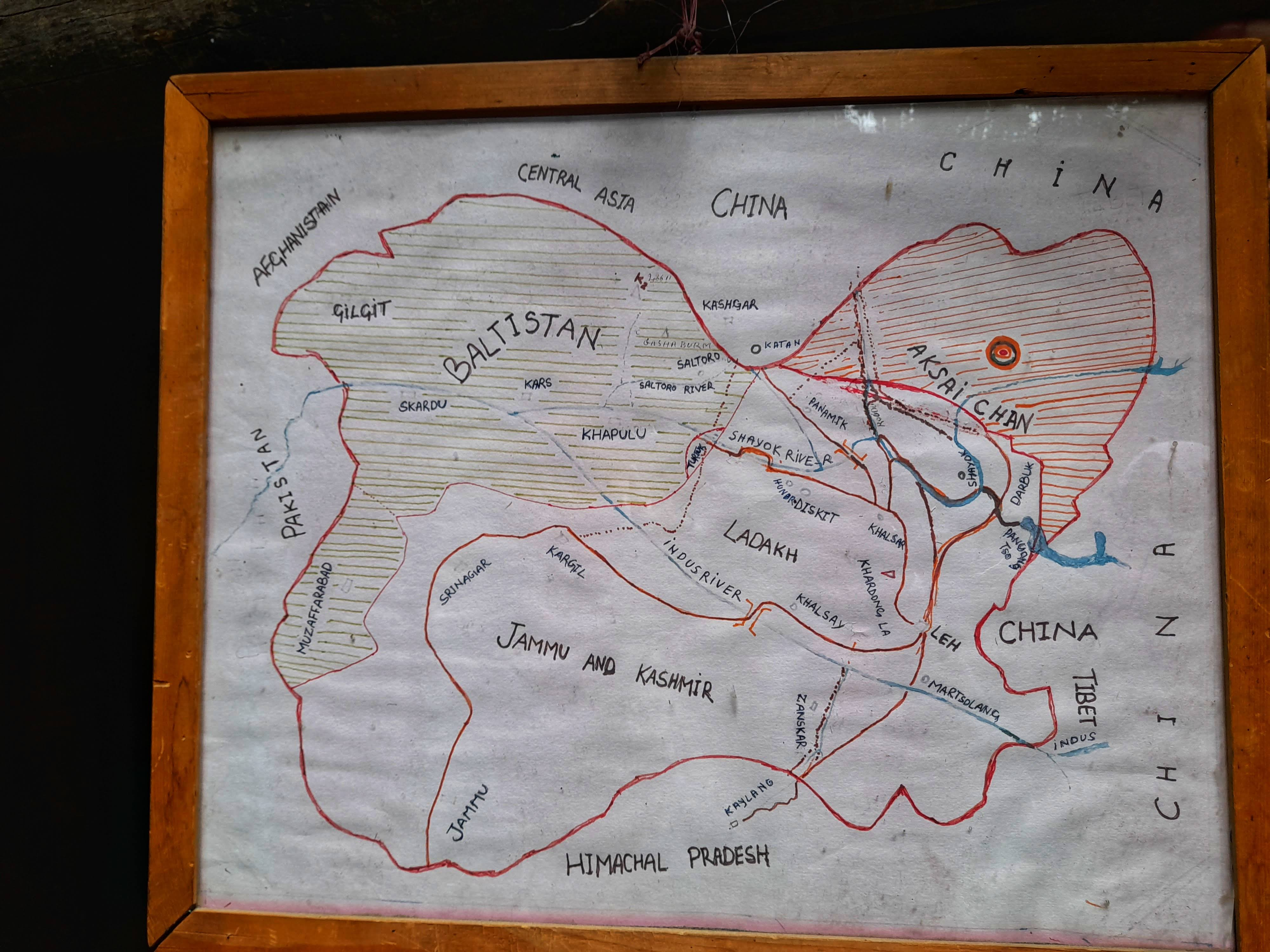
Hand-drawn map of Turtuk from the Turtuk Palace.

=== Brogpa era ===
The earliest known tribe which inhabited Turtuk were a Dardic tribe, locally known as the Brogpas, who are believed to have migrated from Chilas, a place now in Pakistan. They lived in Turtuk from an unknown time till, mostly probably, the 13th century AD. At some point around the 13th century AD, two warriors named Chuli and Yangdrung, came to Turtuk. They killed the king and eventually most of the locals fled Turtuk along the stream and across the mountain, to the villages now called Hanu, Dah and Domkhar. Today, a majority of the population in Turtuk are the direct descendants of Chuli and Yangdrung. As time passed, people immigrated to Turtuk in search of livelihood, bringing in diversity. Turtuk is believed to have remained an independent principality till the conquest of Baltistan by the Sikh Empire.

The people of Turtuk were followers of the Bon religion before Islam. Bon rituals can be seen both in the tradition as well as the architecture. Islam came to Turtuk due to the famous Persian Sufi poet and preacher, Syed Ali Shah Hamdani. People in Turtuk, like in other places of Baltistan, practice the Sufi sect Sufis Noorbakshia, named after a disciple of Shah Hamdani, Syed Mohammad Noorbaksh. By the nineteenth century, dominant sects from outside, such as Shia, Hanafi and later Wahabi, started converting the Sufi Noorbakshia of Baltistan, and the Noorbakshia of Turtuk. More recently, the Hanafis of Turtuk have also been converted to the more extreme subsets of Sunni. At present, only half of the population practices Noorbakshias while the rest practice either Sunni or Wahhabi Islam.

=== Dogra dynasty ===
Raja Gulab Singh of Jammu, a vassal of the Sikh Empire, conquered the region in 1840, ending the Balti kingdom of Maqpon dynasty.

After the First Anglo-Sikh War, the British established the princely state of Jammu and Kashmir under Gulab Singh. Singh's Dogra dynasty ruled the region until 1947 under the suzerainty of British Raj.

=== Indo-Pakistan conflicts ===
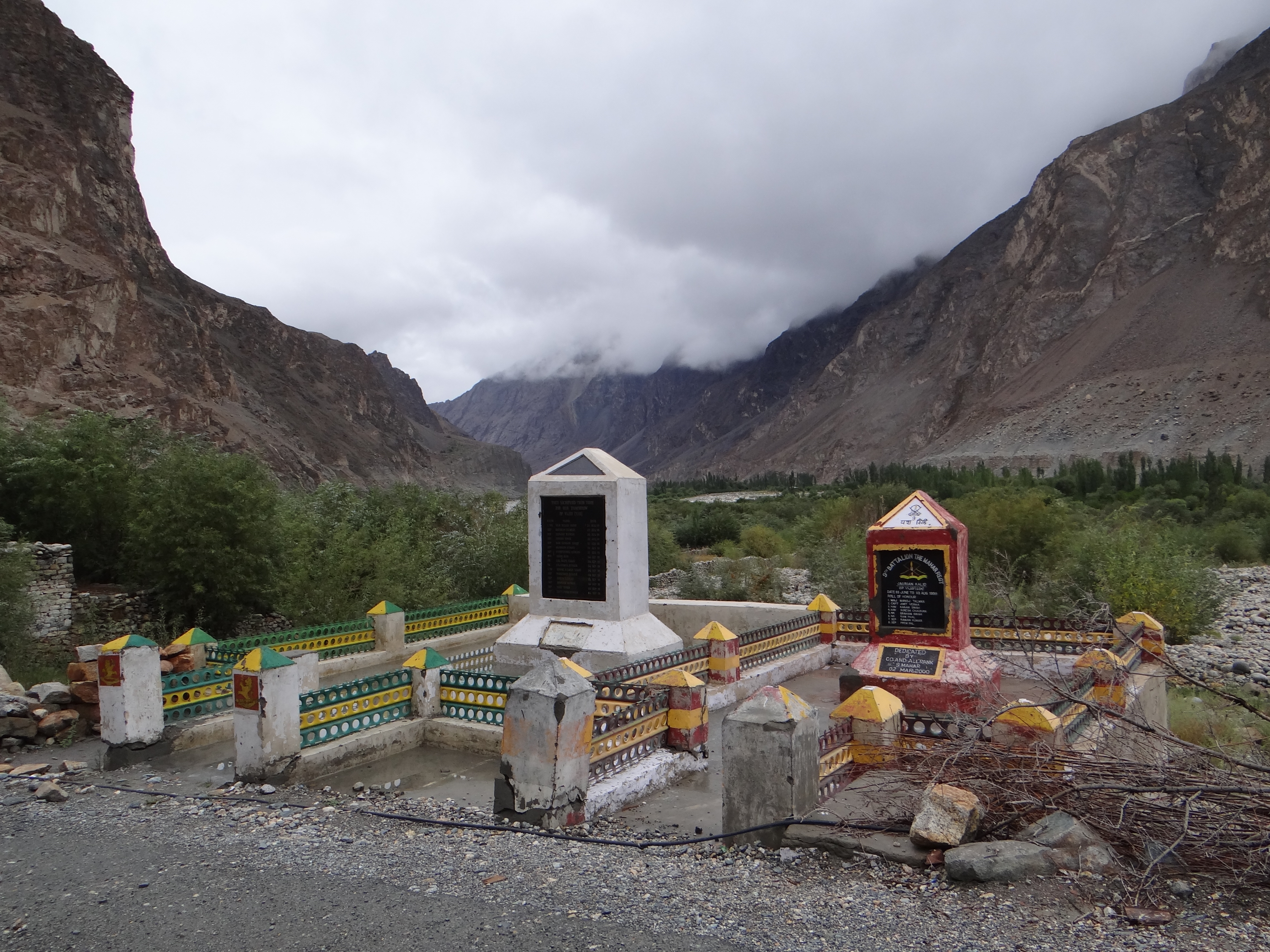
War Memorial in Turtuk

During the Indo-Pakistani War of 1947–1948, the Gilgit Scouts based in Gilgit overthrew the Dogra administration and subsequently invaded the Baltistan region. At the end of that war, Turtuk came under the control of Pakistan along with most of Baltistan.

During the Indo-Pakistani War of 1971, this area was the site of the Battle of Turtuk. India's Ladakh Scouts and Nubra Guards, under the command of Brigadier Udai Singh, entered the village after Pakistani forces had retreated a day earlier. Udai Singh and his second-in-command Major Chewang Rinchen were both honoured with a Maha Vir Chakra for their gallantry and a street in Leh is named after Major Rinchen.

=== Since 1971 ===
In 1999, the two countries once again had a major conflict around this area during the Kargil War. There are memorials built in memory of soldiers on Main Road going towards the zero point of the India–Pakistan Line of Control.

The local people are unsure of their loyalties because they have lived under both Pakistani and Indian control, and some of them served in the Pakistan Army before India's take-over. Many of them also have relatives living across the Line of Control. During the Kargil infiltration by Pakistan, some of the local people were suspected to have assisted the infiltrators.

==== 2010 floods ====
In August 2010, the village of Turtuk was impacted by floods which occurred throughout the entire region of Ladakh.

== Geography ==
Turtuk and vicinity

Turtuk lies in the region of Baltistan, a region almost completely controlled by Pakistan. Turtuk is one of five Balti-populated villages under Indian control, the other four being Bogdang, Tyakshi, Chalunkha and Dhothang. It is the largest of the villages and has a claim to being the historical capital of the southern Chorbat section of the Shyok Valley. While Bogdang had been part of Indian-administered Ladakh since 1948, the other four villages were captured by Indian Army during the 1971 war.

== Demographics ==
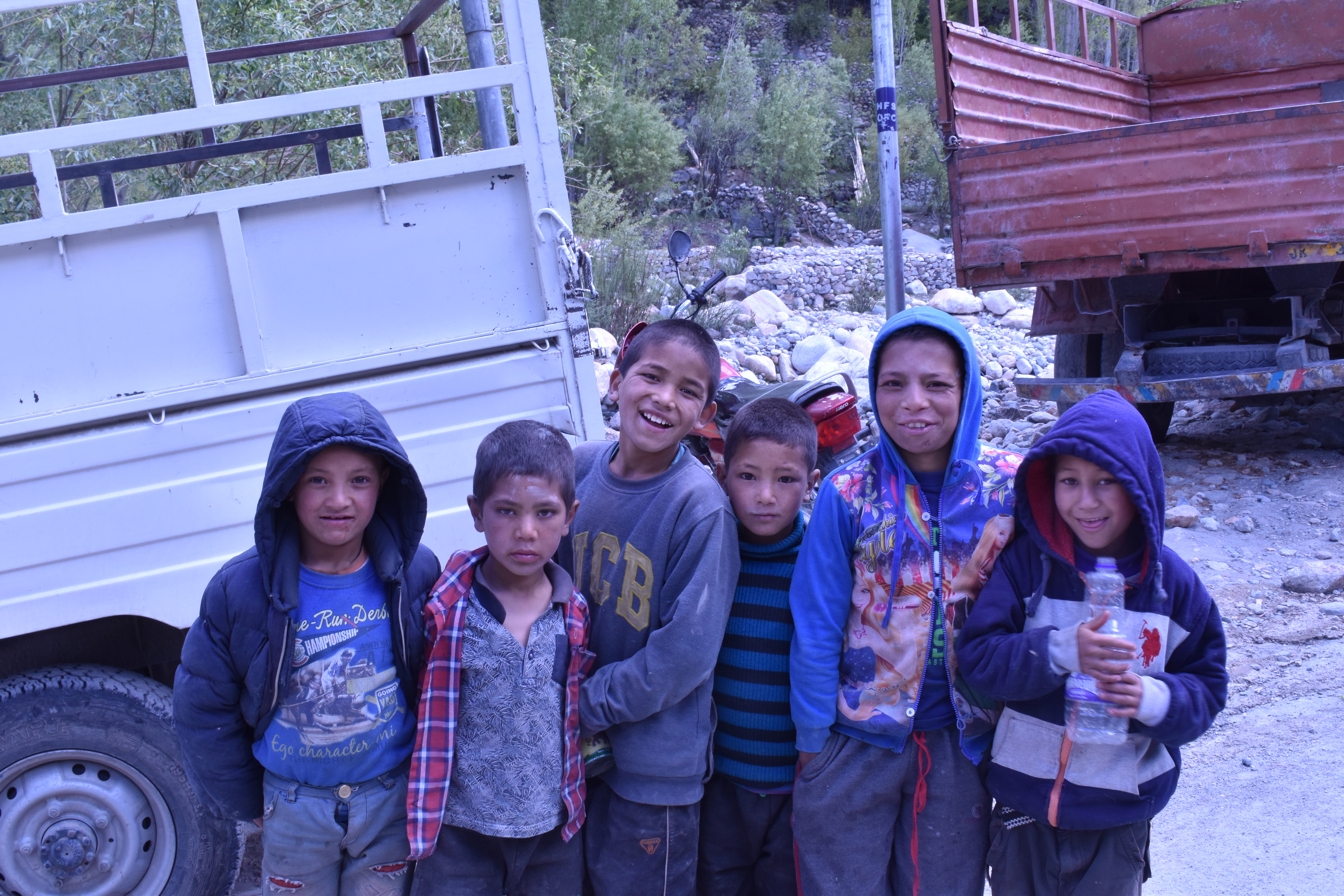
Children in Turtuk pose for a picture.

According to the 2011 census of India, Turtuk has 384 households. The effective literacy rate (i.e. the literacy rate of population excluding children aged 6 and below) is 82.53%. The residents of Turtuk and its adjoining villages speak the Balti language along with Ladakhi and Urdu.

Demographics (2011 Census)
	Total	Male	Female
Population	3371	2429	942
Children aged below 6 years	343	154	189
Scheduled caste	0	0	0
Scheduled tribe	1766	839	927
Literates	2499	2115	384
Workers (all)	2274	1953	321
Main workers (total)	2047	1840	207
Main workers: Cultivators	371	200	171
Main workers: Agricultural labourers	2	1	1
Main workers: Household industry workers	1	1	0
Main workers: Other	1673	1638	35
Marginal workers (total)	227	113	114
Marginal workers: Cultivators	50	7	43
Marginal workers: Agricultural labourers	3	3	0
Marginal workers: Household industry workers	0	0	0
Marginal workers: Others	174	103	71
Non-workers	1097	476	621

== Tourism ==
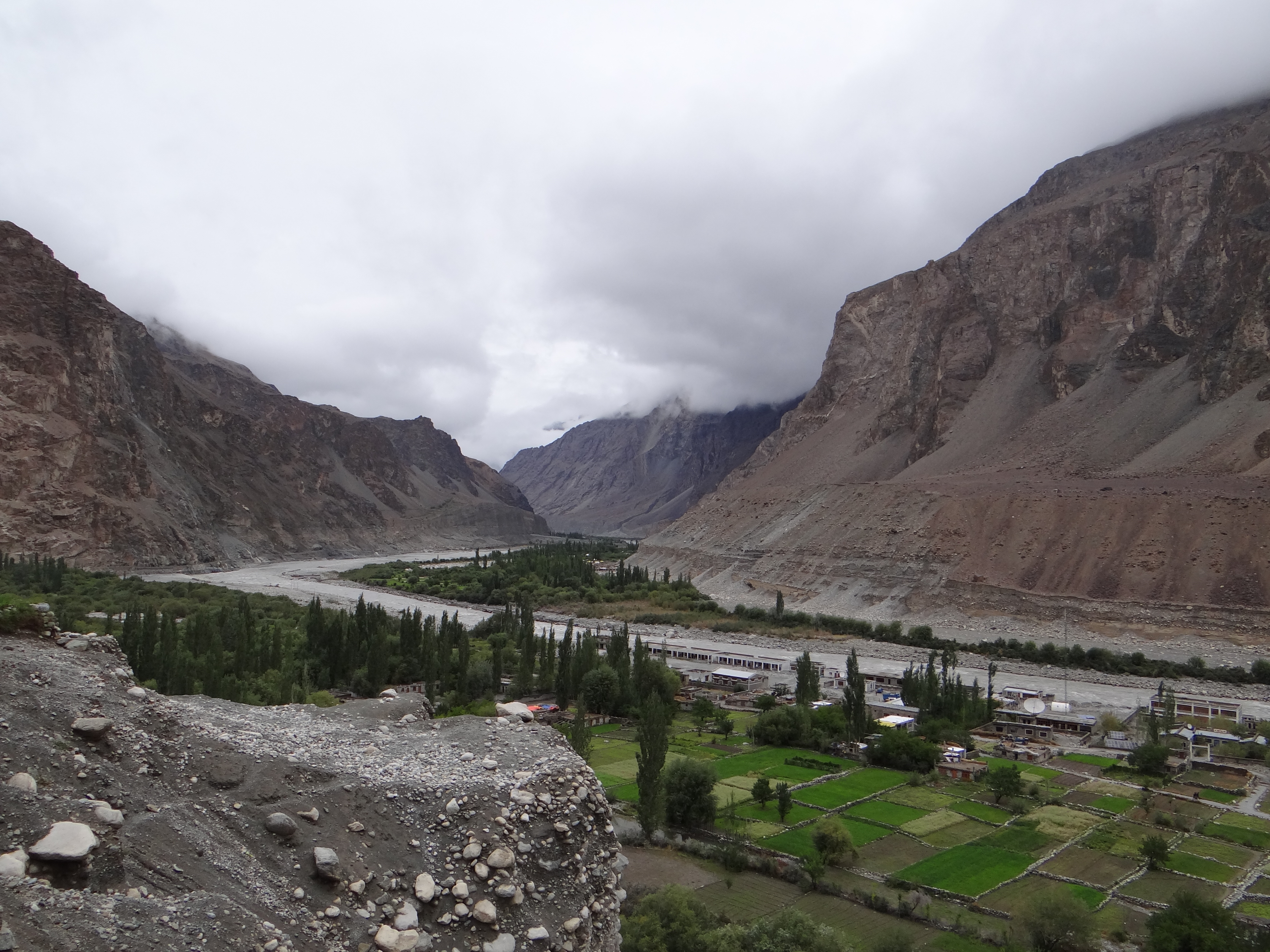
View of the Shyok Valley.

Turtuk was opened to tourists in 2010. The village offers views of the Shyok Valley.

There are a few gompas located on the plateau above the Shyok River and there is an old royal house to see in the village. Turtuk is one of the few places in India where one can witness Balti culture, and one can find a few homestays and guest houses in the village. It is the last major village where tourist activity is allowed before the Line of Control.

== See also ==
- Chewang Rinchen, the youngest ever recipient of the Maha Vir Chakra
- List of districts of Ladakh
- Geography of Ladakh
- Tourism in Ladakh

== Bibliography ==
- Dani, Ahmad Hasan (1991), History of Northern Areas of Pakistan (2nd ed.), National Institute of Historical and Cultural Research – via pahar.in

Media related to Turtuk at Wikimedia Commons
