= Thang, Ladakh =

Thang Dhothang, Thanga Chathang
- Town
- Location within Ladakh Location within India
- Coordinates: 34.926°N 76.795°E
- Country: India
- Union Territory: Ladakh
- District: Nubra
- Tehsil: Turtuk

Population (2011)
  - Total: 103
- Time zone: UTC+5:30 (IST)
- PIN: 194401
- Census code: 911

Thang (also called Dhothang, Thanga Chathang) is a small Town in the Nubra district of Ladakh, India. It is in the historical Chorbat region of Baltistan, divided between India and Pakistan by the 1972 Line of Control. Thang is part of the Turtuk tehsil and the Turtuk community development block. It is twinned with the village of Frano, Gilgit-Baltistan.

The village was seized from Pakistan along with three other villages in the area as a result of the Indo-Pakistani War of 1971. It is 2.5 kilometers from the Line of Control. The area's population is largely Balti.

== History ==
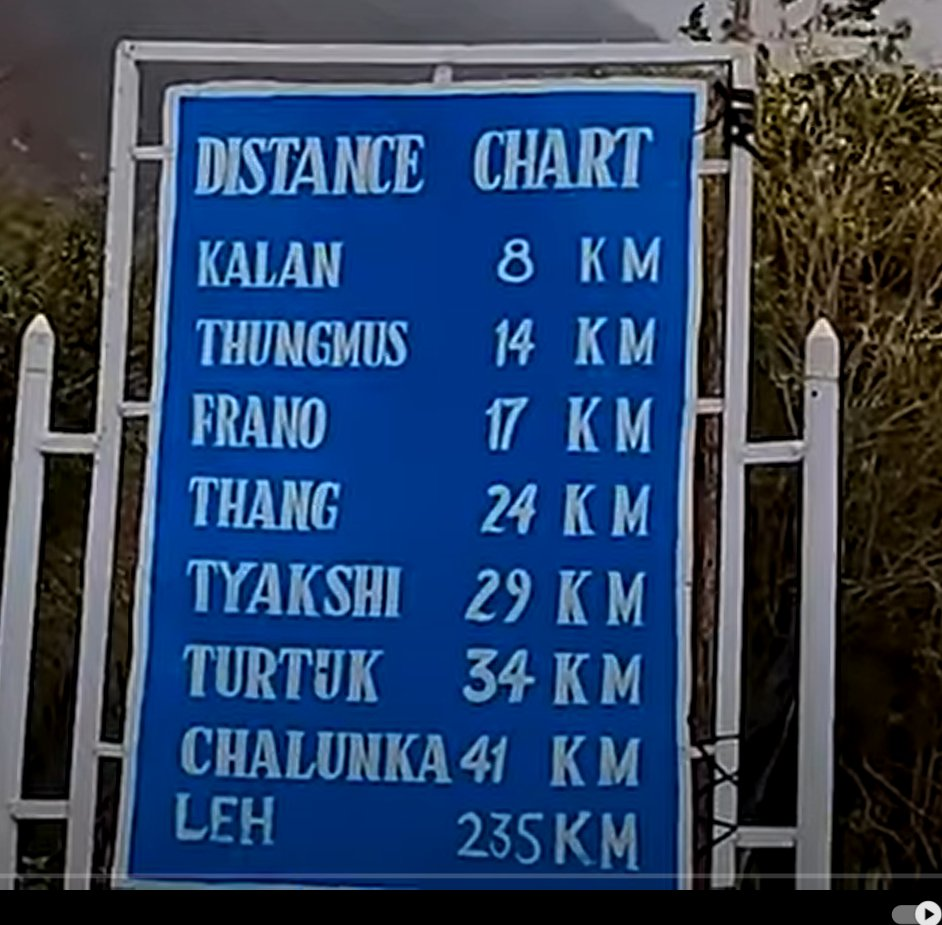
distance chart

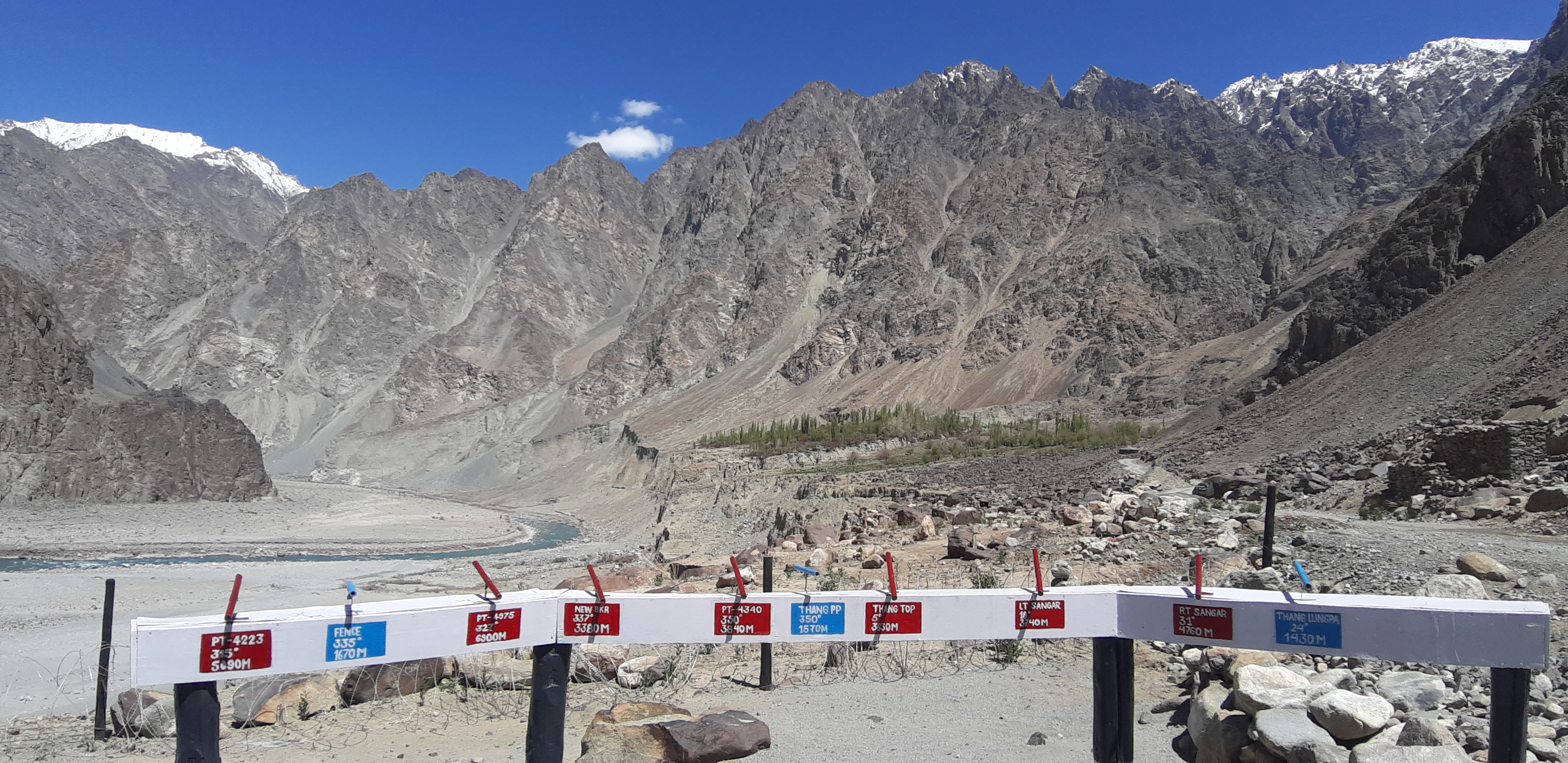
Thang View point

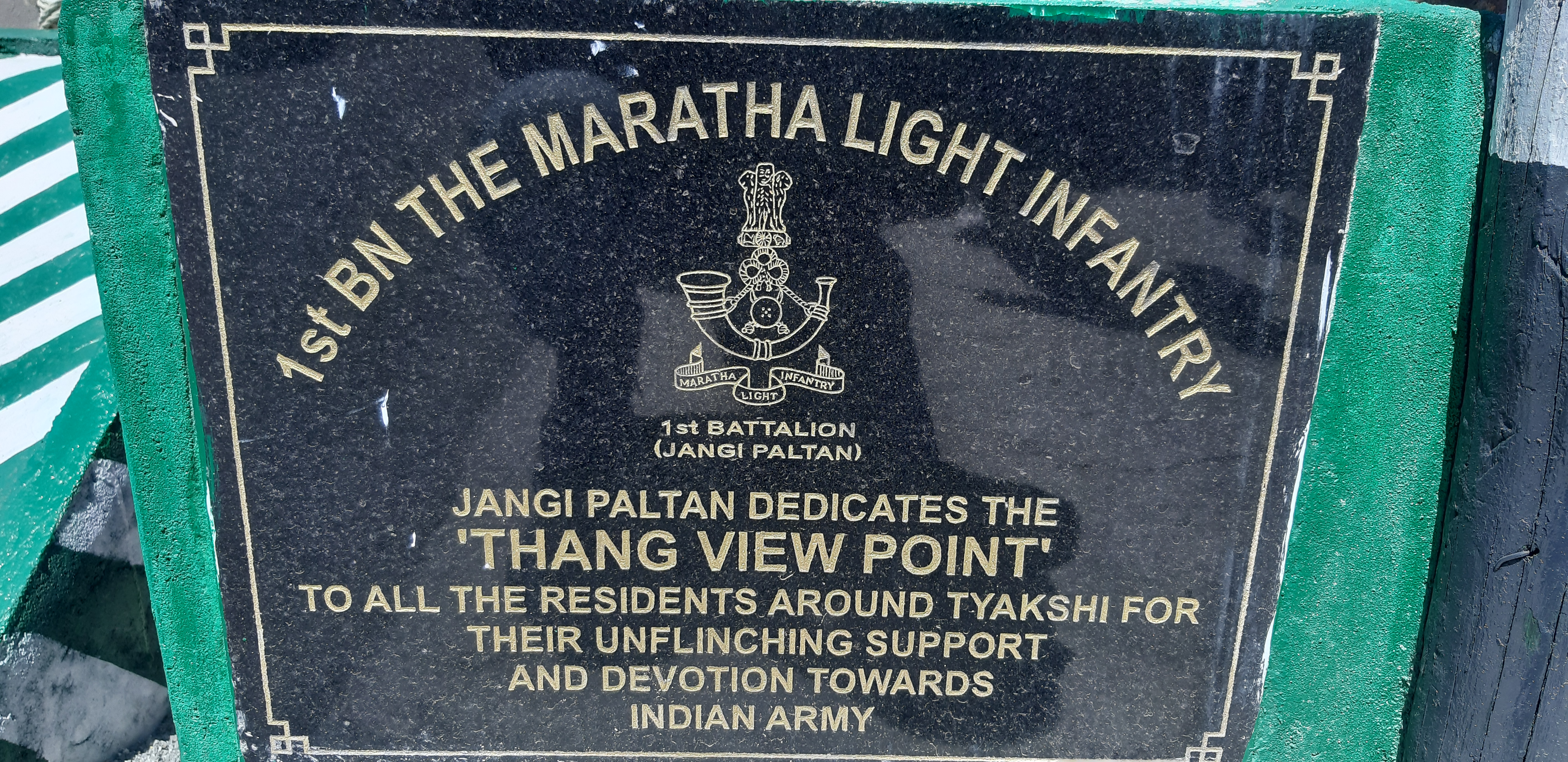
Thang View Point

See history of Turtuk and nearby areas.

== Demographics ==
According to the 2011 census of India, Thang had 16 households in that year. The effective literacy rate (i.e. the literacy rate of population excluding children aged 6 and below) was 63.41%.

Demographics (2011 Census)
	Total	Male	Female
Population	103	53	50
Children aged below 6 years	21	11	10
Scheduled caste	0	0	0
Scheduled tribe	88	45	43
Literates	52	27	25
Workers (all)	48	25	23
Main workers (total)	36	19	17
Main workers: Cultivators	34	18	16
Main workers: Agricultural labourers	0	0	0
Main workers: Household industry workers	0	0	0
Main workers: Other	2	1	1
Marginal workers (total)	12	6	6
Marginal workers: Cultivators	5	3	2
Marginal workers: Agricultural labourers	0	0	0
Marginal workers: Household industry workers	1	0	1
Marginal workers: Others	6	3	3
Non-workers	55	28	27

== See also ==
- Chewang Rinchen
- Frano, Gilgit-Baltistan
- Indo-Pakistani War of 1971
