= Anam =

Anam or ANAM may refer to:

== Music ==
- Anam (band), a modern folk music band
- Anam (album), by the Irish band Clannad
- Australian National Academy of Music (ANAM), a classical music training facility in Melbourne

== Names ==
- Anam (name), a given name and surname
- Anam, a possible transliteration of Inaam, a given name of Arabic origin meaning "gift"

== Places ==
- Anam, Cameroon, a village
- Anam (town), a group of eight towns in Anambra State, Nigeria
- Anam, a political unit within Oruk Anam, Akwa Ibom State, Nigeria
- Anam-dong, a neighbourhood (dong) in Seongbuk-gu, Seoul, South Korea
- Anam, more usually Annam (French protectorate), a former territory in central Vietnam

== Other uses ==
- Anam Legrand — a series of electrical installation products
- Agence Nationale des Aerodromes et de la Meteorologie (ANAM), an Ivory Coast organisation; see List of airline codes (A)
- Anam Station, a station on the Seoul Metropolitan Subway
- Anam language, spoken in Papua New Guinea
- Automated Neuropsychological Assessment Metrics, a battery of tests of cognitive functioning
- Gabriel V (Advanced Naval Attack Missile), an Israeli anti-ship missile
- Anam (novel), 2023 novel by Australian author André Dao

== See also ==
- Annam (disambiguation)
