= List of University of Strathclyde people =

This list of University of Strathclyde people includes notable graduates, professors, and administrators affiliated with the University of Strathclyde, located in Glasgow, Scotland, United Kingdom.

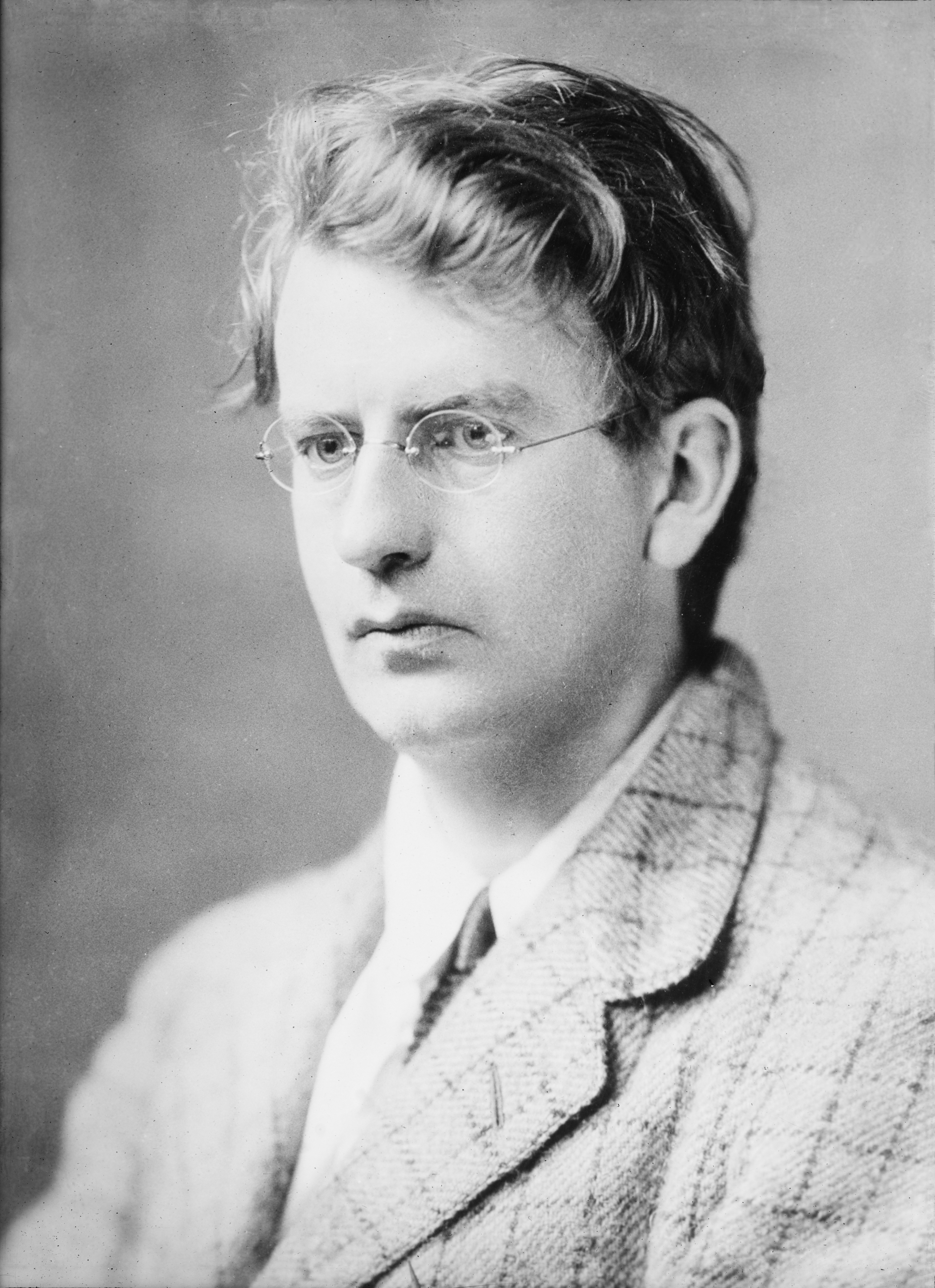
John Logie Baird, inventor

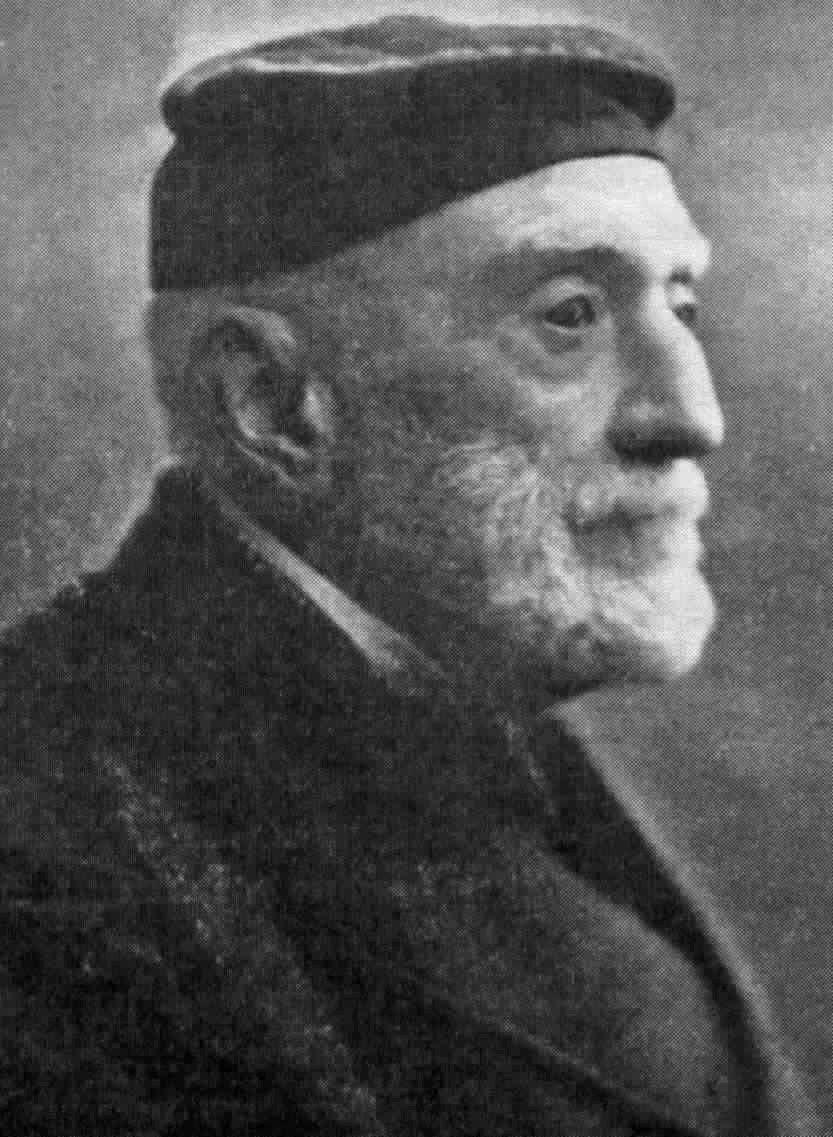
Henry Faulds, inventor

David Livingstone, explorer

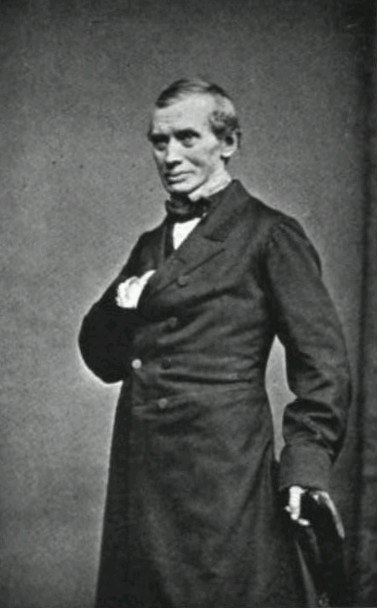
Thomas Graham, chemist

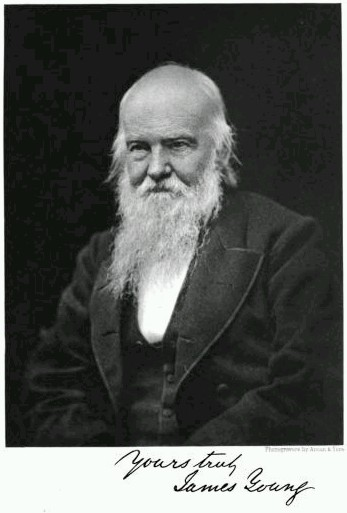
James Young, chemist

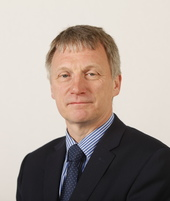
Ivan Paul McKee, member of Scottish Parliament

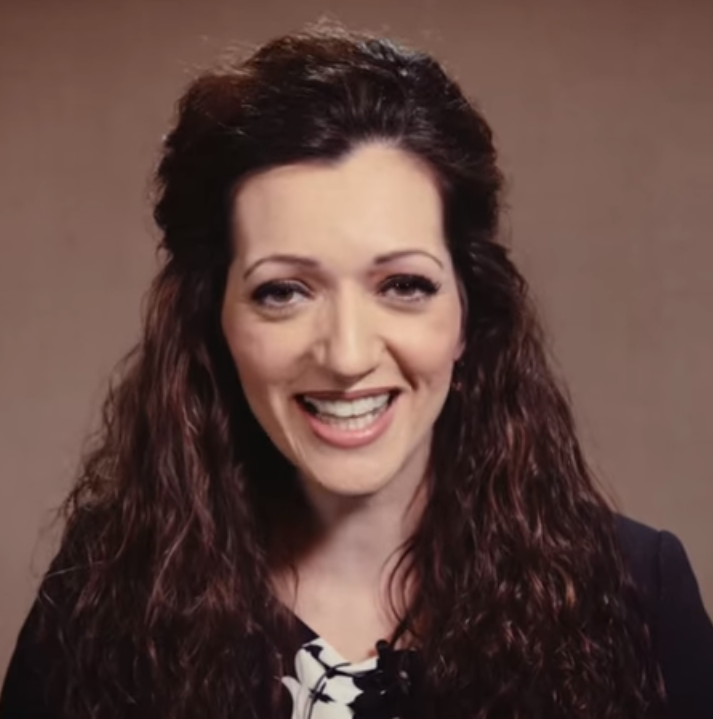
Tasmina Ahmed-Sheikh, Scottish politician

== Principals and vice chancellors ==
- Samuel Curran (1964–1981; Curran previously served as Principal of the Royal College of Science and Technology from 1959–64)
- Graham Hills (1981–1991)
- John Arbuthnott (1991–2001)
- Andrew Hamnett (2001–2009)
- Jim McDonald (2009–2025)
- Stephen McArthur (2025–)

== Academics ==
- James Croll, early investigator of climate change (Keeper of the Anderson College Library)
- John Curtice, political scientist
- Wilhelm (William) Dittmar, full professor at Anderson College
- Thomas Graham, chemist and first professor of chemistry at the Anderson's Medical School
- David Hillier, professor in the Accounting and Finance Department
- David Judge, professor of politics in the Department of Government
- Rebecca Lunn, professor in the Department of Civil and Environmental
- Conor McBride, computer scientist
- Colin R. McInnes, professor of space systems engineering
- Alastair McIntosh, visiting professor of human ecology in the Department of Geography and Sociology
- Richard Rose, professor of politics; Director of the Centre for the Study of Public Policy, 1966–2005
- John Sherwood, professor of chemistry, vice-principal
- Zoe Shipton, professor of geological engineering
- Richard Susskind, law professor
- Kim Swales, economics
- Terence Wade, professor of Russian studies

== Alumni ==
- Omar Abdullah, politician in India, Chief Minister of Jammu and Kashmir, former Minister of State for External Affairs
- Tasmina Ahmed-Sheikh, Scottish politician and chair of the Alba Party
- Elish Angiolini, Lord Advocate
- John Logie Baird, inventor of television
- Kenny Boyle, actor, playwright, and author
- Ed Byrne, comedian
- Alastair Campbell, Lord Bracadale, Senator of the College of Justice, Lord Commissioner of Justiciary
- Gerry Colgan, chemistry teacher and footballer
- Joe Docherty, Baron Docherty of Milngavie, Labour peer
- Dougie Donnelly, BBC Sport presenter
- Alex Ekwueme, Vice President of Nigeria
- Henry Faulds, inventor of fingerprinting
- John Giannandrea, head of Google Search
- Annabel Goldie, former leader of the Conservatives in the Scottish Parliament
- Alex Gray, author
- Frank Hadden, former coach of the Scotland national rugby union team
- Hugh Hendry, founder and manager of hedge fund Eclectica Asset Management
- Tom Hunter, billionaire entrepreneur
- K M Baharul Islam, Professor and Chair of Public Policy and Government Center at Indian Institute of Management Kashipur; Fellow, Indian Institute of Advanced Study
- Sanjay Jha, co-CEO of Motorola, Inc.; Chief Executive Officer of Motorola Mobile Devices
- Alex Kapranos, lead singer of Franz Ferdinand, Alumnus of the Year 2005
- Martin Kelner, radio broadcaster
- Amar Latif, entrepreneur, world traveller, TV personality, Alumnus of the Year 2006
- Helen Liddell, minister in Blair government; former British High Commissioner to Australia
- David Livingstone, explorer and missionary
- Brendan O'Hara, Member of Parliament for Argyll and Bute
- Antoin MacGabhann, Irish architect
- Mouzhan Majidi, architect and CEO of Foster and Partners
- Lauren Mayberry, singer of CHVRCHES
- Ian McAllister, Distinguished Professor of Political Science at the Australian National University
- John McFall, Baron McFall of Alcluith, Lord Speaker
- Gail McGrane, meteorologist for BBC Scotland
- Ann McKechin, Member of Parliament
- Ivan McKee, Member of the Scottish Parliament
- Carol Monaghan, Scottish Member of Parliament, representing west end of Glasgow
- Jim Murphy, Labour Member of Parliament and former Secretary of State for Scotland
- Ainun Nishat, academician
- Temidayo Isaiah Oniosun, space scientist and entrepreneur
- Sandra Osborne, Member of Parliament
- Nikos Pappas, Greek economist and politician
- Iain Peebles, Lord Bannatyne, Senator of the College of Justice, Lord Commissioner of Justiciary
- Patrick Prosser, computer scientist
- Chris Sawyer, computer game developer
- Toni Scullion, award-winning computer science teacher
- Tommy Sheridan, Scottish politician
- Tyrone Smith, North sports editor and presenter on STV News
- Brian Souter, co-founder of the Stagecoach Group
- Iain Stewart, geologist and TV presenter
- Teuea Toatu, Vice-President of Kiribati
- Andrew Wyllie, civil engineer, CEO of the Costain Group and 154th president of the Institution of Civil Engineers
- Rachel Wynberg, South African biopiracy researcher
- James Young, chemist
- Alice Lau, Deputy Speaker of the Dewan Rakyat II
