= Swail =

Swail is a surname. Notable people with the name include:

- Brad Swail, Canadian voice actor
- Doug Swail (born c. 1930), Canadian football player
- Joe Swail (born 1969), Northern Irish snooker player
- Julie Swail (born 1972), American Water Polo player

== See also ==
- Swale (disambiguation)
- Swails, surname
