= Himalayan Highs =

Himalayan Highs, an initiative launched by TVS Motor Company, which was an enabler for women riders to take up a long road trips on a Scooty Zest 110. The initiative gained fame in 2015 after India's Youngest Women stunt rider Anam Hashim became the first woman on a 110 cc scooter to complete the trip to Khardung La, a mountain pass in the Himalayas on a TVS Scooty Zest 110. This pass is considered the world's highest motorable stretch and Anam's feat has been included in the India Book of Records.

For the Season 2 of Himalayan Highs, 10 women were shortlisted after a selection process that included 2000 entries from across India. Each woman was given a TVS Scooty Zest 110 with a choice of colour, while Anam Hashim led the team riding the Himalayan Highs Special Edition of the scooter. Himalayan Highs Season 2 kicked off on August 11, 2016, and concluded on August 21, 2016. The entourage earned themselves a place in India Book of Records for being the first group of women riders to conquer Khardung La on a 110cc scooter.
