= Enaam =

Enaam is a given name. Notable people with the name include:

- Enaam Ahmed (born 4 February 2000), British racing driver of Pakistani descent
- Enaam Arnaout (born 1962), Syrian American criminal
- Enaam Elgretly (born 1944), Egyptian actress
