= Indian Institute of Management Kashipur =

Public business school located in Kashipur, Uttarakhand, India

- Type: Public business school
- Established: 2011; 15 years ago
- Chairman: Sandeep Singh
- Director: Neeraj Dwivedi
- Location: Kashipur, Uttarakhand, India; 29°13′57.4″N 79°00′46.3″E
- Campus: Urban
- Website: www.iimkashipur.ac.in

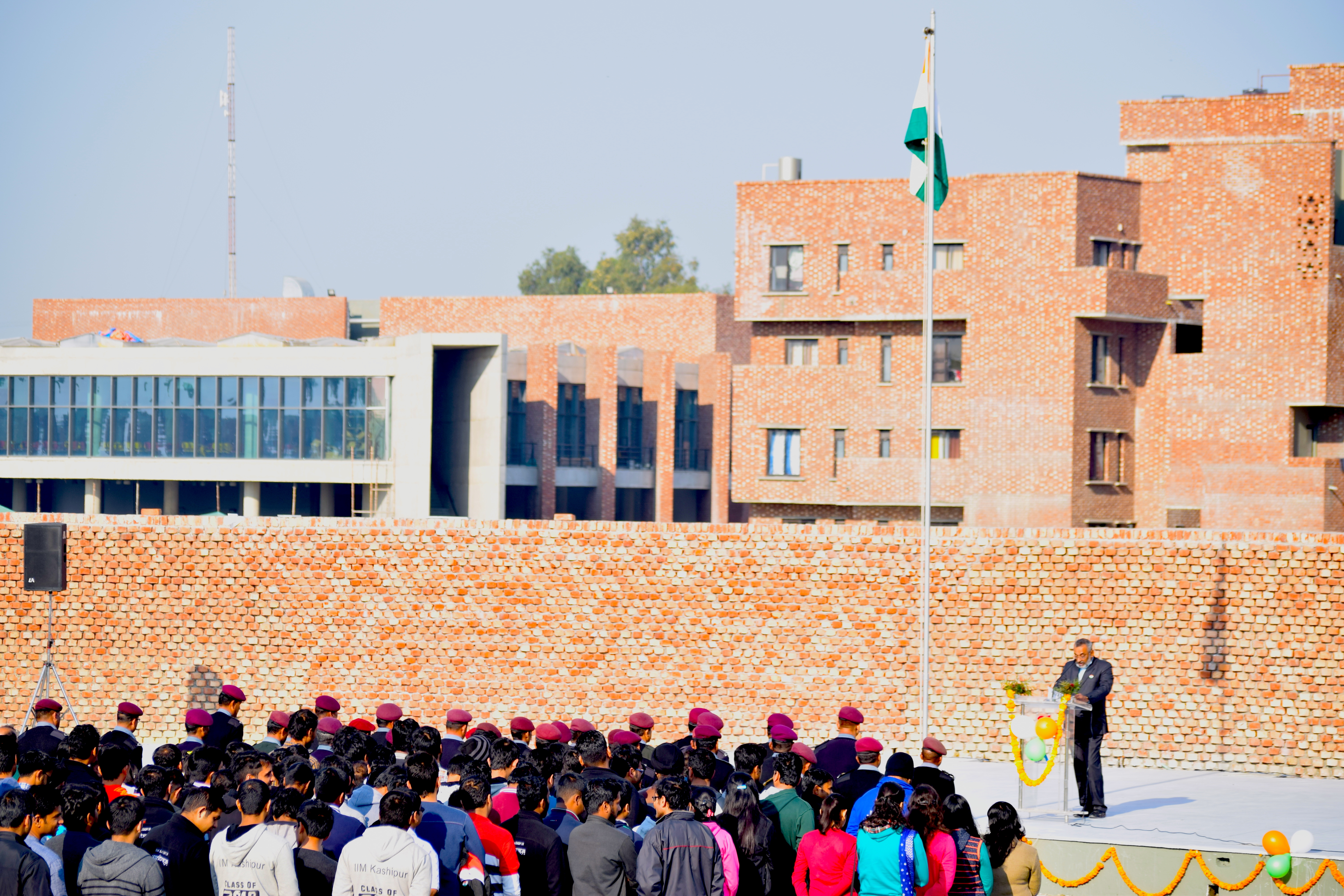
IIM Kashipur during Republic Day

Indian Institute of Management Kashipur also known as IIM Kashipur, is a public business school located in Kashipur, Uttarakhand, India. It is one of the thirteen Indian Institutes of Management the government has set up during the Eleventh Five-Year Plan. The foundation stone of the institute was laid on 29 April 2011.

This autonomous institute offers a two-year Post Graduate Programme in Management (PGPM), a two-year Executive Post Graduate Programme in Management (EPGPM), a residential Fellowship Programme in Management (FPM, equivalent to PhD) and a non-residential doctoral Executive Fellowship Programme in Management (EFPM).

== Campus ==
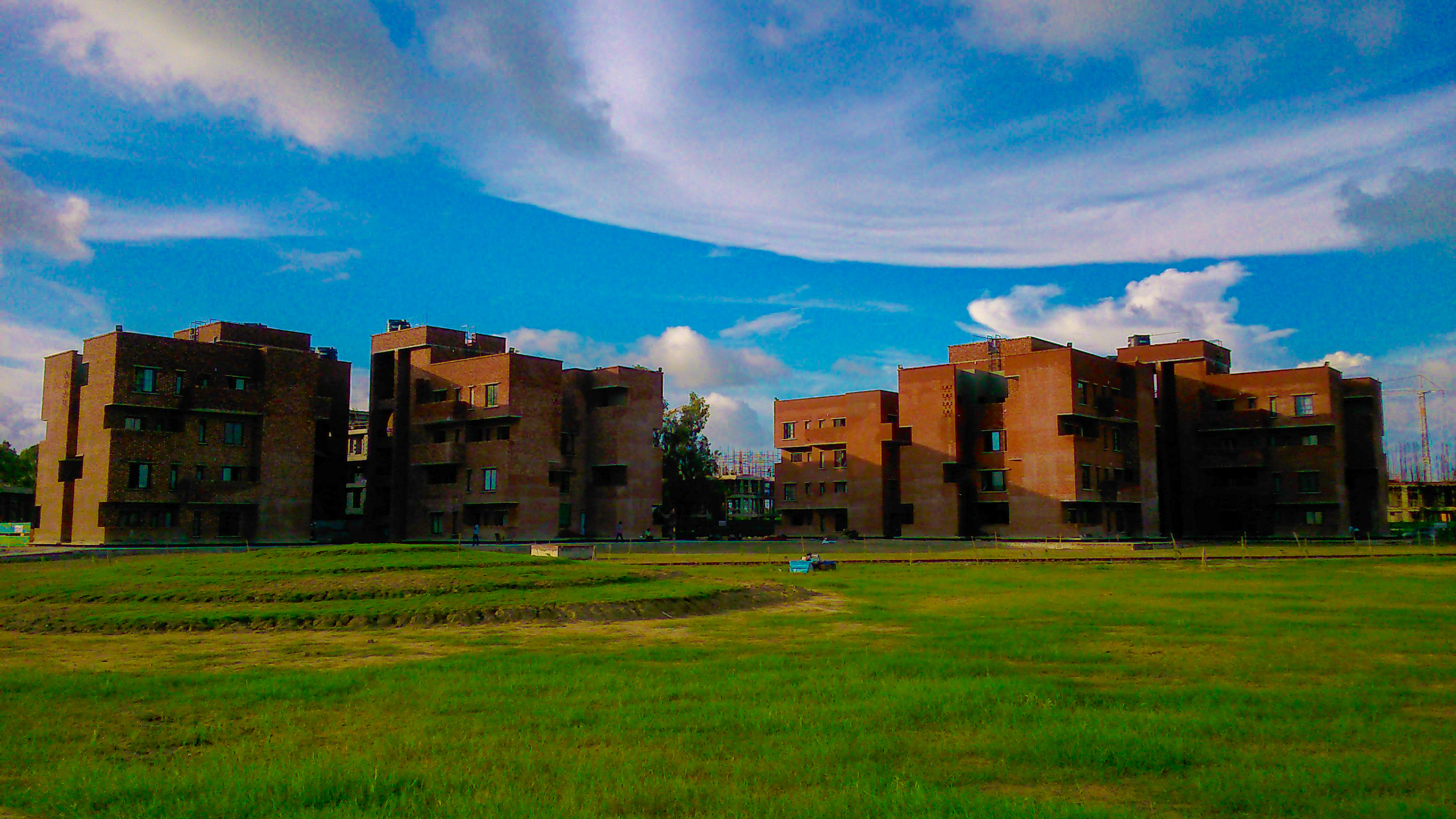
IIM Kashipur Hostel New Campus

IIM Kashipur operates from a campus of 200 acres (0.81 km^{2}) located in Kashipur, Uttarakhand.

== Organisation and administration ==
=== Governance ===
Prof. Neeraj Dwivedi is the director of the institute. Mr. Sandeep Singh is the interim chairman of the board of governors for the institute. Dr Somnath Chakrabarti is presently the Dean (Academics) of the institute.

== Academics ==
=== Academic programmes ===
The institute offers a two-year flagship residential course which is the Post Graduate Programme in Management (PGP). Since 2014 it also offers a residential Fellowship Programme in Management (FPM), a non-residential Doctor of Business Administration Executive Fellowship Programme in Management (EFPM) and short term Management Development Programmes (MDP) for corporate executives.

=== International Relations & Student Exchange Program ===
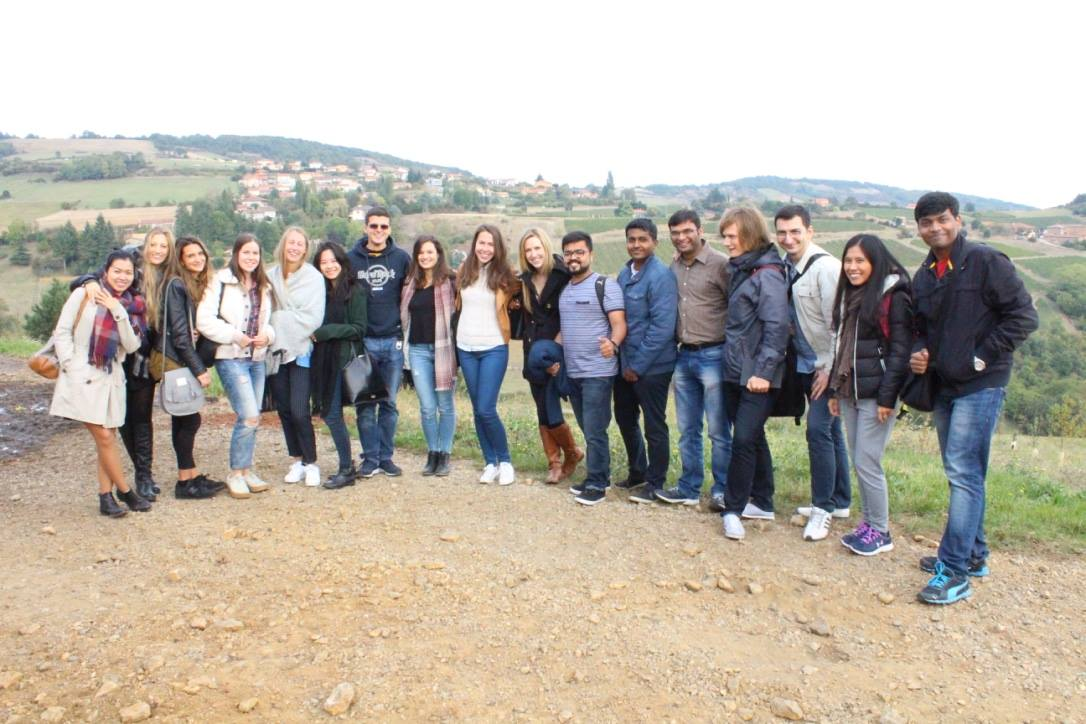
Student Exchange to France

IIM Kashipur has established cooperative relations with École de management de Normandie (EM Normandie), Caen, Le Havre, Deauville, France as well as École supérieure pour le développement économique et social (ESDES) School of Business and Management, Lyon, France so as to further develop academic and cultural interchanges between the institutions through mutual assistance in the areas of education and research. The programme includes short-term exchange of students, exchange of faculty and development of joint research activities.

=== Partnerships ===
- A memorandum of understanding signed between Indian Institute of Management Kashipur and Broadcast Engineering Consultants India Limited (BECIL) at IIM campus in Kashipur on 20 Dec 2012 states that BECIL will assist the IIM to set up an FM Community Radio Station which will be first of its kind in any IIM in India. The MOU was signed by Prof Gautam Sinha, Director of IIM Kashipur and Sri Abhay Gupta, Deputy General manager of BECIL.
- A memorandum of understanding signed between Indian Institute of Management Kashipur and Asian Institute of Technology Bangkok at AIT campus in Bangkok on 19 Jan 2016 states that both IIM (Kashipur) and AIT will accept three exchange students beginning 2015–16. Both institutions will grant full credit transfer to the exchange students. The MOU was signed by Prof Gautam Sinha, Director (former) of IIM Kashipur and Prof. Worsak Kanok-Nukulchai, former AIT president.
- A memorandum of understanding was signed between Indian Institute of Management Kashipur and National Stock Exchange of India to run the financial market and certificate courses, management development programmes (MDPs), joint research project, to name a few courses in financial markets.
- ICICIdirect Centre for Financial Learning (IIFL) entered into a strategic alliance with Indian Institute of Management-Kashipur (IIM-KP) to offer management development programmes and executive education. The MoU will create a Knowledge Partnership between IIM-KP and ICFL

=== Ranking ===
Institute rankings

Business/Management – India
- NIRF (2022): 19

IIM Kashipur was ranked 19 in India by the National Institutional Ranking Framework (NIRF) in 2023.

== Student life ==
=== Events ===
==== Agnitraya ====
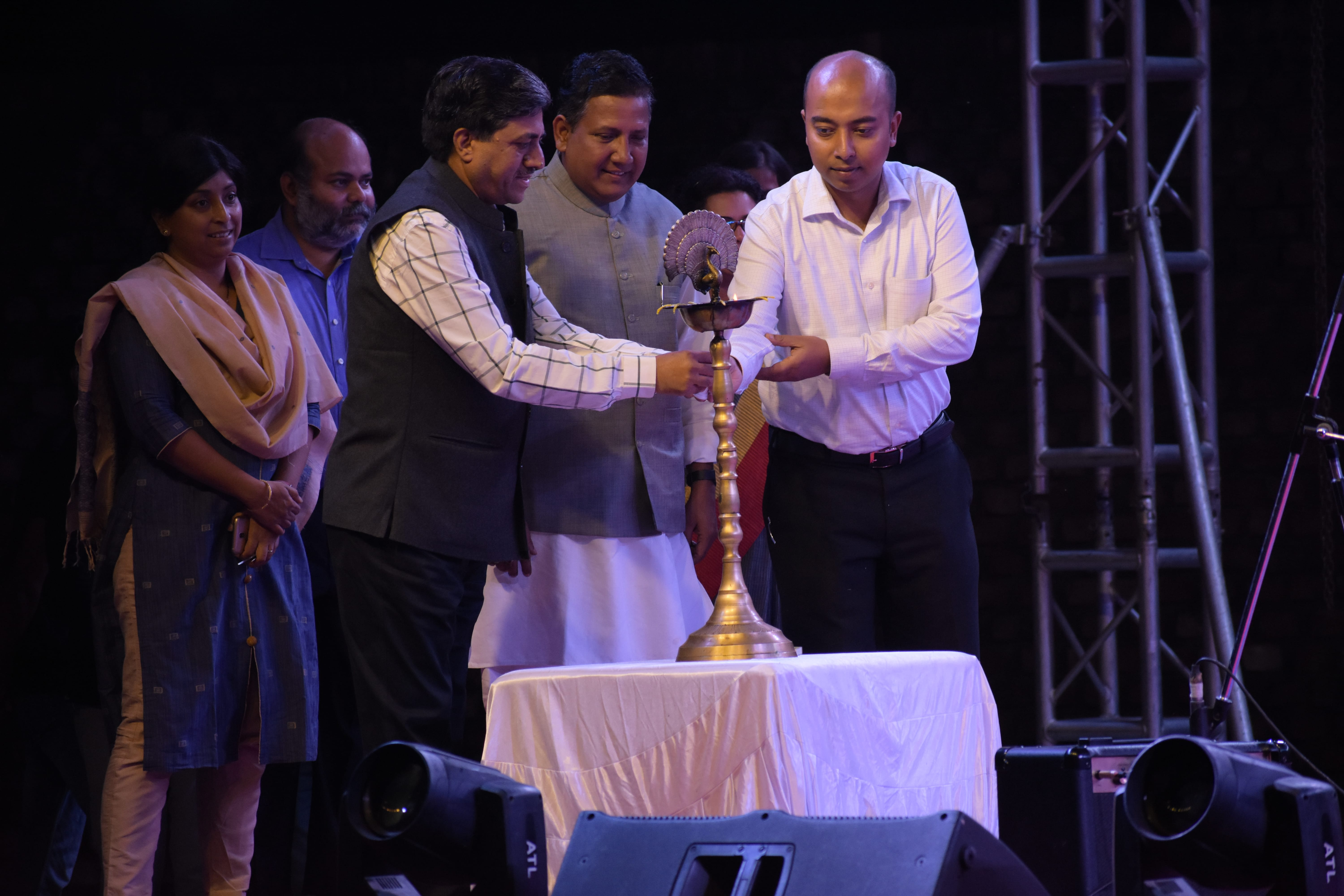
Lamp lighting at the inauguration of Agnitraya'19

Agnitraya is the annual flagship event of IIM Kashipur. It is a three-day inter-college fest consisting of events from Management, Sport and Cultural areas. Agnitraya'19 hosted over 1500 participants from over 30 colleges across India. As part of the fest, 10 management events, 15 sporting events, and 11 cultural events were conducted. In addition to these, Abhivyakti- an open mic recitation competition in association with The Social House, Model United Nations were also conducted. Star night performances by Harrdy Sandhu, DJ Duo Zephyrtone, popular stand-up comedians- Nishant Tanwar and Aakash Gupta were some of the major attractions of Agnitraya'19

==== Coalescence ====
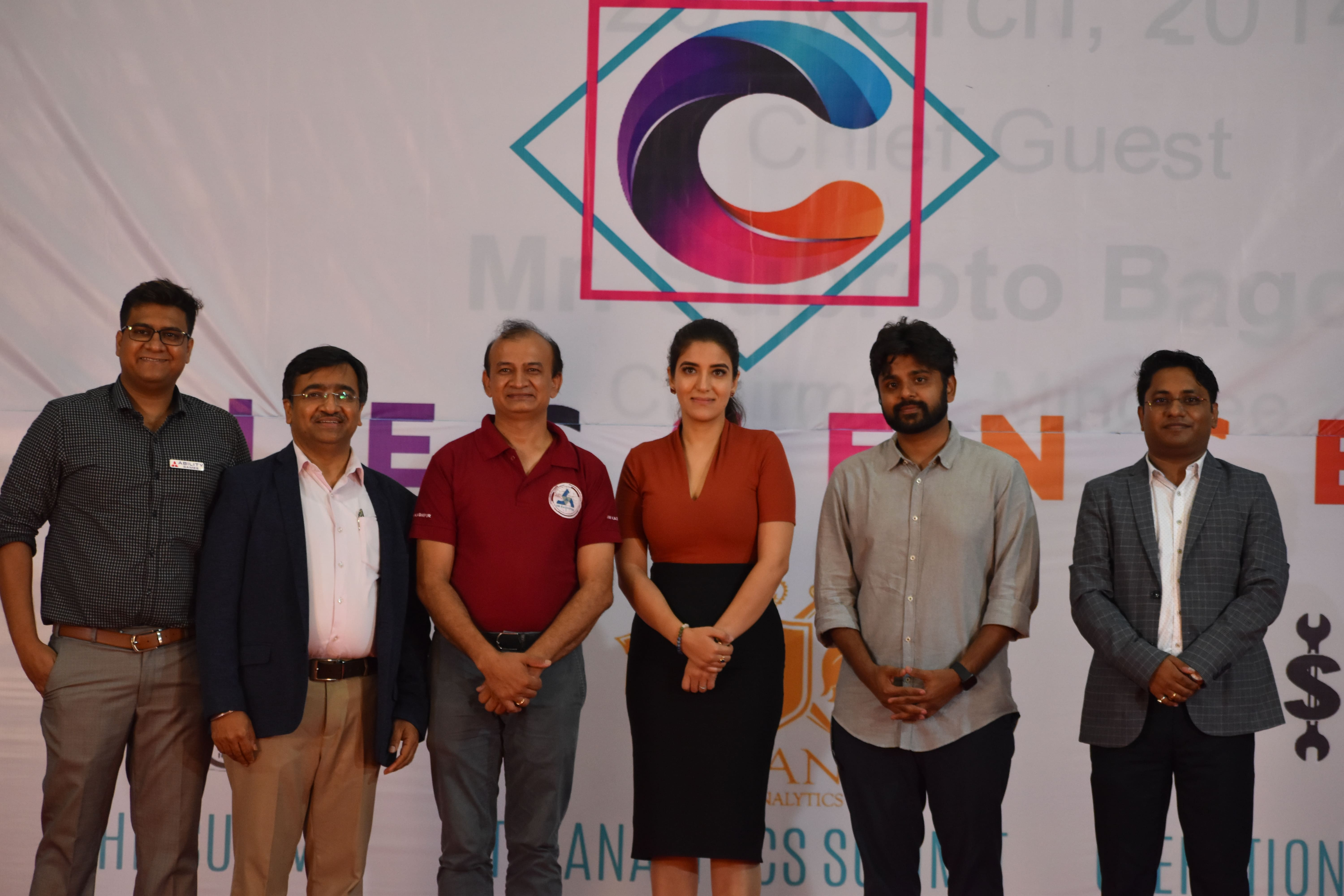
Coalescence 2019

Coalescence is the annual management conclave of IIM Kashipur aimed at industry-academia collaboration. It is a platform to bring together stalwarts from different domains of Marketing, Finance, Operations, IT & Analytics, HR and Consulting together to share their expertise and interact with the students of IIM Kashipur. Coalescence includes keynote speeches and panel discussions. The 2019 edition saw people from various companies including Star India, Honda Cars India Ltd. and Uber.

==== TEDxIIMKashipur ====
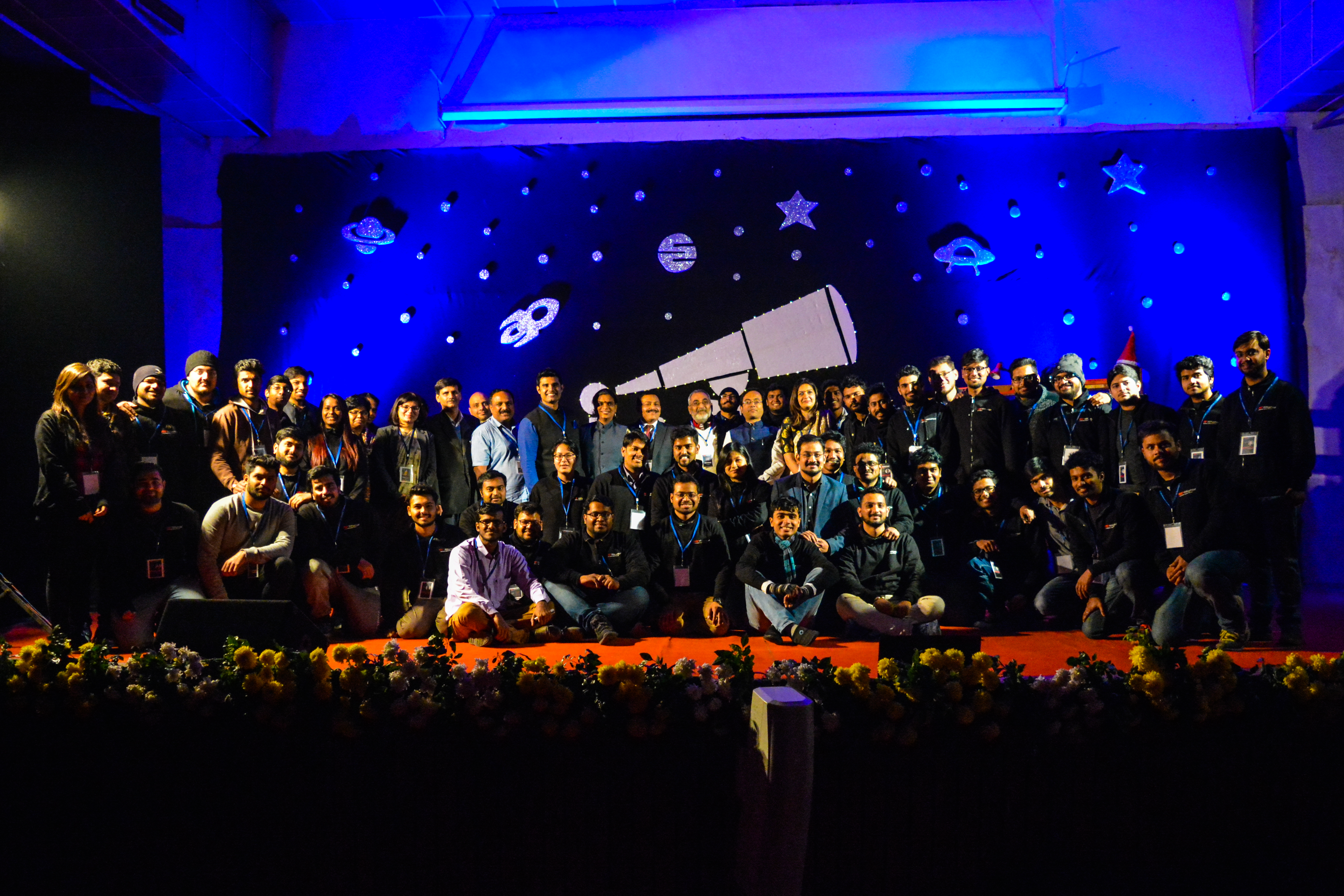
The Organizing Team of TEDxIIMKashipur 2018 with the Speakers

TEDxIIMKashipur is an independently organized event under the aegis of TED consisting of a series of talks by various accomplished and eminent personalities. The theme of TEDxIIMKashipur 2017 was 'Breaking Barriers' while the theme of TEDxIIMKashipur 2018 was 'Shaping the Future'. Past notable guests include Manvendra Singh Gohil, Seema Rao, Jadav Payeng, Ira Singhal, Thinlas Chorol, Nouf Marwaai, Gauri Sawant, Priyanka Chaturvedi, Rama Vaidyanathan and Anam Hashim.

==== Uttishtha - Entrepreneurship Summit ====
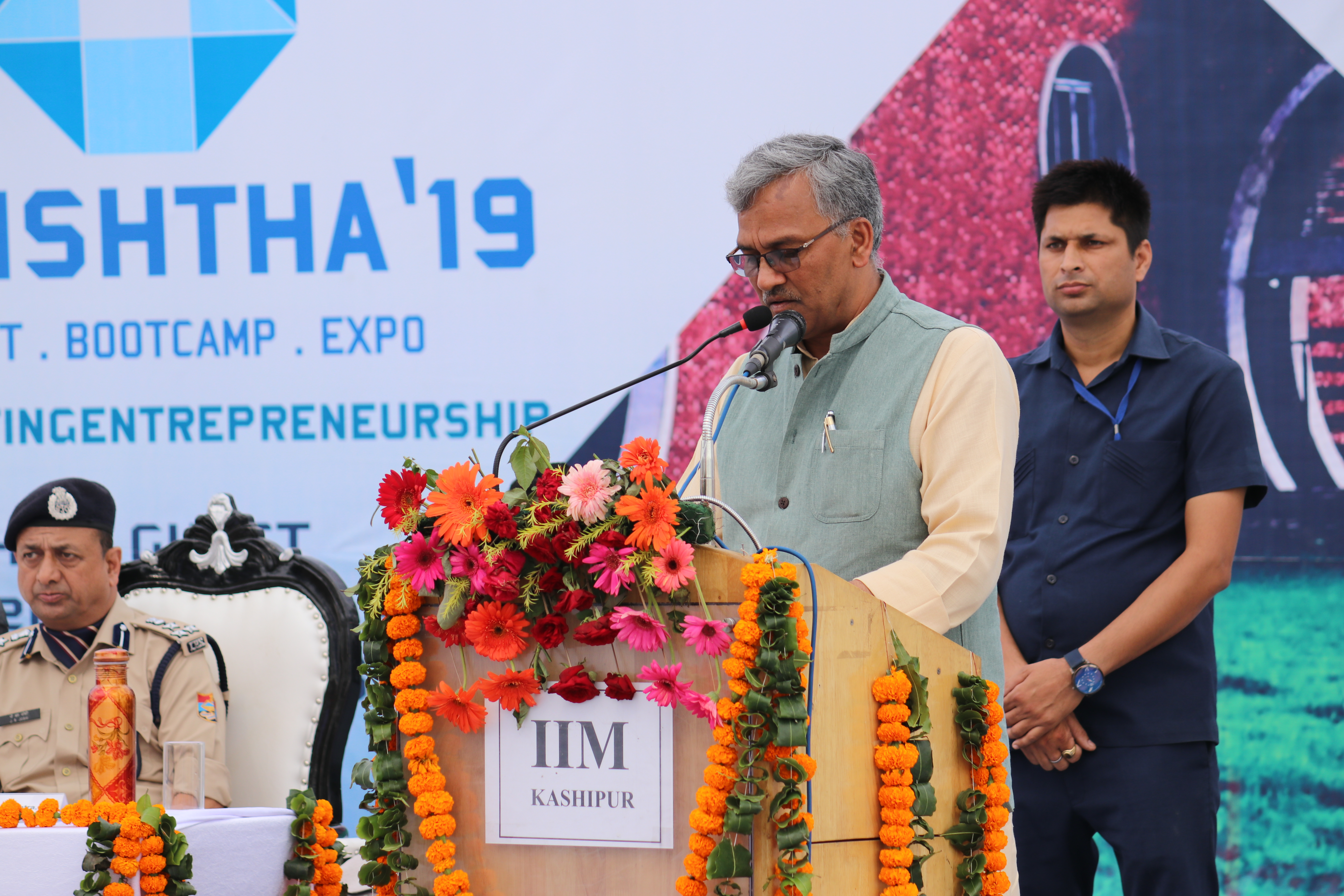
Shri Trivendra Singh Rawat, Chief Minister of Uttarakhand at Uttishtha 2019

Uttishtha is the annual entrepreneurship summit that acts as a platform for entrepreneurs to inspire and guide budding entrepreneurs. The event consists of keynote addresses, panel discussions, business plan competitions, and presentations. Some of the past guests of honor have been Shri Trivendra Singh Rawat, Hon'ble Chief Minister of Uttarakhand, Praveen Sinha (Founder, Jabong & Pincap), Akhil Gupta (co-founder, NoBroker), Avnish Sabharwal (MD, Accenture Ventures), Kaushlendra Kumar (Founder, Kaushalya Foundation), Lalit Mangal (co-founder, CommonFloor), Alok Bansal (co-founder, PolicyBazaar), etc.

== Notable faculty ==
- K M Baharul Islam

== Notable alumni ==
- Tirth Shah
- Tunir Sahoo
