= Na fir bolg =

Folk music festival

Na Fir Bolg
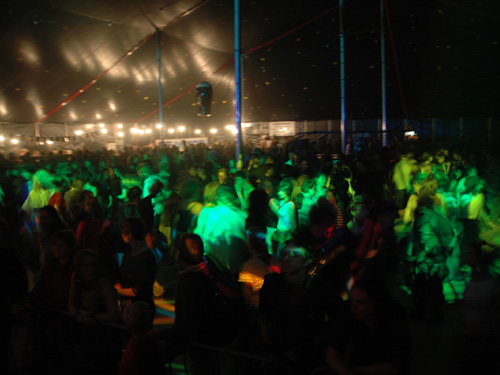
- Genre: Rock, folk
- Dates: Friday–Sunday around the beginning of July
- Locations: Vorselaar, Belgium
- Years active: 1995 – present
- Founders: Luc Janssens
- Website: http://www.folkfestival.be

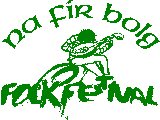
Thumb

Na Fir Bolg is a folk music festival, held annually in Vorselaar, Belgium. The festival always takes place on the first weekend of July.

The festival started in 1995 and has grown from a single evening to a three-day festival. It is now the biggest festival in Antwerp (6,000 visitors in 2009).

A few known groups who have played at Na Fir Bolg are: The Albion Band, John Kirkpatrick, Robb Johnson, Yevgueni, Bram Vermeulen, Mira, De Mens, The Popes and Anam.

== The round men ==
"Na Fir Bolg", which means "The round men" or "The bag men" in Gaelic, were a Gaelic tribe. This was mentioned by one of the crew of Na Fir Bolg in a pub in '95. Because all persons who thought of organising the festival were a bit fat, they called them self "the round men". "Na Fir Bolg" quickly became the name for the folk festival.

== Non-profit festival ==
Na Fir Bolg is a non-profit festival, every year a charity is chosen to support. In 2009 and 2010 they supported Catapa, an emerging volunteer movement in Belgium who are active in the fields of globalization (and how to change it) and sustainable development in Latin America.
