= Gordon Brown (author) =

Scottish author (born 1962)

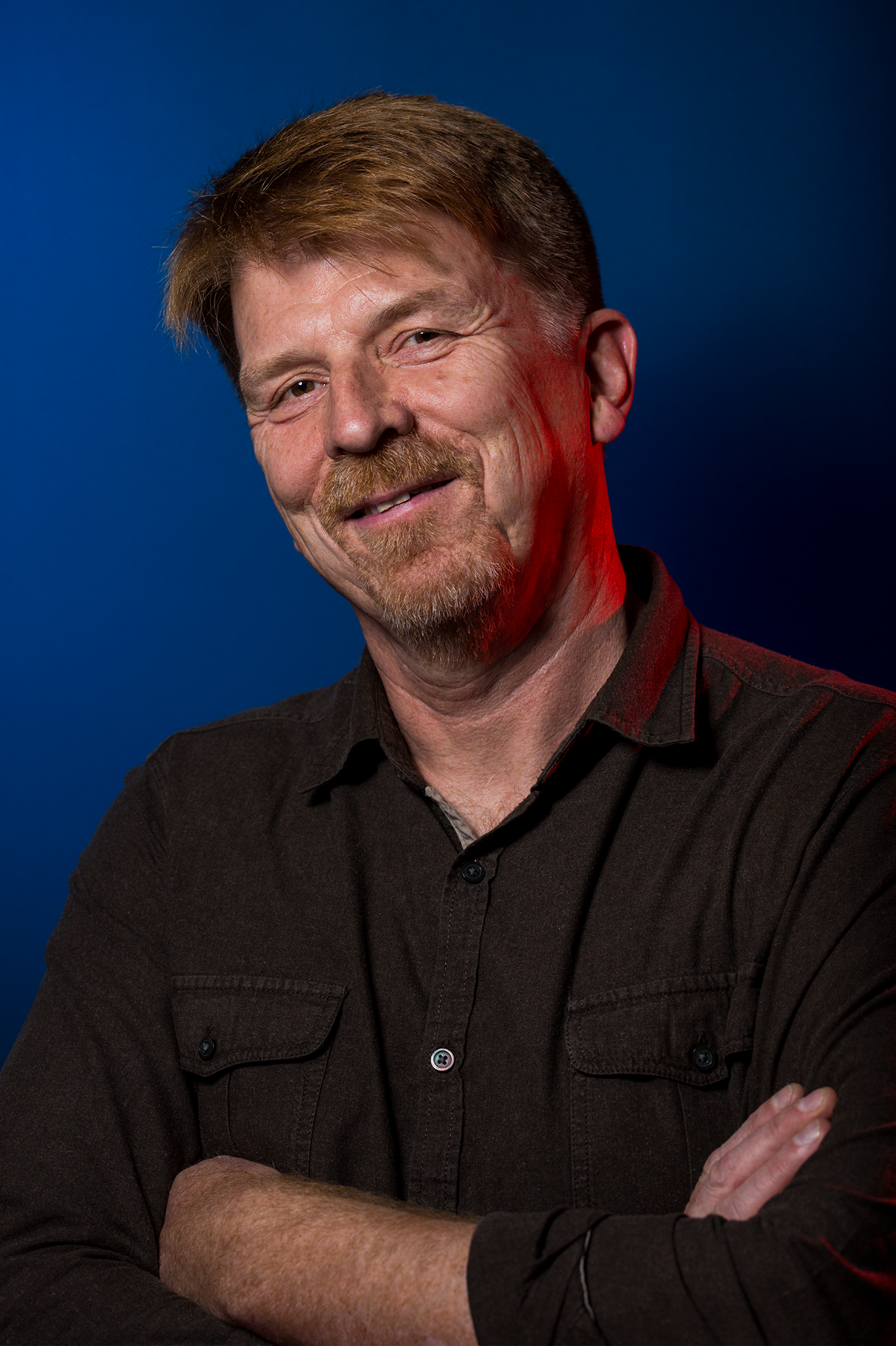
- Brown in 2020.
- Born: 20th century Glasgow, Scotland, U.K.
- Education: King's Park Secondary School; University of Strathclyde
- Occupations: novelist, marketing advisor
- Writing career
- Notable works: novels: Falling, 59 Minutes, The Catalyst, Meltdown
- Website: gordonjbrown.com

Gordon James Brown (born 20th century) is a Scottish writer of primarily crime fiction.

== Early life, education and early career ==
Brown attended King's Park Secondary School in Glasgow, before graduating from the University of Strathclyde.

Before publishing his novels, he previously worked with several companies, including e-comsport and Bass Export, and was the head of marketing at Tennent's Lager. He then set up Circuit Break, a company specialising in marketing strategy, planning and advice, and is also a director of Worn Out Limited as well as Brain Juice Limited.

== Literary career ==
Brown's first novel, Falling, was published in June 2009. Telling the story of a man who becomes involved in a life of crime that he did not wish to be part of, resulting in him being thrown from the roof of a building, it received positive reviews from The Herald and the Daily Record in Scotland.

Following the success of the first novel, a second, titled 59 Minutes, was released in September 2010. It once again received positive reviews.

Both Falling and 59 Minutes have been published by Fledgling Press.

The Catalyst, his third novel and the first starring Craig McIntyre, was released in May 2013. Following this, his fourth novel, Meltdown, was released in December 2014.

In 2016, Brown moved publisher to Strident Publishing, who took up the options on The Catalyst, Meltdown and the third, untitled book in the Craig McIntyre series. Working with Brown, Strident have completely re-worked the two original books and re-titled them. As a result, all three books were released as follows:

1. Darkest Thoughts – April 2017
2. Furthest Reaches – September 2017
3. Deepest Wounds – February 2018

In the U.S., Down & Out Books picked up the rights to Falling and published it in 2016. The sequel, Falling Too, was commissioned for publication in the U.S. in September 2017.

In March 2019, Brown released a fourth instalment in the McIntyre series, Highest Lives, published by Strident.

Brown has also been published in the Blood on the Bayou anthology to celebrate Bouchercon 2016.

In late 2019, Brown was signed to Polygon Books, an imprint of Birlinn Limited for a new crime thriller called Thirty-One Bones, set in the fictional town of El Descaro in Spain – to be published on 11 June 2020.

In addition, Brown had an on-line episodic, 15,000-word story, written in conjunction with writer Douglas Skelton, published by Polygon in May 2020.

In November 2021, Brown signed a two-book deal with Red Dog Press to publish two new crime novels under the name Gordon J. Brown. The first, Any Day Now was published on 9th Sept 2022 with the second, 'No More Games' due early 2023.

In May 2022, Six Wounds, the second in the Daniella Coulstoun series was published by Polygon.

Under the pseudonym of Morgan Cry, Gordon's agent, Francesca Riccardi, struck a new two-book deal with Severn House for two crime books set on the north east shoulder of Scotland in the town of Fraserburgh. The first book in the Blake Glover crime series, called The Cost, was published on 1 April 2025 and the second, called The Fracture, was to be released on 4 November 2025.

In 2026 Gordon struck a new four book deal with Severn House, now part of Joffe Books for two more in the Blake Glover crime series (to be published in 2028 - The Toil and The Bodykeeper) and two books in a new historical crime series set in Scotland in 1662. Called the Bloody Mackenzie Mysteries the historical books will be published in 2026 and 2027 - Dark Accords on November 4th 2026 and It Will Never Be Over in May 2027.

Gordon, as Morgan Cry, also published an anthology of twelve short stories, curated from many years of his writing, called Short Stories from a Dark Corner. It was released as an eBook on the 22 July 2025.

=== List of works ===
Year	Novel
2009	Falling
2010	59 Minutes
2013	The Catalyst
2014	Meltdown
2016	Falling (U.S.)
2017	Darkest Thoughts
2017	Furthest Reaches
2017	Falling Too
2018	Deepest Wounds
2019	Highest Lives
2020	Thirty-One Bones
2021	Six Wounds
2022	Any Day Now
2022	No More Games
2025	The Cost
2025	The Fracture
2025	Short Stories from a Dark Corner (short-story collection)

== Personal life ==
Brown has a post-graduate diploma in management studies and an MBA. He lives in Glasgow with his wife, but splits his time between the U.K. and Spain. He was one of the founders of Bloody Scotland, a Scottish crime-writer's festival, which has been held annually in Stirling since 2012.

== See also ==
- List of crime fiction writers
- List of pen names
- List of people from Glasgow
- List of Scottish novelists
- List of short story writers
- List of University of Strathclyde people
