= Sidhnak Mahar Inamdar =

Indian dalit soldier (18th century)

Sidhnak Mahar Inamdar, also known as Sidhnak Mahar, (18th century to 19th century) was an Indian soldier of the Mahar Regiment. He belonged to the Mahar caste. He is popularly known for the Battle of Koregaon.

== Early life ==
Sidhnak Mahar's grandfather was gifted Kalambi village of Satara as Inaam by Chhatrapati Shahu Maharaj, after escaping from Mughal captivity and returning to Maharashtra, for his loyalty and help after the death of Sambhaji Maharaj. So Sidhnak Mahar also got this Inaam as hereditary property. He further gained fame after the Battle of Kharda where he shown his Valour to Peshwa Madhavrao II during the battle with Nizam.

== Memorial ==
Sidhnak Mahar's memorial Samadhi is situated in Kalambi village of Sangli district. Veer Shidhnak Foundation is a welfare trust run by his descendants Abhijeet Inamdar in Kalambi Tal.Miraj Sangli district.

Bollywood actor Arjun Rampal plays the role of Sidhnak Mahar Inamdar in The Battle of Bhima Koregaon, an upcoming biopic.
