= Anem =

Anem may refer to:

- Anem (ancient city), a city mentioned in the Bible
- Anêm language, a language of Papua New Guinea

== See also ==
- Anam (disambiguation)
- Anim (disambiguation)
- Ganim (disambiguation)
