= Swails =

Swails is a surname. Notable people with the name include:

- Marsha Swails (born 1952), American teacher and former politician from Minnesota
- Stephen Atkins Swails (1832–1900), black Union Army officer and politician from South Carolina

== See also ==
- Swail, surname
- Swale (disambiguation)
