= Anam (name) =

Anam can be a given name or a surname. It is of Arabic origin and it means "blessed" .

The following are people with the name "Anam":

== Anam ==
- Anam Amin (born 1992), Pakistani cricketer
- Anam Hashim, Indian motorcycle stunt performer and rider
- Anam Kazim (born 1986), Canadian politician
- Anam Tanveer, Pakistani model and actress
- Anam Goher, Pakistani actress
- Anam Fayyaz, Pakistani television actress

== Makrani ==
- Anam Vivekananda Reddy, Indian politician
- Khalid Anam, Pakistani actor
- Mahfuz Anam (born 1950), Bangladeshi editor and publisher
- Shantanu Anam (born 1990), Indian writer and actor
- Stacy (singer), Malaysian singer born as Stracie Angie Anam
- Tahmima Anam (born 1975), British-Bangladeshi writer, novelist and columnist
- Tariq Anam Khan (born 1953), Bangladeshi actor, director, writer and producer

== See also ==
- Inaam
- Annam (disambiguation)
