= King's Park Secondary School =

Location
- 14 Fetlar Drive; Glasgow, Lanarkshire, G44 5BL; Scotland; 55.81377°N 4.246752°W

Information
- Type: Secondary
- Motto: Believe achieve (Former Motto: Video Meliora Petoque)
- Established: 1962
- Local authority: Glasgow City Council
- Head Teacher: Kirsty Ayed
- Staff: 100 Full-time staff
- Gender: Coeducational
- Age: 11 to 18
- Enrolment: 900
- Houses: Arran, Lewis, Mull, Skye
- Colours: blue, green
- Accreditations: SQA
- Feeder schools: Croftfoot Primary School, King's Park Primary School, Mount Florida Primary, Toryglen Primary School, and the catchment areas of the former Simshill Primary School and Holmlea Primary School (now part of Merrylee Primary School).
- Website: http://www.kingspark-sec.glasgow.sch.uk

King's Park Secondary School, on Fetlar Drive, in the King's Park area (or specifically in the Simshill area) of south Glasgow, is a Scottish non-denominational state school. It was established in 1962.

== Former pupils ==
- Gordon Brown, author
- Gerry Cinnamon, singer-songwriter
- Willie Donachie, footballer
- Bobby Gillespie, musician
- James Harkness, actor
- Rory Hughes, rugby player
- Ross Irwin, footballer
- Jane McCarry, actress
- Alan McGee, businessman, businessman
