= Swale =

Swale or Swales may refer to:

== Topography ==
- Swale (landform), a low tract of land
  - Bioswale, landform designed to remove silt and pollution
  - Swales, found in the formation of Hummocky cross-stratification

== Geography ==
- River Swale, in North Yorkshire, England
- The Swale, a channel separating mainland Kent from the Isle of Sheppey, England
  - Borough of Swale, a local government district in Kent, England
    - Swale railway station

== Other uses ==
- Swale (horse), an American Thoroughbred racehorse
- Swale (surname), people with the surname Swale
- Swales (surname), people with the surname Swales
- Swales Aerospace, a U.S. aerospace and defense company from 1978 to 2007, founded by Tom Swales
- Swale Vincent (1868–1933), British physiologist
