= Swales (surname) =

Swales is an English surname. It either derives from the River Swale or Swallow Hill. Notable people with the surname include:

- Alonzo Swales (1870–1952), British trade unionist
- Ian Swales (born 1953), English Liberal Democrat politician
- John Swales (1938–2025), English linguist
- John Douglas Swales (1935–2000), English physician
- Kim Swales (fl. from 1989), British economist
- Penelope Swales (fl. from 1993), Australian musician
- Peter Swales (1932–1996), chairman of Manchester City F.C.
- Peter Swales (1948–2022), Welsh historian
- Steve Swales (born 1973), English footballer
- Stuart Swales (fl. 1937–1938), English footballer
- Ted Swales (1915–1945), South African World War II pilot
- Tim Swales (born 1948), English motorcycle racer
