= Anim =

Anim or ANIM may refer to:

== Places ==
- A city in the mountains of Judah, now el-Ghuwein, near Eshtemoh, about 10 miles south-west of Hebron
- An alternative spelling for the biblical city of Anem, now Jenin
- Horvat 'Anim, an archaeological site in southern Israel

== People ==
- Anim Dankwah (born 2000), Canadian football player
- Cecilia Anim, president of the Royal College of Nursing
- Sacar Anim (born 1997), basketball player in the Israeli Basketball Premier League
- Vida Anim (born 1983), Ghanaian athlete

== Other uses ==
- Animation
- ANIM, a file format used to store digital movies and computer generated animations
- Anim languages, a language group of New Guinea
- Anim Publishing, an imprint of the German group VDM Publishing, devoted to the reproduction of Wikipedia content
- Acquired non-inflammatory myopathy, a neuromuscular disorder
- Afghanistan National Institute of Music

== See also ==
- Anem (disambiguation)
