= Doug Swail =

Canadian football player (born c. 1930)

Profile
- Position: Halfback

Personal information
- Born: c. 1930 (age 95–96)
- Listed height: 5 ft 10 in (1.78 m)
- Listed weight: 175 lb (79 kg)

Career history
- 1949–1950: Edmonton Eskimos

Doug Swail (born c. 1930) was a Canadian professional football player who played for the Edmonton Eskimos. He previously played junior football in Edmonton.
