= Nouf Marwaai =

Yoga instructor in Saudi Arabia

- نوف المروعي
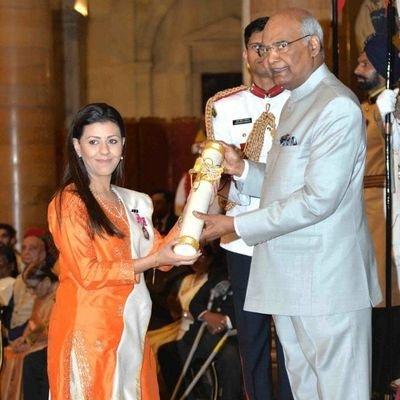
- Marwaai, receiving Padma Shri from President of India, Ramnath Kovind.
- Born: Nouf al-Marwaai; 1980 (age 45–46); Jeddah, Saudi Arabia
- Citizenship: Saudi Arabia
- Occupation: Yoga teacher
- Organization: Arab Yoga Foundation
- Father: Mohammad Marwaai
- Awards: Padma Shri (2018)

Nouf Marwaai (Arabic: نوف المروعي, romanized: nuaf almuruei; born: 1980) is a Yoga instructor in Saudi Arabia. She is the founder of the Arab Yoga Foundation in Saudi Arabia. Nouf Marwaai has contributed to the legalization of Yoga and to its receiving official recognition in Saudi Arabia. She was awarded India's fourth highest civilian award the Padma Shri in 2018.

== Introduction to Yoga ==
Nouf had been a sickly child and was diagnosed with systemic lupus at the age of 17. The doctors informed her parents that there wasn't much hope of her being cured. She read a Yoga book that her father had brought from his travels, and started practicing a few asanas. Over time as she continued practicing Yoga, her health improved, allowing her to graduate from college with high honors and she became a full time Yoga practitioner. In an interview, she said after starting Yoga and Ayurveda, she has lived 21 years without any medications.

== Arab Yoga Foundation ==
Nouf started teaching Yoga in 2004, in Jeddah as the Saudi Arabia Yoga School. In 2010, the name was changed to Arab Yoga Foundation because the practice of Yoga had spread to other Arab countries as well. In June 2017, due to the efforts of Nouf and the Foundation, the General Sports Authority of Saudi Arabia gave its approval for Yoga Day Celebrations. As of 2019, the Arab Yoga Foundation has taught Yoga to over 10,000 people and has over 700 yoga teachers across different cities of the Kingdom of Saudi Arabia.
