= Anam Hashim =

Indian street-bike athlete

- Born: May 1995 (age 31); Lucknow, Uttar Pradesh
- Occupations: Entrepreneur, Professional Streetbike Freestyle Athlete, Now Cross Country Rally Racer
- Years active: 2013 - 2024

Anam Hashim was an Indian professional streetbike freestyle athlete. She is the only Indian stunt athlete to win an international stunt competition in 2017. She is known as the first woman who rode to Khardung La on a TVS Scooty alone and also led a group of 10 women to Khardungla in 2016 during the Himalayan Highs. She made her debut in Cross Country Rally Racing at Desert Storm 2019 and was preparing for 2021 race season.
