= Rachel Wynberg =

South African biopiracy scientist

Rachel P. Wynberg
- Education: University of Cape Town; University of Strathclyde
- Occupation: Biopiracy scientist

Rachel P. Wynberg is a South African biodiversity researcher and natural scientist who is a professor at the department of Environmental and Geography Sciences at the University of Cape Town.

== Life and work ==
=== Education ===
At the University of Cape Town, Wynberg earned a BSc in zoology, MSc in marine biology and a MPhil in environmental science. She went on to obtain a PhD in environmental science at the University of Strathclyde in Scotland.

=== Research ===
She advises governments, civil organisations and international agencies and is actively involved with policy debates and initiatives throughout southern Africa. Her work concerns the taking and using of biological entities from indigenous people without proper acknowledgement or compensation. Specifically, "Biopiracy is the misappropriation of traditional knowledge and biodiversity through the patent system... It's been prevalent for centuries in Southern Africa".

One instance that she has cited concerned the San people.

An African example of biopiracy is the case of the Hoodia succulent plant, which grows in the Kalahari Desert. For generations the San people have used it as an appetite and thirst suppressant. But in 1996 the South African Council for Scientific and Industrial Research (CSIR) isolated the hunger-suppressing chemical component in Hoodia and patented it. The CSIR licensed the UK-based Phytopharm for further development. None of the projected royalties were earmarked for the San. In fact, a Phytopharm spokesperson said that the CSIR had led him to believe that the San people were "extinct". In a victory against biopiracy, the CSIR eventually signed an agreement to recognise and reward the San as holders of traditional knowledge.

Wynberg chaired part of the First International Meeting Against Biopiracy, held at the French National Assembly in Paris and attended by representatives from 15 countries including indigenous groups, attorneys, academic researchers and entrepreneurs. The goal of the meeting was to explore the complexities of biopiracy and the threat it poses to cultural and biological diversity. The meeting was hosted by a group of French non-governmental organisations, under the leadership of the former first lady of France, Danielle Mitterrand.

== Distinctions ==
Wynberg was elected a member of the Academy of Science of South Africa in 2018.

== Selected publications ==
- Wynberg, R. (2002). "A decade of biodiversity conservation and use in South Africa: tracking progress from the Rio Earth Summit to the Johannesburg World Summit on Sustainable Development". South African Journal of Science. 98 (5): 233–243.
- Wynberg, R. (2004). "Rhetoric, realism and benefit‐sharing: Use of traditional knowledge of Hoodia species in the development of an appetite suppressant". The Journal of World Intellectual Property. 7 (6): 851–876.
- Wynberg, R.; Schroeder, D.; Chennells, R. (2009). Indigenous peoples, consent and benefit sharing: Lessons from the San-Hoodia case. Berlin: Springer. pp. 69–86.
- Wynberg, R.; Hauck, M. (2014). "People, power, and the coast: a conceptual framework for understanding and implementing benefit sharing". Ecology and Society. 19 (1)..
- Laird, S.; Wynberg, R.; Rourke, M.; Humphries, F.; Muller, M. R.; Lawson, C. (2020). "Rethink the expansion of access and benefit sharing". Science. 367 (6483): 1200–1202.
