= Inaam =

Inaam or Inam (Arabic: إنعام) means gift. The name is mainly given to Muslims. It may be used as a given name for a person. It is mainly used in compound forms such as Inam-ul-Haq / Enamul Haque. The name is subject to varying transliterations such as Inaam, Enam and other forms.

Notable bearers of the uncompounded name include:

== Female ==
- Ina'am Al-Mufti (1929–2018), first Jordanian woman to hold a governmental position
- Inaam Kachachi (born 1942), Iraqi journalist and author
- Enaam Elgretly (born 1944), Egyptian actress

== Male ==
- Enaam Ahmed (born 2000), British racing driver
- Enam Ahmed Chowdhury (1937–2025), Bangladeshi civil servant
- Enam Ali (1960–2022), Bangladeshi-born British businessman
- Enaam Arnaout (born 1962), Syrian American who used charitable donations to support fighters in Bosnia without informing the donors
- Inam Ahmed (1922–2003), Bangladeshi actor

== See also ==
- Alexis Enam (born 1986), Cameroonian footballer
- Anam (name)
- Enam (disambiguation)
- Inamdar, feudal title before and during British Raj
