= Annam =

Annam was a name for Vietnam used until 1945. Its usage varies depending on the time period and context.

- Đại Việt, Việt Nam, Đại Nam – official names of the country at different times
- Annam (French protectorate), a subdivision of French Indochina, used as an exonym; now the central region of Vietnam
- Annan (Tang protectorate), the southernmost province of Imperial China between 679–866, now northern Vietnam
- Annamite Range, a mountain range in Laos and Vietnam

== Other uses ==
- Nachiarkoil lamp or Annam lamp, an ornate brass oil lamp made in India
- Annam (Dungeons & Dragons), a character in Dungeons & Dragons role-playing universe
- SAS Tafelberg, Danish tanker originally named Annam

== See also ==
- Anam (disambiguation)
