= Swale (surname) =

Swale is a surname. Notable people with the surname include:

- Edwin Swale (1899–1978), English First World War flying ace
- Jessica Swale (born 1982), English theatre director
- Rosie Swale-Pope (born 1946), British author and adventurer
- Solomon Swale (1610–1678), English politician
