= K M Baharul Islam =

Director of the Institute of Management Technology in Hyderabad, India

Professor K M Baharul Islam FRAS
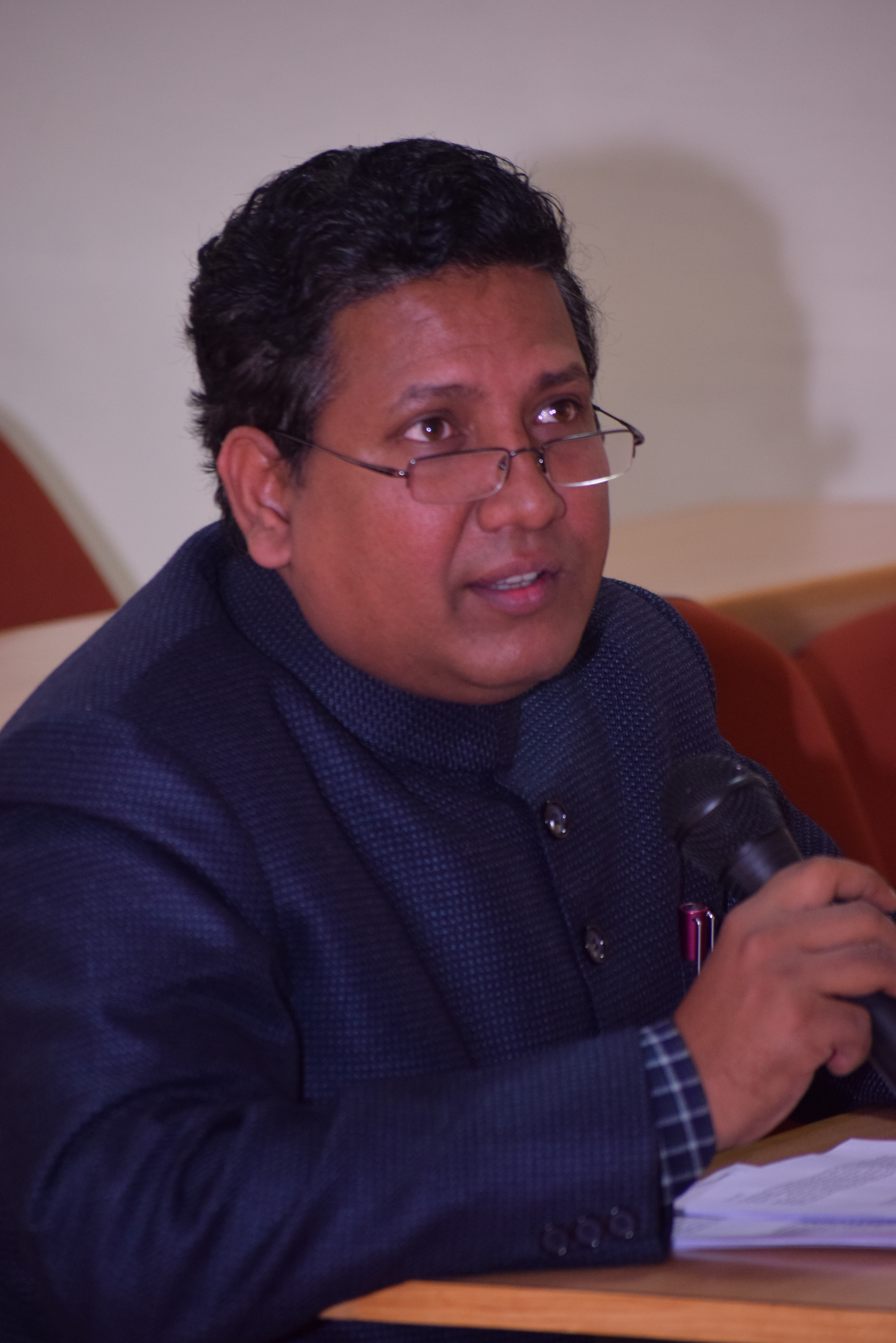
- Islam speaking at the Media and Public Policy Conf at IIM Kashipur, India on 21 January 2016
- Occupations: Professor and Director, Institute of Management Technology Hyderabad, India

Academic background
- Education: D.Litt., PhD (Double), MA, MBA, LLM, BEd, LLB, Post-doctorate.
- Alma mater: University of Strathclyde; Asian Institute of Technology, Bangkok; Gauhati University; Assam Don Bosco University; Aligarh Muslim University; Tezpur University; Assam University; I. K. Gujral Punjab Technical University; Kumaun University
- Thesis: (1) Use of Technology in ELT Classrooms (2) Transitional Justice in Post Peace Agreement Situations
- Doctoral advisor: Prof Madan Mohan Sharma, Prof Subhram Rajkhowa

Academic work
- Institutions: Indian Institute of Advanced Study; Indian Institute of Management Kashipur; National Institute of Technology, Silchar; Addis Ababa University; National Council of Educational Research and Training
- Main interests: Development communication Public Policy; Media studies Film industry Public service Interest Free Economy
- Notable works: Green MBA Program in South Asia
- Notable ideas: Revenge of the cradle

K M Baharul Islam is presently the Director, Institute of Management Technology Hyderabad, India. He was a Professor and the Chairperson of Centre of Excellence in Public Policy and Government at Indian Institute of Management Kashipur from July 2012 to Jan 2025. He served as the Dean (Academics) during 2019–2021 at the same institute. He was elected as a Fellow of the Royal Asiatic Society of Great Britain and Ireland on 18 March 2020. Since October 2021, he is a visiting professor at the London School of Economics.

== Appointments ==
During 2016-2018 he was a Fellow at the Indian Institute of Advanced Study, Shimla, India where he worked on Translingualism and Migration. He specialises in the areas of Development Program Evaluations, Policy Analysis, Institutional Development, ICT Policies and e-Government in Asia and Africa. Prof Islam holds the position of Professor of Communications at Indian Institute of Management Kashipur. He was a member of the Board of Governors of Indian Institute of Management Kashipur (2019–2021) and the Academic Council of Aligarh Muslim University (2021–2025).

He is a Fellow at the US India Policy Institute in Washington DC. He has been awarded Shastri Institutional Collaborative Research Grant (2018–20) by Shastri Indo-Canadian Institute for the project on "Gender Diversity in Boardrooms and Business Schools" in collaboration with Rupa Banerjee of Ryerson University (now Toronto Metropolitan University), Canada. He has also been sanctioned an action research scheme project on Continuing Legal Education by the Ministry of Law and Justice, Government of India (2018–2019). His conducted a Bangladesh-India study on "Co-deployment of Optical Fiber Cables along the Asian Highways and Trans-Asian Railways for E-resilience" under the Asia-Pacific Information Superhighway initiative of the United Nations' Economic and Social Commission for Asia and the Pacific (UNESCAP), Bangkok.

Islam was selected as an International Fellow at the King Abdullah International Center for Interreligious and Intercultural Dialogue in Vienna, popularly known as KAICIID Dialogue Centre for 2015–2016. He served as the chairman and CEO of the South Asia Development Gateway set up by the Development Gateway from 2007 to 2012. He studied for his first BA and MA at the Aligarh Muslim University. He completed his 2nd and 3rd post-graduate bachelor's degrees in education (BEd) and law (LLB) from Assam University. He did his PhD on "New Technologies for English Language Classrooms" from Tezpur University, India. He did LLM (IT & Telecom Law) at the Strathclyde Law School, University of Strathclyde with a UK Telecom Academy Fellowship. He did his post-doctoral studies on Internet-based instructions at Asian Institute of Technology, Bangkok. Islam completed his MBA from I. K. Gujral Punjab Technical University and a second PhD in Transitional justice from Assam Don Bosco University, Guwahati. In April, 2023, Dr Islam received a D.Litt. in English from Kumaun University, India for his thesis titled "Death of English in the Age of the Internet: Quality issues in English Language Teaching from Academia-Industry Perspective." He is an alumnus of Harvard Business School, GLOCOLL (2013-14 Batch). and University of Bern, IPDET (2018 Batch).

Prof Islam led a major regional capacity building program called "Environmental Assessment Capacity Building in South Asia" funded by World Bank during 2014–2016. Under the project he planned and successfully piloted a Green MBA Specialization within the post-graduate program in management as Indian Institute of Management Kashipur. He was the principal Investigator for the project on "Performance Indicators for Subordinate Courts and Suggestive Policy / Procedural Changes to Reduce Civil Case Pendency" funded by Ministry of Law & Justice, Government of India project under research in Judicial reform scheme. He was the Project Director for a major research project on Communication Strategy for Disaster management in Uttarakhand state in India. Communication is one of the key issues during any emergency, and pre-planning of communications is critical. Miscommunication can easily result in emergency events escalating unnecessarily. This is a major project funded by the Indian Council of Social Science Research after the 2013 North India floods.

== Career ==
He started his career as a faculty in Humanities at National Institute of Technology, Silchar where he taught from 1994 to 2002. The institute was formerly known as Regional Engineering College, Silchar. He initiated and headed the Center for Educational Technology at the National Institute of Technology Silchar, India where he taught for eight years. He was part of the faculty during the initial years of development of Kigali Institute of Science, Technology & Management (KIST), Rwanda (2000–2001) which is now known as College of Science and Technology.

Islam also worked as a Reader at the National Council of Educational Research and Training, New Delhi (2002). In 2002–2003, Baharul Islam was seconded to the Addis Ababa University as an associate professor. To serve the grassroots communities, Islam initiated an NGO in Assam, India called PFI Foundation, and served as its Honorary Executive Director. While working for the Foundation, he received two Certificates of Recognition from World Bank Development Marketplace Award in 2003 and 2007 for his projects on the Education of Disabled Children in Ethiopia and Mobile Eye Care Clinic in Northeast India respectively.

Baharul Islam worked earlier as an ICT Policy & eGovernment Consultant at the United Nations Economic Commission for Africa (UNECA), Addis Ababa and United Nations Economic and Social Commission for Asia and the Pacific (UNESCAP), Bangkok. He has been involved in various UN projects in Asia and Africa in countries including Cambodia, Rwanda, Ethiopia, The Gambia, Ghana, Uganda, Kenya, Sudan, Egypt, Tanzania and Sierra Leone. His publications include e -Government Strategy for the Gambia (published by UNECA) and a National ICT Policy called NICI Policy and Plans for The Gambia commissioned by UNECA. He wrote a chapter in the Digital Encyclopedia on ICT & Economic Development. He was registered as an Advocate by the Bar Council of India in 2004 and enrolled as member of the Bar Association at the Gauhati High Court.

== Selected publications ==
- Islam, K.M. Baharul; Roy, Nandita (2015). New Directions in Media. Bloomsbury India. ASIN 9384898813.
- Islam, K. M. Baharul, ed. (11 April 2016). Issues in Women's Rights: A Practitioners' Resource Book. Allied Publishers Ltd. ASIN 8184249101.
- Islam, K M B; Raushan, A (2016). Public Policy Agenda: Decrypting Sustainability for India. Bloomsbury.
- Islam, K M B; Iftekhar, S. N (2017). Educational Policy Reforms: National Perspective. Bloomsbury. Archived from the original on 12 June 2017.
- Singh, Nitin (2017). "Predictive Analytics for Reducing Human-Animal Conflict" (PDF). International Journal of Development and Conflict. 7: 81–96.
- Dee, Juliet, ed. (1 January 2018). From Tahrir Square to Ferguson. doi:10.3726/978-1-4539-1757-2. ISBN 9781433139642.
- Khan, Asif; Mitra, Archan (2018). "Exploring the Status of Community Information and Training for Disaster Preparation and Mitigation Practices: An Appraisal of 2013 Flash Flood in Uttarakhand". International Journal of Emergency Management.
- Literature from North-East India: Beyond the Centre-Periphery Debate. Routledge. 2022. ISBN 9781032425689.
- Bell, Arthur H.; Smith, Dayle M. (2022). Management Communication. Wiley Pub. ISBN 9789354642388.
- Migrant Muse: The Third Space in Assamese Literature. Shimla: Indian Institute of Advanced Study. 2023. ISBN 978-93-82396-85-7.

== Gallery ==
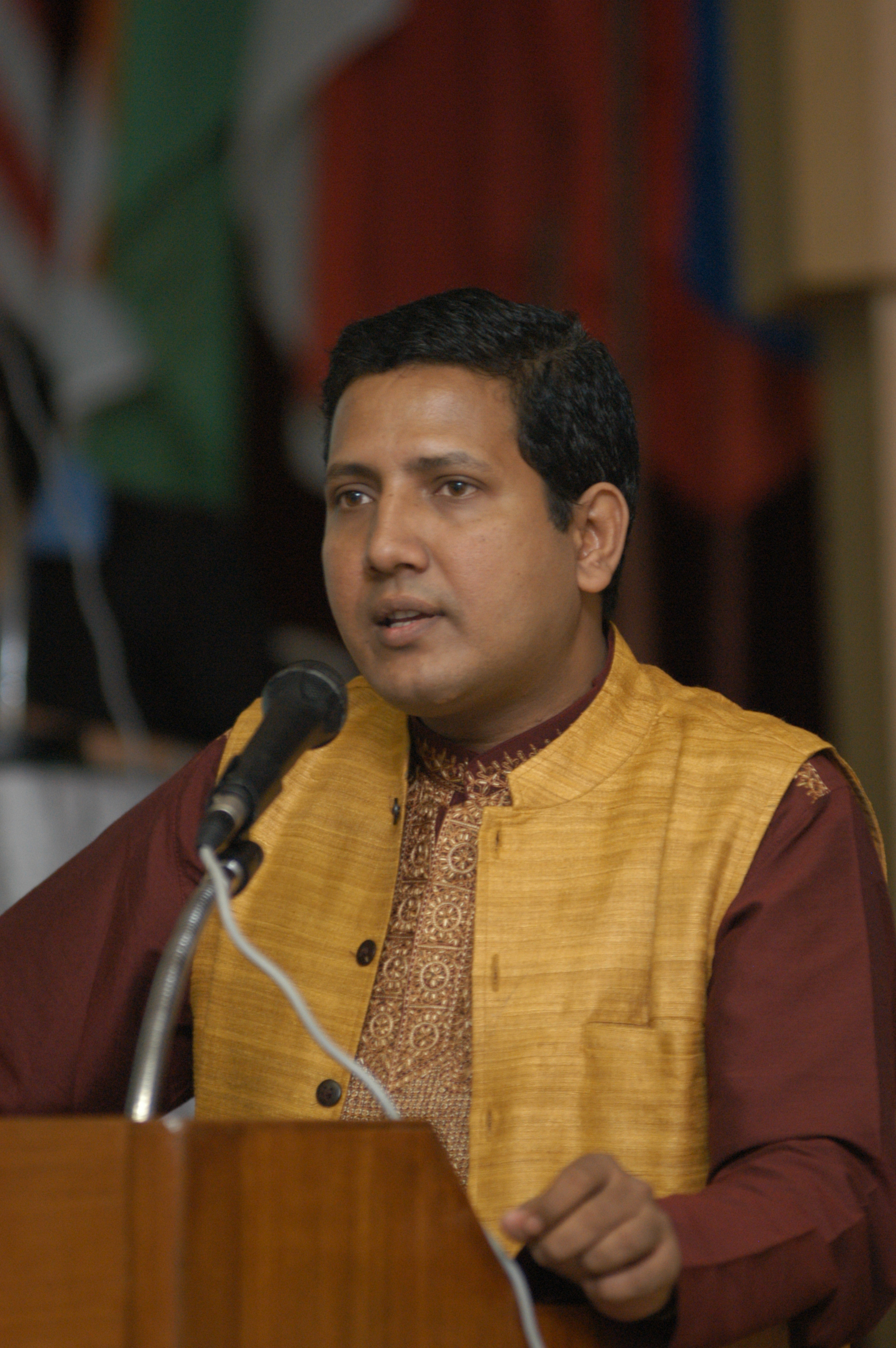
Baharul Islam Speaking at Bangkok Inter-Cultural Conference 2008

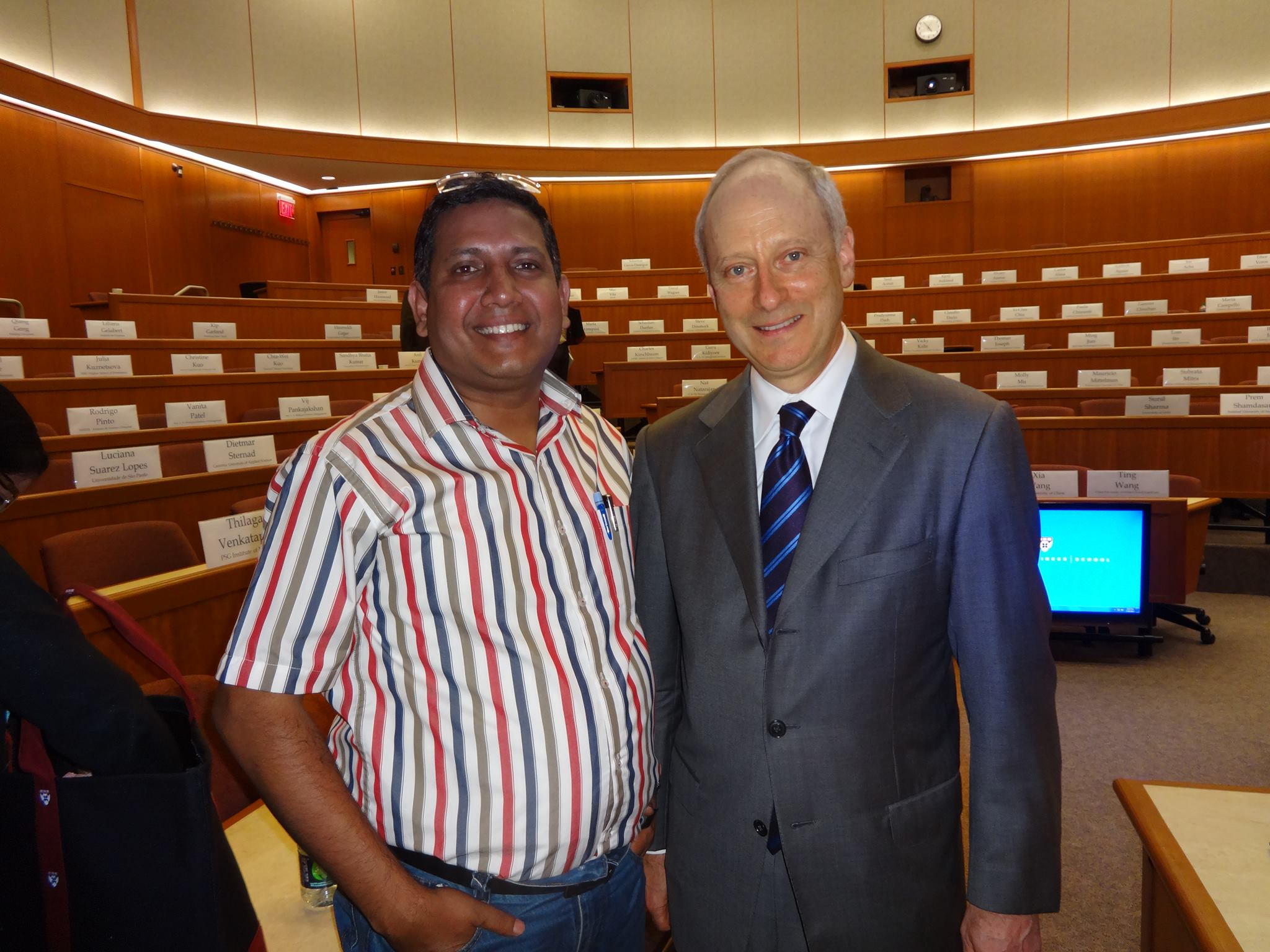
Prof Baharul Islam with Prof Michael J. Sandel at Harvard Business School during the GLOCOLL Class (July 2013)

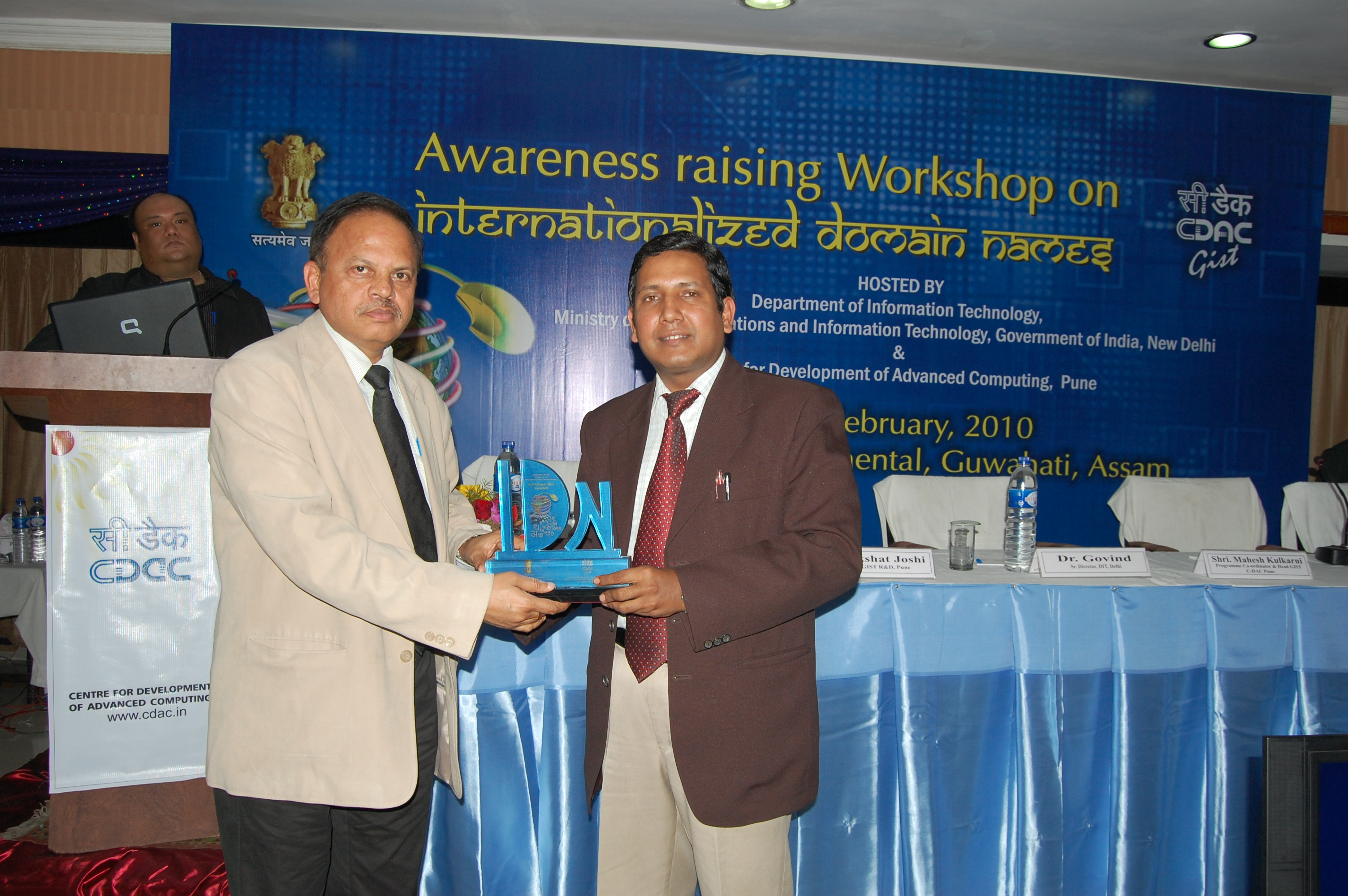
Baharul Islam being handed over a Dept of IT memento at a Govt of India function at Guwahati (India) Feb 2010

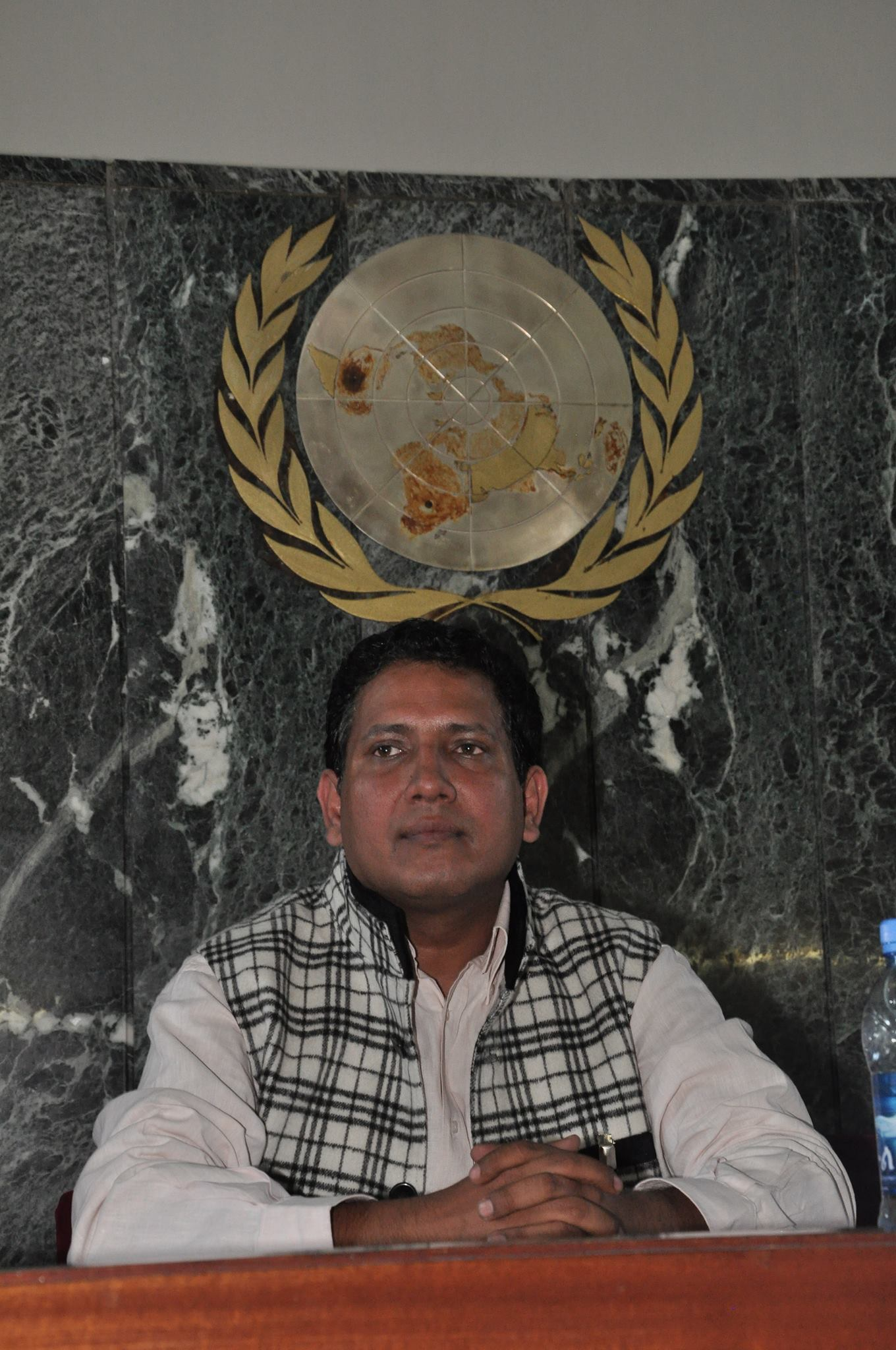
Prof Baharul Islam at the African Economic Conference 2009, United Nations Economic Commission for Africa, Addis Ababa

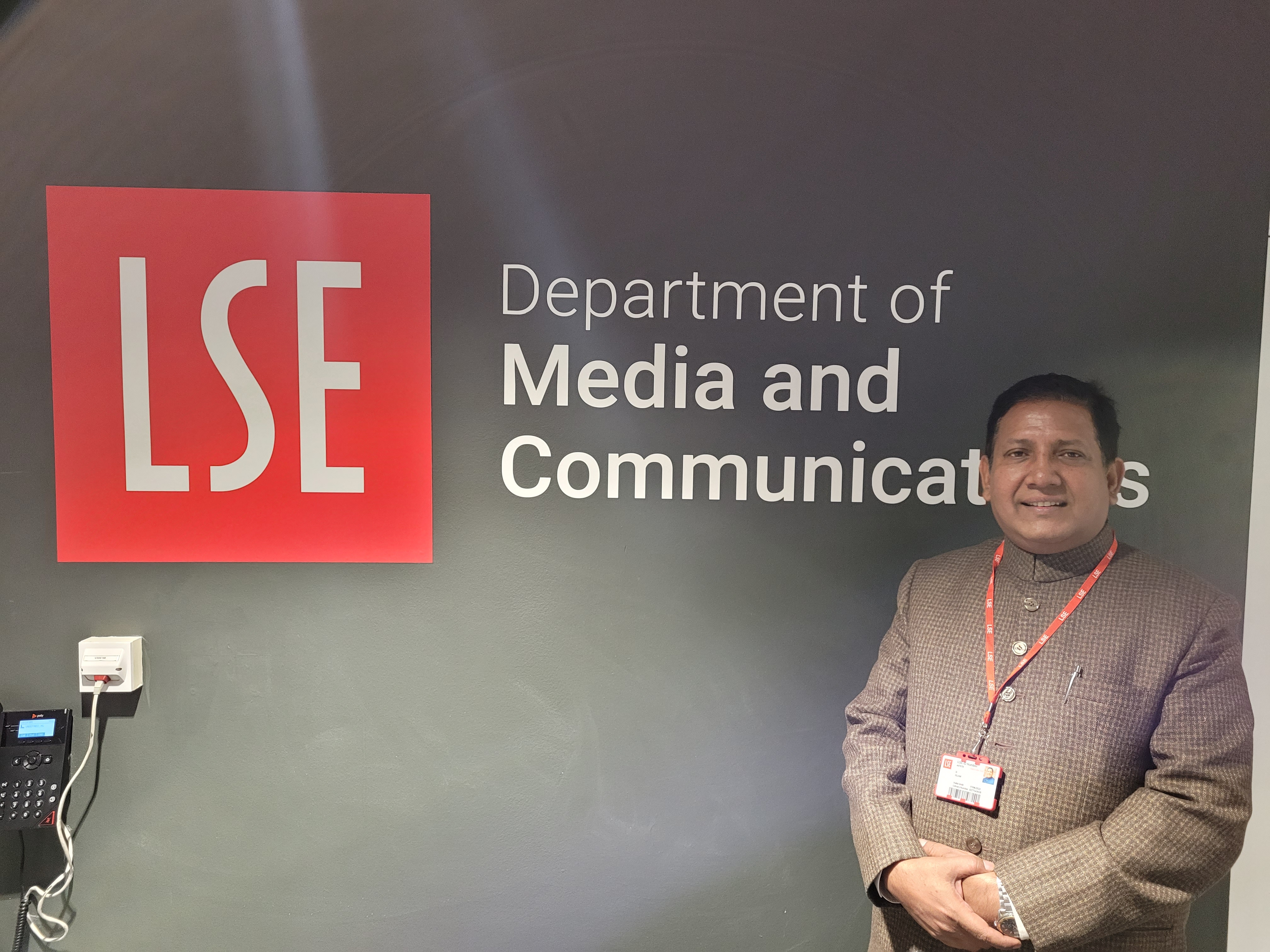
Baharul Islam at the Dept of Media and Communications, London School of Economics, May 2022.

== See also ==
- Emergency management#Communicating and incident assessment
- Karimganj
- List of Aligarh Muslim University alumni
