= Khardung La =

Mountain pass in Ladakh, India

- Tibetan: མཁར་གདོང་ལ་
- Location within Ladakh Location within India
- Elevation: 5,359 m (17,582 ft)

Location
- Location: Ladakh, India
- Range: Ladakh Range
- Coordinates: 34°16′42″N 77°36′15″E

Khardung La (Tibetan: མཁར་གདོང་ལ་, Wylie: mkhar gdong la, THL: khar dong la) or Khardung Pass (elevation 5,359 m (17,582 ft)), 40 km (25 mi) north of Leh city, is a mountain pass in the Leh district of the union territory of Ladakh in India.

The pass is on the Ladakh Range and connects the Indus river valley and the Shyok river valley. A strategically important motorable road from Leh in the south, built in 1976 by the Border Roads Organisation (BRO), connects to the Nubra Valley in north and also to the Siachen Glacier. The road is one of the world's highest motorable roads.

== History ==
Khardong La is historically important as it lies on the major caravan route from Leh to Kashgar in Central Asia. About 10,000 horses and camels used to take the route annually, and a small population of Bactrian camels can still be seen at Hunder, in the area north of the pass. During World War II there was an attempt to transfer war material to China through this route.

In the early 1950s, William O. Douglas described "the trail, after crossing the Indus, divides, one fork going south along the river's edge to Spitok, Khalatse and Khargil, the other turning north to Leh, the Khardong Pass (...), and Yarkand, an ancient trading center of Sinkiang. ... Leh is on a historic caravan route that leads not only to Yarkand in Sinkiang but to Lhasa in Tibet. (...) the stream of trade. Wool, silver, felts, tea, candy, skins, velvets, silk, gold, carpets, musk, coral, borax, jade cups, salt came down from the north. Cotton goods, shawls, brocades, opium, indigo, plumes, shoes, pearls, ginger, cloves, pepper, honey, tobacco, sugar cane, barley rice, wheat, corn came up from the south."

== Location ==
The nearest sizable town is Leh. The two bases on either side of Khardung La are North Pullu and South Pullu.

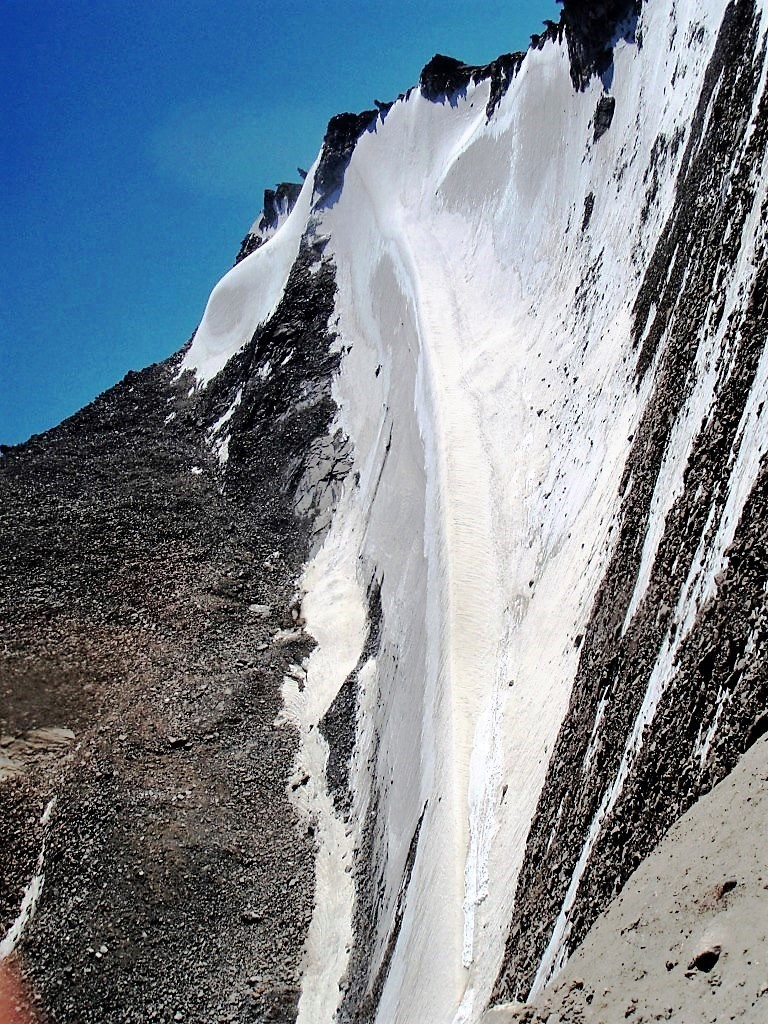
Peak above Khardung La.

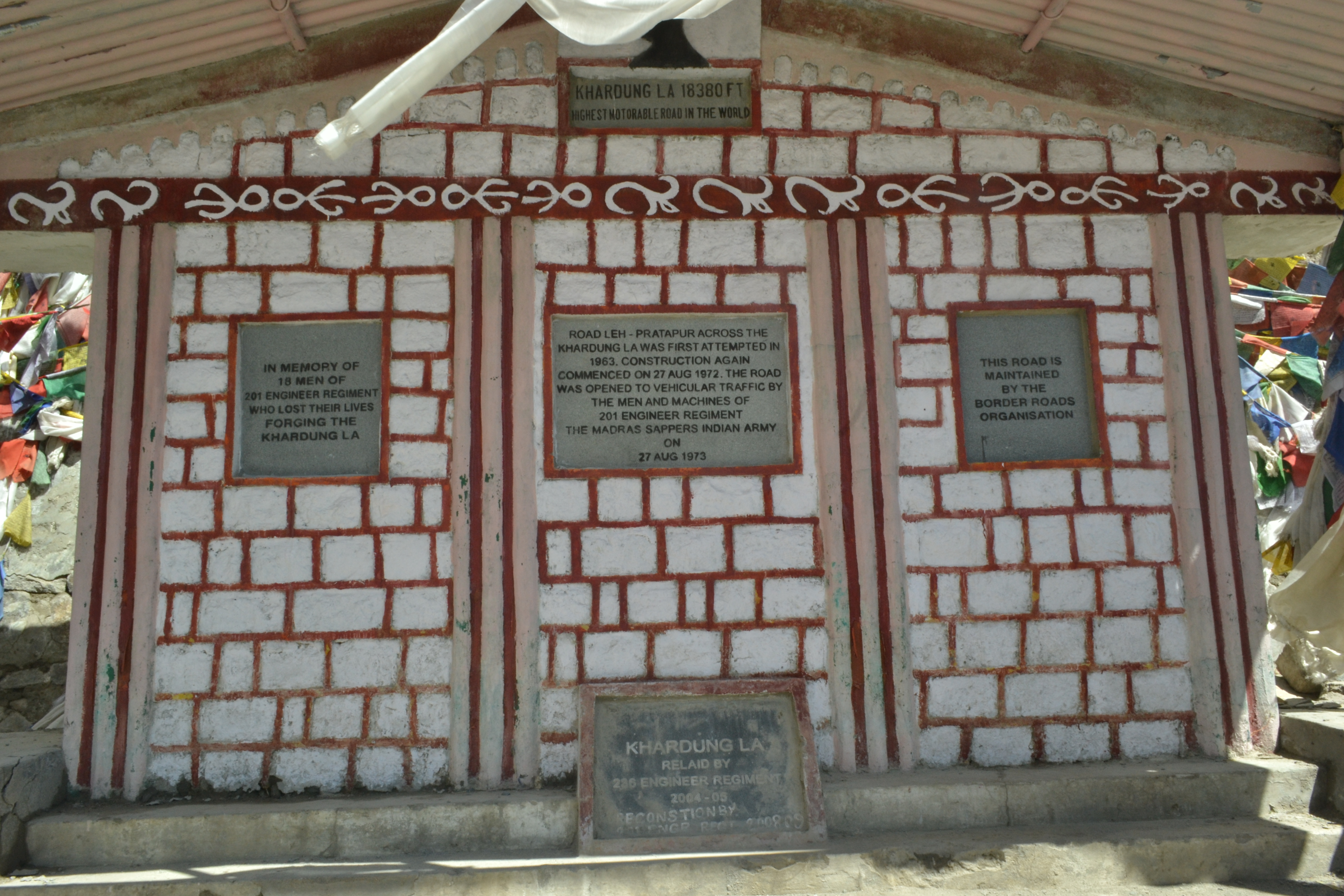
A memorial at Khardung La.

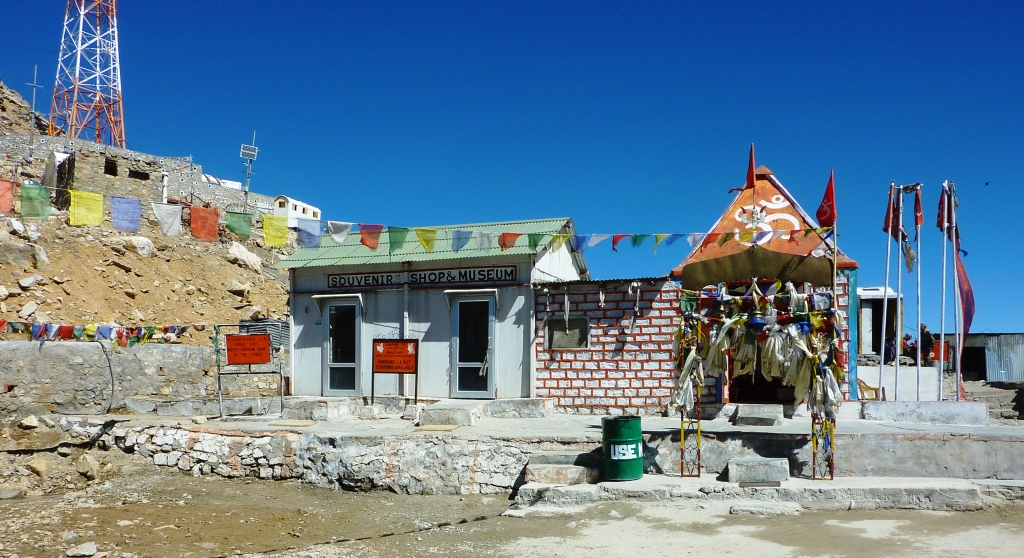
Khardung La office and souvenir shop.

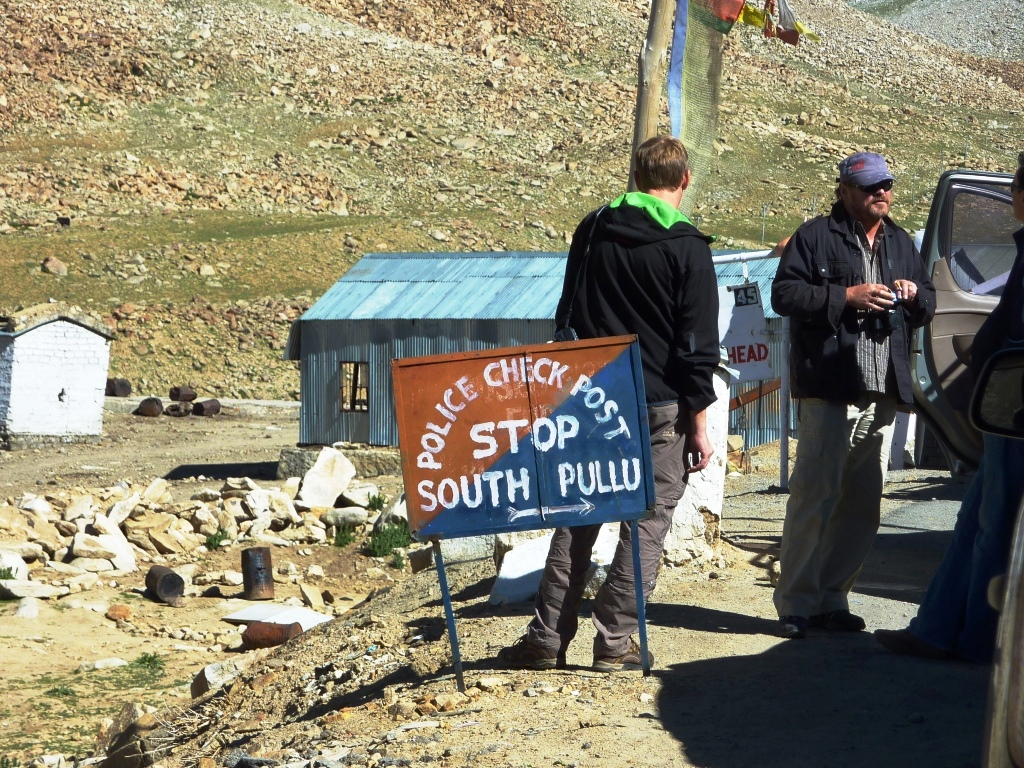
Police Check Post at South Pullu Pass at the southern end of Khardung La.

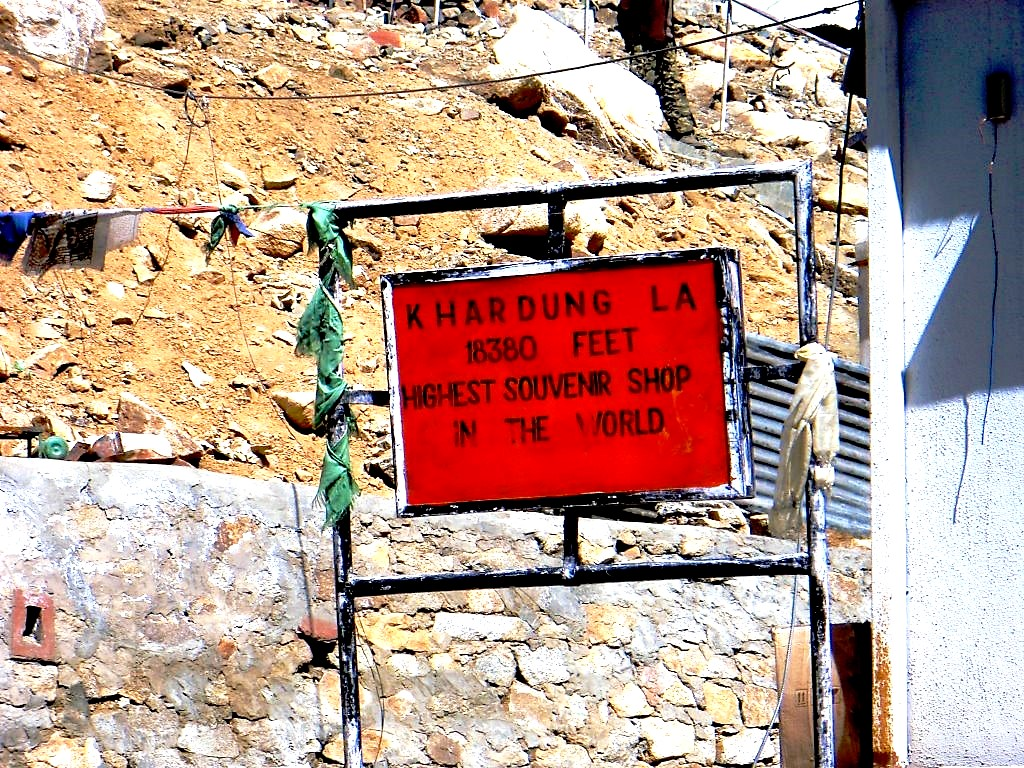
Sign "Khardung La - Highest Souvenir Shop in the World".

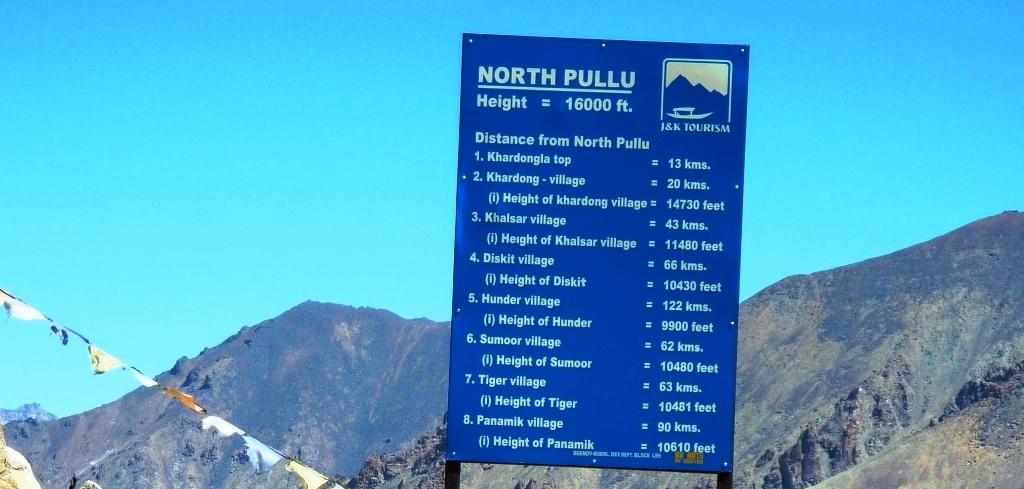
North Pullu sign at the northern end of Khardung La.

== Climate ==
Khardung La has an arctic tundra climate (ET) with short, cool summers and long, very cold winters.

Climate data for Khardung La
Month	Jan	Feb	Mar	Apr	May	Jun	Jul	Aug	Sep	Oct	Nov	Dec	Year
Mean daily maximum °C (°F)	−19 (−2)	−18 (0)	−14 (7)	−11 (12)	−5 (23)	1 (34)	7 (45)	7 (45)	1 (34)	−8 (18)	−14 (7)	−18 (0)	−8 (19)
Mean daily minimum °C (°F)	−36 (−33)	−34 (−29)	−31 (−24)	−25 (−13)	−15 (5)	−9 (16)	−6 (21)	−6 (21)	−10 (14)	−18 (0)	−25 (−13)	−31 (−24)	−20 (−5)
Average precipitation mm (inches)	29 (1.1)	41 (1.6)	53 (2.1)	38 (1.5)	28 (1.1)	9 (0.4)	9 (0.4)	8 (0.3)	8 (0.3)	8 (0.3)	13 (0.5)	22 (0.9)	266 (10.5)

== Transport ==
Khardung La is 40 km (24–25 mi) by road from Leh, from where a daily bus service to Nubra Valley passes over Khardung La which may also be reached by a hired car with an experienced driver or by motorcycle.

Khardung La Road, from Leh to Nubra Valley and Siachen, runs over the Khardung La. Since its construction, part of the India–China Border Roads (ICBR), the route has served as a vital artery for the Indian Army to maintain supplies to the Siachen Glacier and as a primary conduit for high-altitude tourism in the Ladakh region. The road is often subject to long delays due to traffic congestion on narrow one-lane sections, washouts, avalanches and road accidents, but with no permanent winter closure. Updates on road conditions can be found at the official Leh site. While the Border Roads Organisation (BRO) under Project Himank has significantly improved the surface, the high-altitude section near the summit remains subject to extreme weather, causing occasional road degradation such as slush and potholes. The road approaching the Nubra Valley is generally well-maintained, though travelers must account for potential washouts or falling rocks. The route is regularly used by heavy military trucks, hired 4x4 vehicles, and motorcycles.

Khardung La Tunnel, planned 5.5 km long road tunnel to be built by BRO of which the DPR (detailed project report) was already ready in 2026, will reduce the travel time and protect the Khardung Glacier from the vehicular traffic while ensuring the glacier-dependent water supply to the Leh city. As of March 2026, BRO has completed the DPR (detailed project report), project is now awaiting funding from the central Ministry of Defence budget to issue construction tenders, after which construction will take nearly 4 years. See also See also Tunnels in North West India.

Kushok Bakula Rimpochee Airport (IATA: IXL) at Leh is the nearest airport. Located approximately 39–41 km (24–25 mi) south of the Khardung pass, the airport serves as the primary gateway for travelers and military logistics entering the Ladakh Range. Daily flights are operated from Delhi.

Bhanupli–Leh line, under-construction, will have a station at Leh 35 km south of Khardung La.

== Tourism ==
All non-local travelers are required to obtain an Inner Line Permit (ILP) and pay the Ladakh Environment Fee via the official Union Territory portal, with physical copies to be submitted at the South Pullu and North Pullu checkpoints. ILP, which can be acquired at the District Commissioner's office in Leh, is mandatory for tourists (not needed for Ladakh citizens). People are required to check-in enroute and must provide photocopies of the permits to be deposited at each checkpoint to the south and north of the pass.

Altitude sickness is a serious health concern for people not acclimatised to high altitudes. From 2022 minimum two days mandatory acclimatisation in Leh is required before crossing the pass Preventive medication, i.e. acetazolamide, can be used in this period to boost acclimatisation.

== Gallery ==
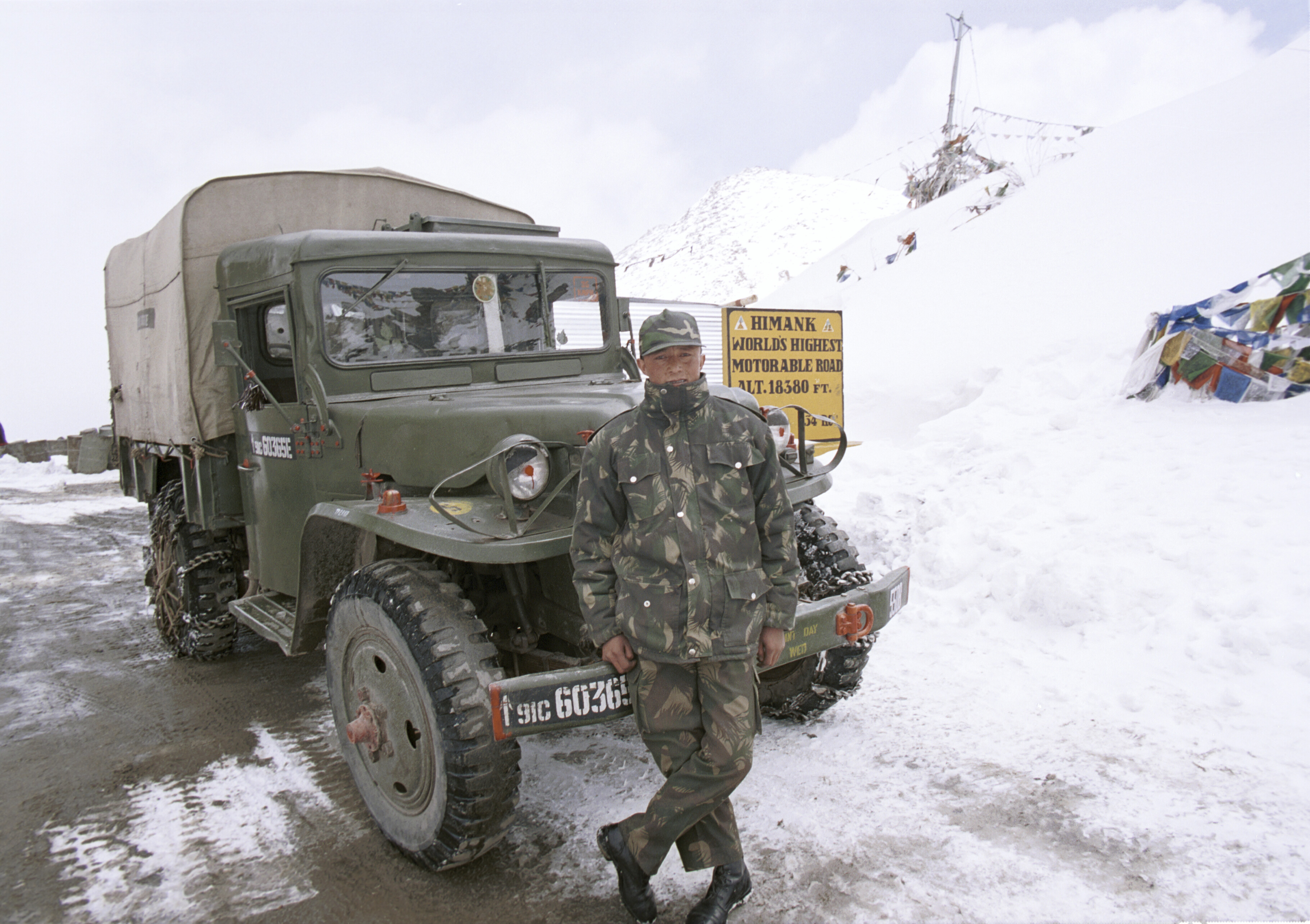
Khardung La in winter

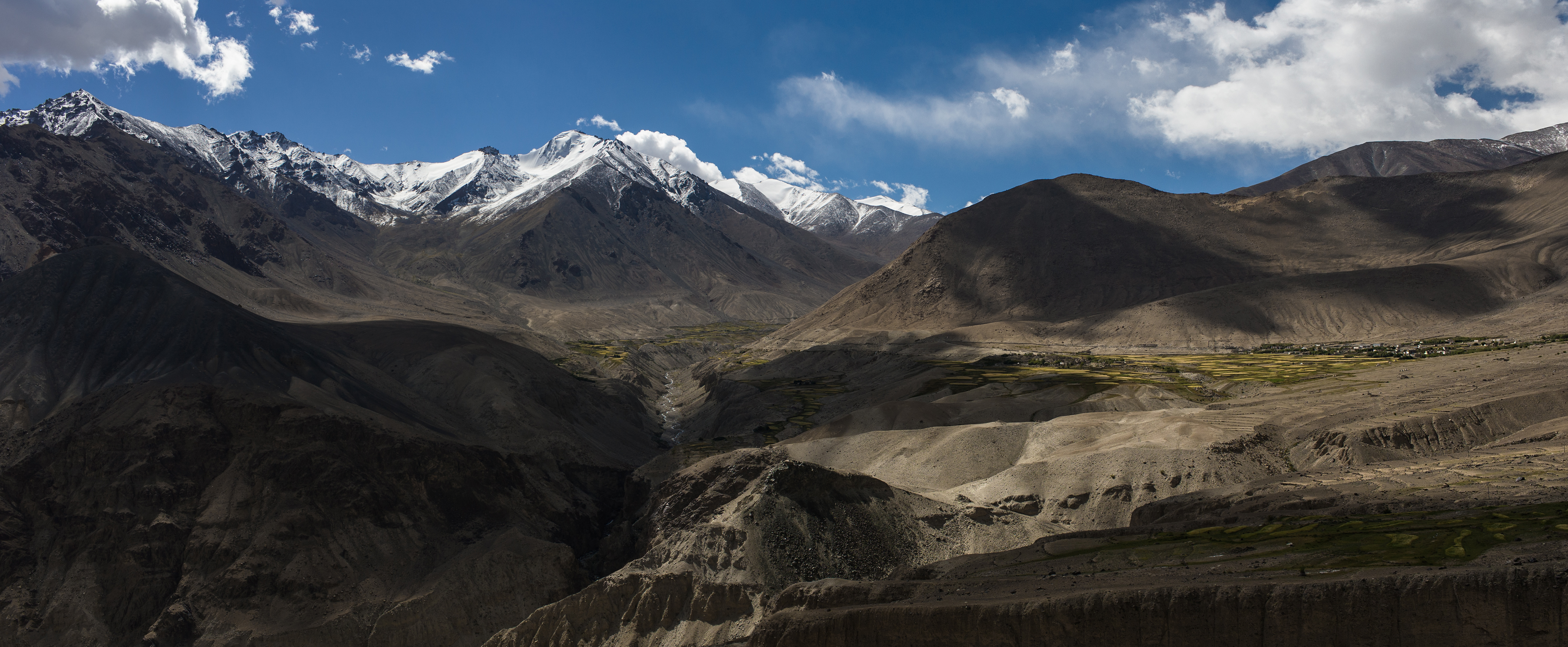
Khardung village (right), the namesake of the pass

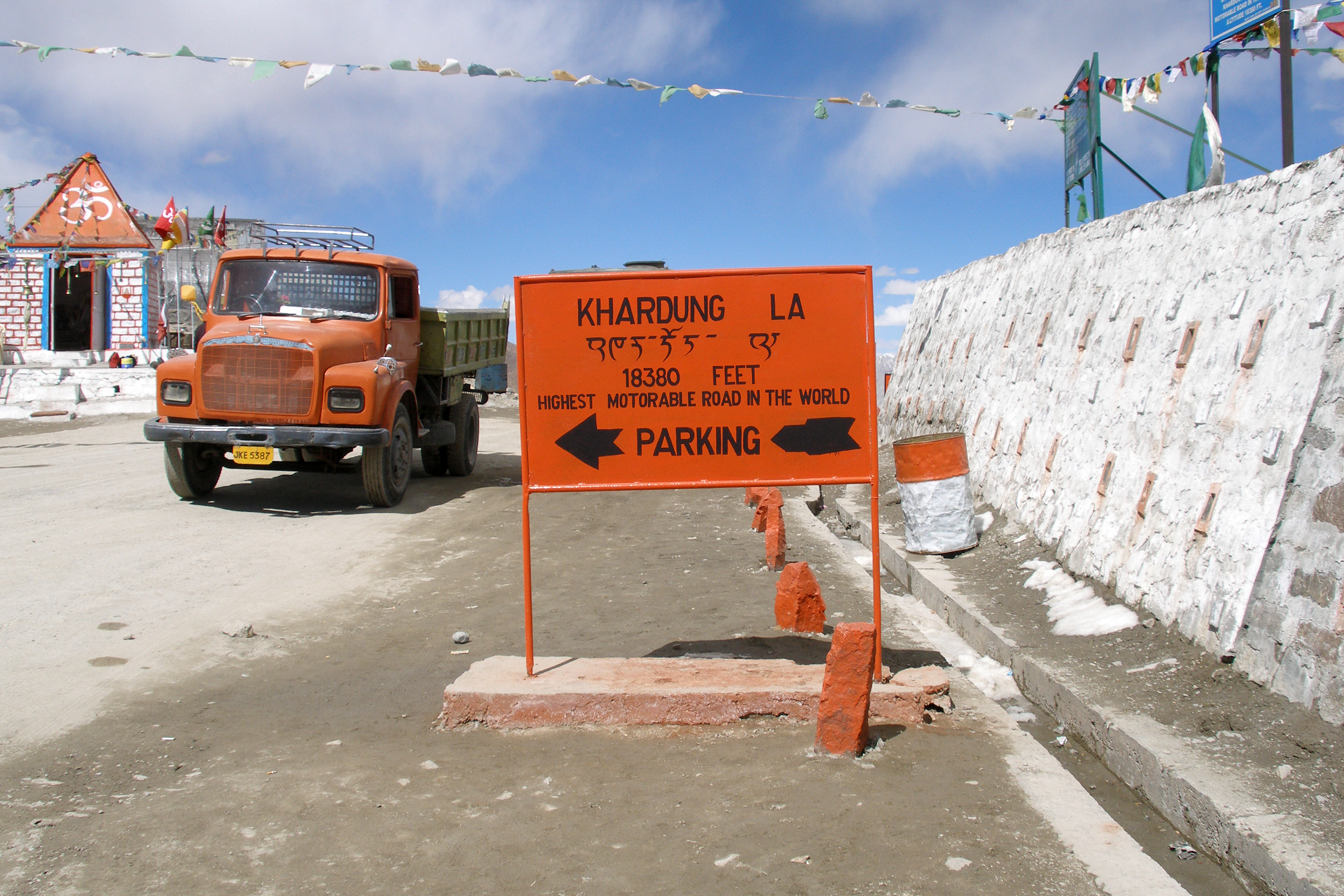
The claimed 5,602 metres (18,379 ft); the actual elevation is 5,359 metres (17,582 ft).

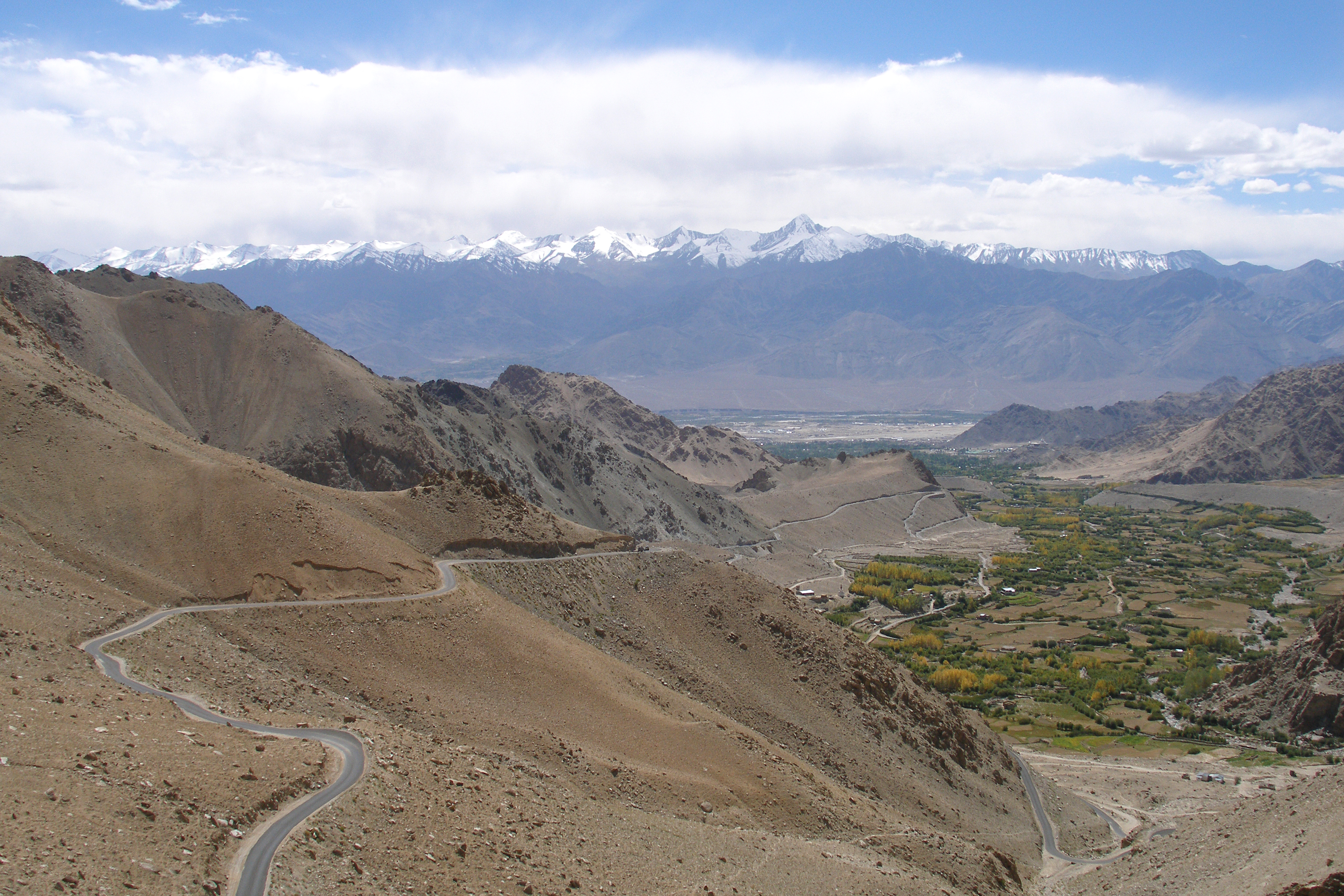
Approach from Indus Valley

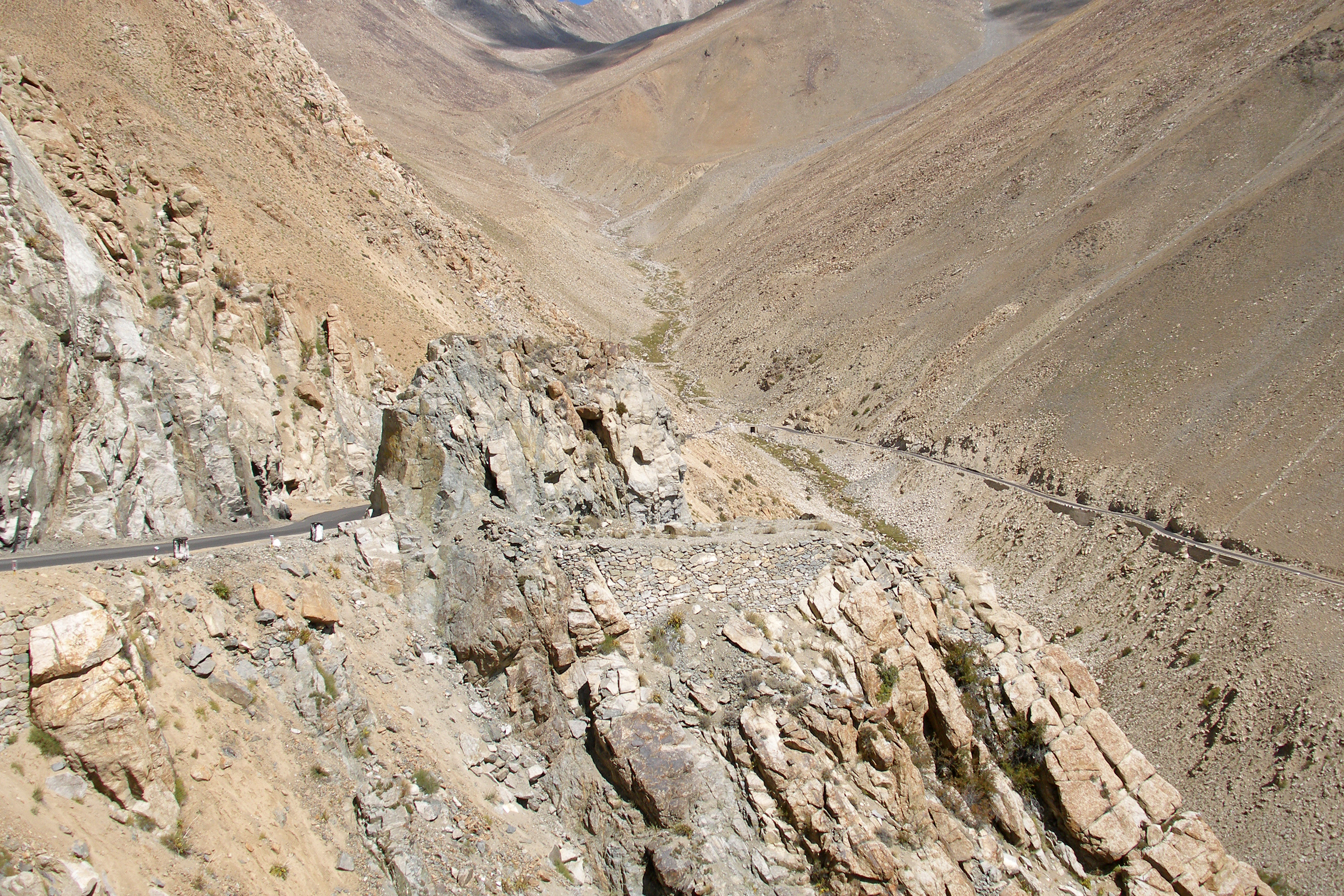
Khardung La road through the rocks

== See also ==
- Silk Road
- Extreme points of Earth
- Umling La
