= Enaam Elgretly =

Egyptian actress (born 1944)

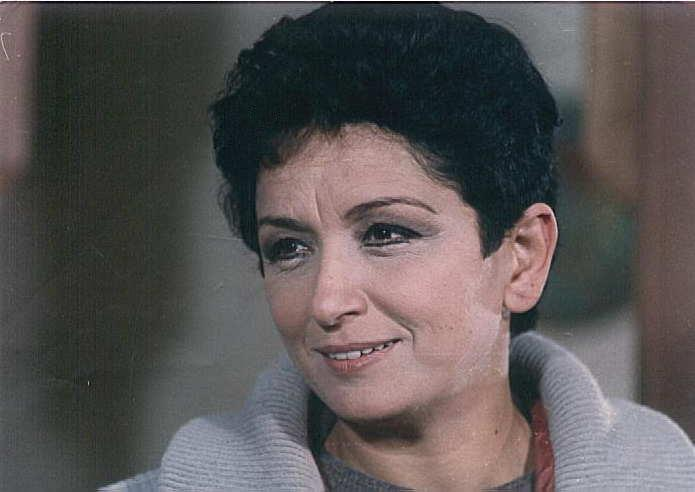
- Born: Enaam Fouad Ibrahim Elkredly; November 6, 1944 (age 81); Cairo, Egypt
- Education: Institute of Dramatic Art
- Occupation: Actress
- Years active: 1966–present
- Spouse: Mahmoud lotfy (m. 1970)

Enaam Elgretly (انعام الجريتلي), also transliterated as Inaam El Gretly, is an Egyptian actress.

== Life ==
Elgretly was born in Cairo, and is an elder sister of actress Ahlam Elgretly. In 1966 she graduated from the Institute of Dramatic Art. During a career spanning half a century, she appeared in many TV series and films, including Five-Star Thieves (1994). The most famous is the series Man and six women (راجل وست ستات), in which she appeared after the third part of the series.
