= Anam (band) =

Former Celtic band playing modern folk

- Origin: Dublin, Ireland
- Years active: 1992–2005
- Members: Brian Ó hEadhra; Fiona Mackenzie; Gordon Gunn; Nuala Kennedy
- Past members: Aimée Leonard; Anna-Wendy Stevenson; Treasa Harkin; Neil Davey; Myles Farrell; Steve Larkin; John Connolly

Anam was a former Celtic band playing modern folk in Celtic musical traditions from Ireland, England, Cornwall, Scotland and Nova Scotia. Formed by Brian Ó hEadhra in Dublin in 1992, they made their concert debut at the Festival Interceltique de Lorient in Lorient, Brittany, where they were awarded the "best band" trophy.

According to the website of founder Brian Ó hEadhra, Anam ceased operations in 2005.

== Discography ==
=== Studio albums ===
- Anam (1994)
- Saoirse (1995)
- First Footing (1997)
- Riptide (1998)
- Tine Gheal / Bright Fire (2002)

== Band members ==
=== Last members ===
- Brian Ó hEadhra — vocals, guitar, bodhrán
- Fiona Mackenzie — vocals, bodhrán
- Gordon Gunn
- Nuala Kennedy — flute, woodwind

=== Former members ===
- Aimée Leonard — vocals, bodhrán
- Anna-Wendy Stevenson — fiddle
- Treasa Harkin — button accordion
- Neil Davey — mandolin, bouzouki
- Tim Edey — button accordion
- Myles Farrell
- Steve Larkin — fiddle
- John Connolly button accordion
- Tom Doorley flute
- Stephen O'Kelly fiddle

=== Guests on recordings ===
- Conrad Ivitsky — bass
- James Mackintosh — drums
- Calum Malcolm — keyboards
