= Kim Swales =

British economist

Kim Swales is a Professor of Economics at the University of Strathclyde.

Swales is a graduate of Queens' College, Cambridge; his main research interests are in regional economics. In 1989 he joined the Fraser of Allander Institute to become a key member in an ESRC-funded project to develop a macro-micro model of the Scottish economy (AMOS).

He has published widely in the field of regional economics, regional modelling and regional policy and until recently was associate editor of Regional Studies and is on the management committee of the ESRC Urban and Regional Study Group.

In particular, he has worked with various novel approaches to helping unemployment such as tax breaks on value-added tax.

Swales is a coauthor of an alternative approach to the minimum wage submitted to the European Commission. This provides incentives for a minimum wage without mandating it, by using tax breaks per employee to reduce the value added tax paid by employers. The report of the team's modelling states that this would not only increase employment levels but also increase GDP, i.e. it would reverse any unemployment and deadweight loss effects of a mandated minimum wage, acting as a Pigovian subsidy.
