= Hundar =

Hundar may refer to:

== Places ==
- Hundar, India, a village in the Leh district of Ladakh, India famous for sand dunes and Bactrian camels
- Hundar Dok, a village in the Leh district of Jammu and Kashmir, India
- Hondor, Lorestan, a village in Lorestan Province, Iran

== People ==
- Robert Hundar (1935–2008), Italian film actor and stage actor

== See also ==
- Hundur Monastery, also known as Hundur Gompa, Buddhist monastery in the Hundar village, in the Nubra Valley of Ladakh, northern India
