= Tegar =

Tegar Kyagar
- Village
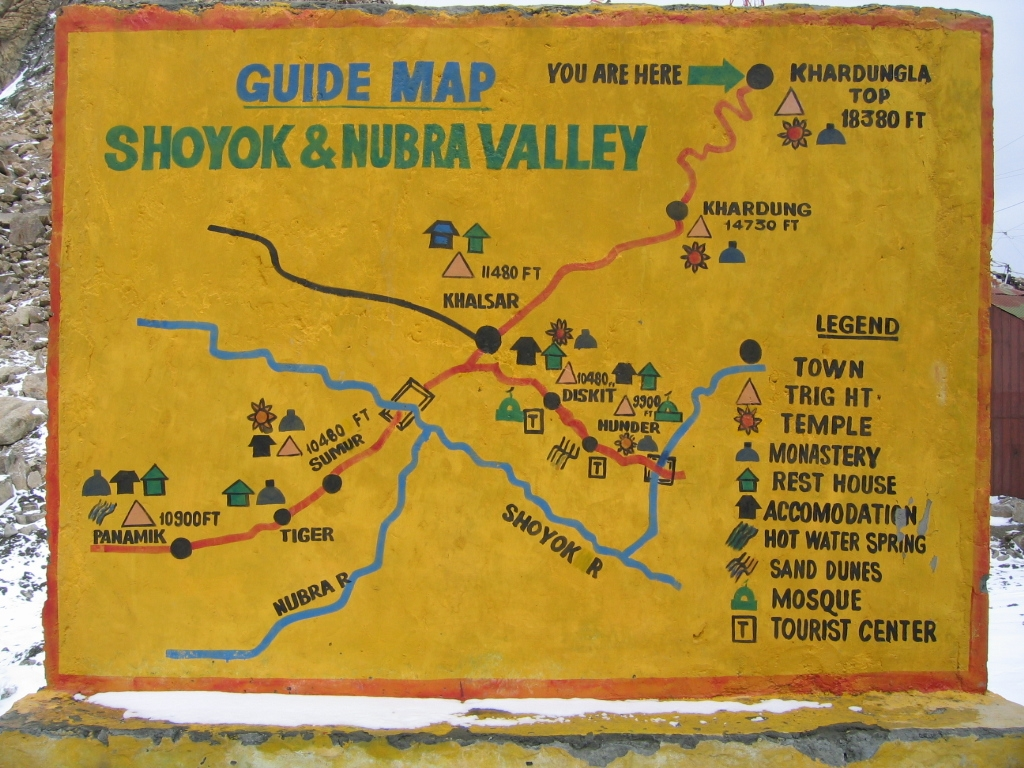
- Map showing the location of Tegar in the Nubra Valley

- Location in Ladakh, India Tegar (India)
- Coordinates: 34.637900°N 78.015617°E
- Country: India
- Union Territory: Ladakh
- District: Nubra
- Tehsil: Sumoor

Population (2011)
  - Total: 859
- Time zone: UTC+5:30 (IST)
- Census code: 931

Tegar, also known as Kyagar, Tigger, is a high-altitude village in the Nubra district of Ladakh, India. It is located in the Sumoor tehsil, in the Nubra Valley.

== Buddhism in Tegar ==
Tegar is a Buddhist village on the fringes of the Tibetan Cultural Area.

There are two sects of Buddhists living in the village. Each sect has a specific affiliation to the nearby monasteries of the sect. One set of villagers belong to the Gelukpa Order or Yellow Hat Sect of Buddhists, and they are under the religious patronage of the Samtsaling Monastery, which is 3 km away from the village. The second set of people, from a hamlet of the village, belong to the Diskit Gompa, the oldest and the largest monastery. Both monasteries own land in the village, which are given on tenement to the villagers for raising agricultural crops. Every month, the Lapsang ritual is observed by the villagers, which is presided by the monks deputed by the particular Order of the monastery. The villagers also attend the monastery of their affiliation on all festival events. In addition to the monasteries, there are two Manekhangs or temples, one of each sect, in the village. A monk is appointed as a priest for each of these temples and they are drawn from the monasteries of the same Order.

== Demographics ==
According to the 2011 census of India, Tegar has 204 households. The effective literacy rate (i.e. the literacy rate of population excluding children aged 6 and below) is 55.08%.

Demographics (2011 Census)
	Total	Male	Female
Population	859	397	462
Children aged below 6 years	91	50	41
Scheduled caste	0	0	0
Scheduled tribe	857	396	461
Literates	423	223	200
Workers (all)	444	237	207
Main workers (total)	172	116	56
Main workers: Cultivators	77	65	12
Main workers: Agricultural labourers	2	0	2
Main workers: Household industry workers	0	0	0
Main workers: Other	93	51	42
Marginal workers (total)	272	121	151
Marginal workers: Cultivators	186	44	142
Marginal workers: Agricultural labourers	3	0	3
Marginal workers: Household industry workers	1	0	1
Marginal workers: Others	82	77	5
Non-workers	415	160	255

== Geography ==
The hills on which the village is situated forms the southern slopes of the Karakoram Range. The geological formation of the hill has been recorded as granite formations, and named after the hill peak of Tegar, as Tegar Granites. The granites consists of two types of micas – muscovite and biotite. This formation is unlike the granite and volcanic formation of the Ladakh granite and Shylock Volcanic. Its formation has been attributed to the thermal metamorphosis process due to which the rocks attained the andalusitic horn-felsic form.

Tegar is one of the villages in the Nubra Valley (average elevation of about 10,000 ft), known as the village of alfalfa and fertile soil, on the silk route, and caravans used to halt here while travelling from between Central Asia and Kashmir and the locals used to lease out grazing land to the traders so that their livestock can graze; the other important villages on this route are Khardong, Khalsar, Tirit, Sumoor, Pinchemik, Chamshein, Tirisha and Panamic (see map). The principal hotels in the village are Kyagar - On the Silk Route, Lchang Nang Retreat, Hotel Yarab Tso and the Hotel Rimo which are about 500 m away from the village. It is under the Diskit administrative Sub-Division and the main approach road to the valley passes through the highest Khardung La mountain pass (18,380 ft), which is accessible throughout the year.
