= Diskit Monastery =

Buddhist monastery in Ladakh, India

Diskit Monastery Galdan Tashi Chuling Gompa
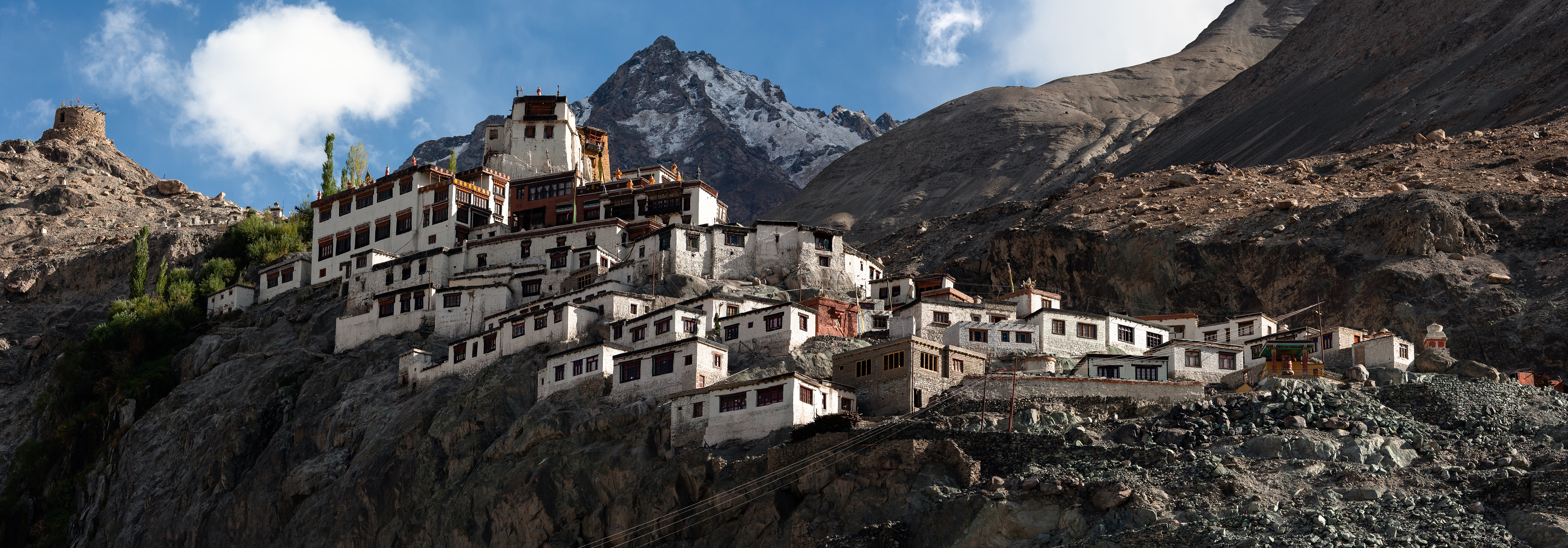
- Diskit Monastery

- Location within India

Religion
- Affiliation: Tibetan Buddhism
- Sect: Gelugpa
- Deity: Tsong Khapa
- Festival: Desmochhey

Location
- Location: Diskit, Nubra, Leh, Ladakh, India
- Coordinates: 34°32′28″N 77°33′37″E

Architecture
- Style: Gompa
- Founder: Changzem Tserab Zangpo
- Established: 14th century
- Located in Diskit village, the headquarters of Nubra Valley

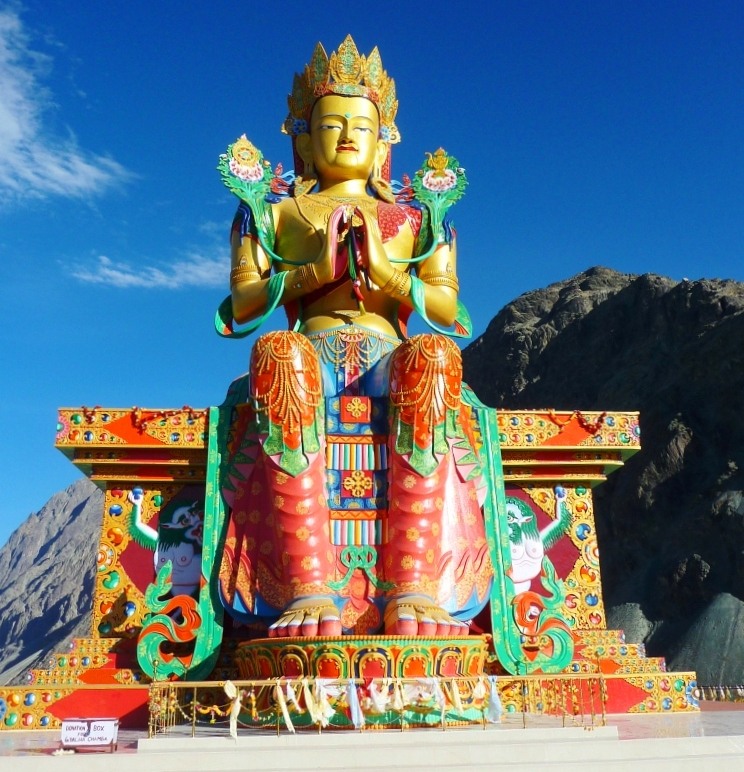
33 metre statue of Maitreya Buddha near Diskit monastery facing down the Shyok River towards the Nubra Valley

Diskit Monastery also known as Deskit Gompa or Diskit Gompa is the oldest and largest Buddhist monastery (gompa) in Diskit, Nubra Valley of the Leh district of Ladakh. It is 115 km north of Leh.

It belongs to the Gelugpa (Yellow Hat) sect of Tibetan Buddhism and was founded by Changzem Tserab Zangpo, a disciple of Tsong Khapa, founder of Gelugpa, in the 14th century. It is a sub-gompa of the Thikse gompa.

Lachung Temple and Hundur Monastery are also located nearby, the latter below the main road near a bridge.

The monastery has a statue of Cho Rinpoche (Crowned Buddha) in the prayer hall, a huge drum and several images of fierce guardian deities. An elevated cupola of the monastery depicts a fresco of the Tashilhunpo Monastery of Tibet.

The monastery administration runs a school, with support from a non-government organization known as the "Tibet Support Group". The school has computer facilities and teaches science subjects, in English, to Tibetan children of the region.

A popular festival known as Dosmoche or the "Festival of the Scapegoat" is held in the precincts of the monastery in February, largely attended by people from villages of the Nubra Valley since the other regions in Leh are inaccessible during this period due to heavy snowfall.

== History ==
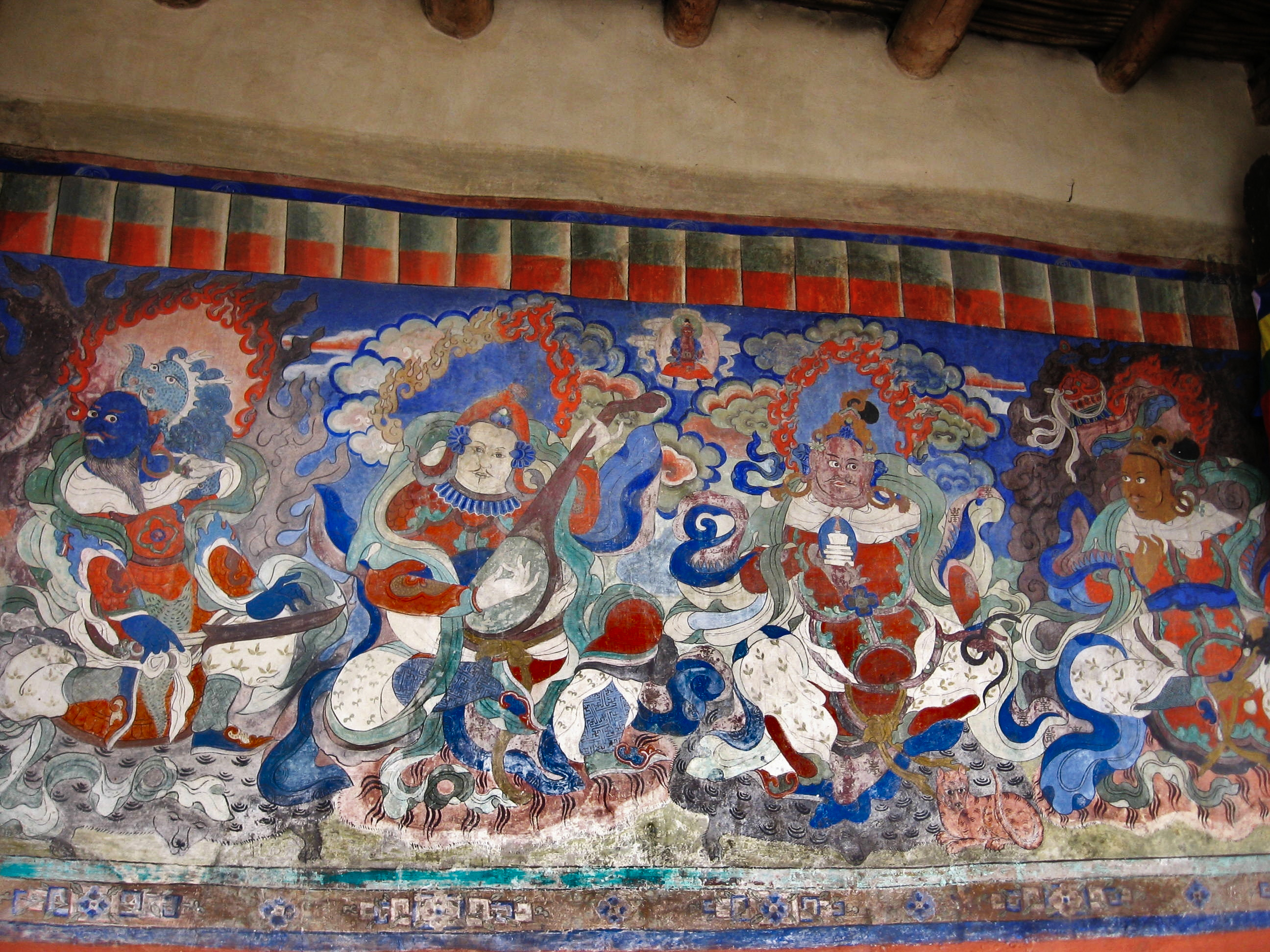
A renovated mural depicting the Four Heavenly Kings opposite a prayer hall (2009). The same mural is seen in a ruined stage in the 2004 photo (below, in Structures) at the top of the stairs.

The Diskit monastery was founded by Changzem Tserab Zangpo in the 14th century. Ladakh was then ruled by King Grags-pa-'bum-lde (1400–1440) and his brother, who unsuccessfully attempted to usurp Nubra Valley, which was under a local ruler named Nyig-ma-grags-pa. The local ruler assisted a Gelugpa order advocate to build the monastery at Diskit and deify the idol of Tsong Khapa, the founder of the Gelugpa sect, in the monastery. During the rule of King Blogros-chog-idan (1440–1470) who had even controlled western Tibet, Panchen Lha-btsun - a resident of Nubra Valley by birth - studied in Tibet and later became a regent to the founder of Tashilhunpo Monastery and finally during his last stage of life returned to Nubra. His remains have been preserved in Charasa. In 1500, Ladakh was ruled by Bkra-shis-rnam-rgyal, who fought the invader Mirza Haider of Central Asia, in Nubra and close to Leh, finally defeated the latter and thus brought Nubra under the Ladakh king's rule. Even then, the local chieftains still yielded power in Diskit and India. Shia Muslims started settling in Nubra after this war. Bkra-shis-rnam-rgyal' son, Tshedbang-rnam-rgyal, ruled Ladakh from 1530 and expanded his kingdom. At that time, Nubra people prevailed on him and prevented him from invading Hor in Xinjiang, as trade with Yarkand was considered crucial to Nubra. During the reign of Jams-dbang-rnam-rgyal, historical records indicate that a regular tribute payment was made by the Nubra people to the king. King Bde-'Idanrnam-rgyal (1620–45) successfully defeated Baltistan and the Mughals. Rgyal kings were very religious and built mani walls throughout their kingdom. Monks were specially engaged to recite hymns of Mani-tung chur in Nubra Valley and in other surrounding areas. In the mid-eighteenth century, Tshe-dbang-rnam-rgyal gave control of Diskit monastery to the Rinpoche of Thikse Monastery and this arrangement has been perpetuated to this day. Since then, Diskit is considered a sub-gompa of Thikse.

== Geography ==
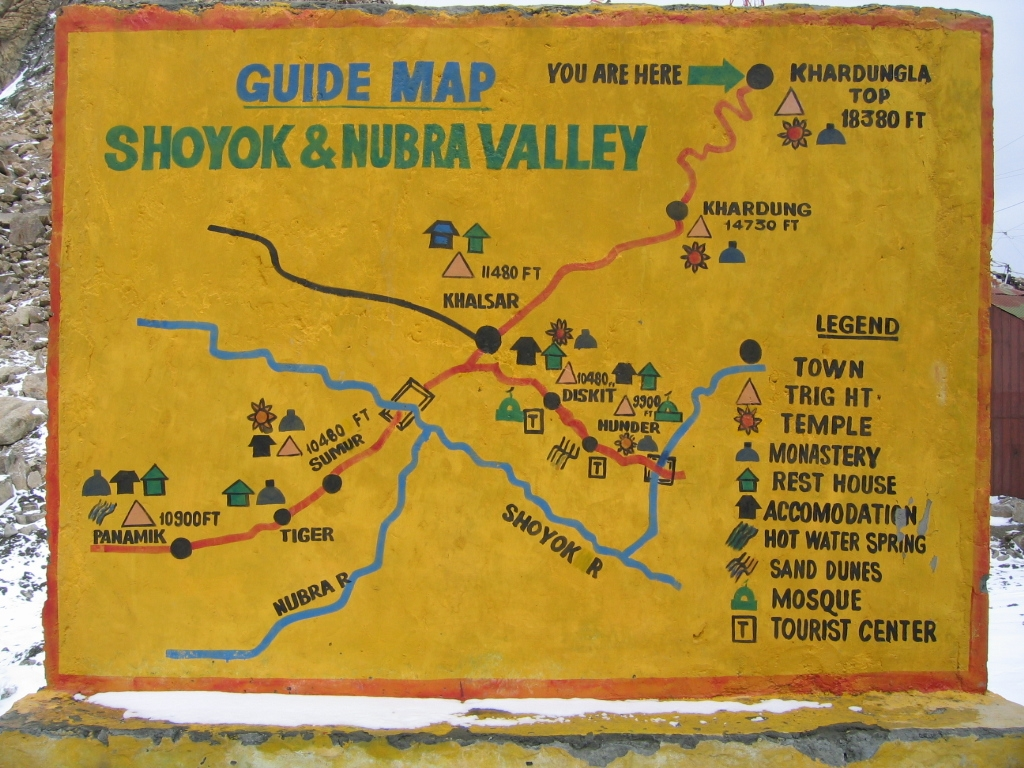
Location of Diskit and Khardong La pass in the Nubra Valley

The Diskit monastery is situated on a hill above the flood plains of the Shyok River, on its right bank in the Diskit village (3,144 metres (10,315 ft)) in Nubra Valley. Nubra River is a tributary of the Shyok River, which flows parallel to the Indus River on the northern side of the Ladakh Range. Since the valley is at a lower elevation, it has a mild climate, which has created lush vegetation, so the valley is therefore called the "orchard of Ladakh". The valley was part of the caravan route between Tibet and China. The valley is also the home of the double-humped Bactrian camel. It is located past Leh, beyond the Khardung La pass. Since the mountains often become impassable in winter, Diskit village and the monastery in the valley are primarily the congregation centre for people of the valley. Diskit is the headquarters of the Nubra Valley and thus has government offices with basic facilities. It is also connected by road with Leh.

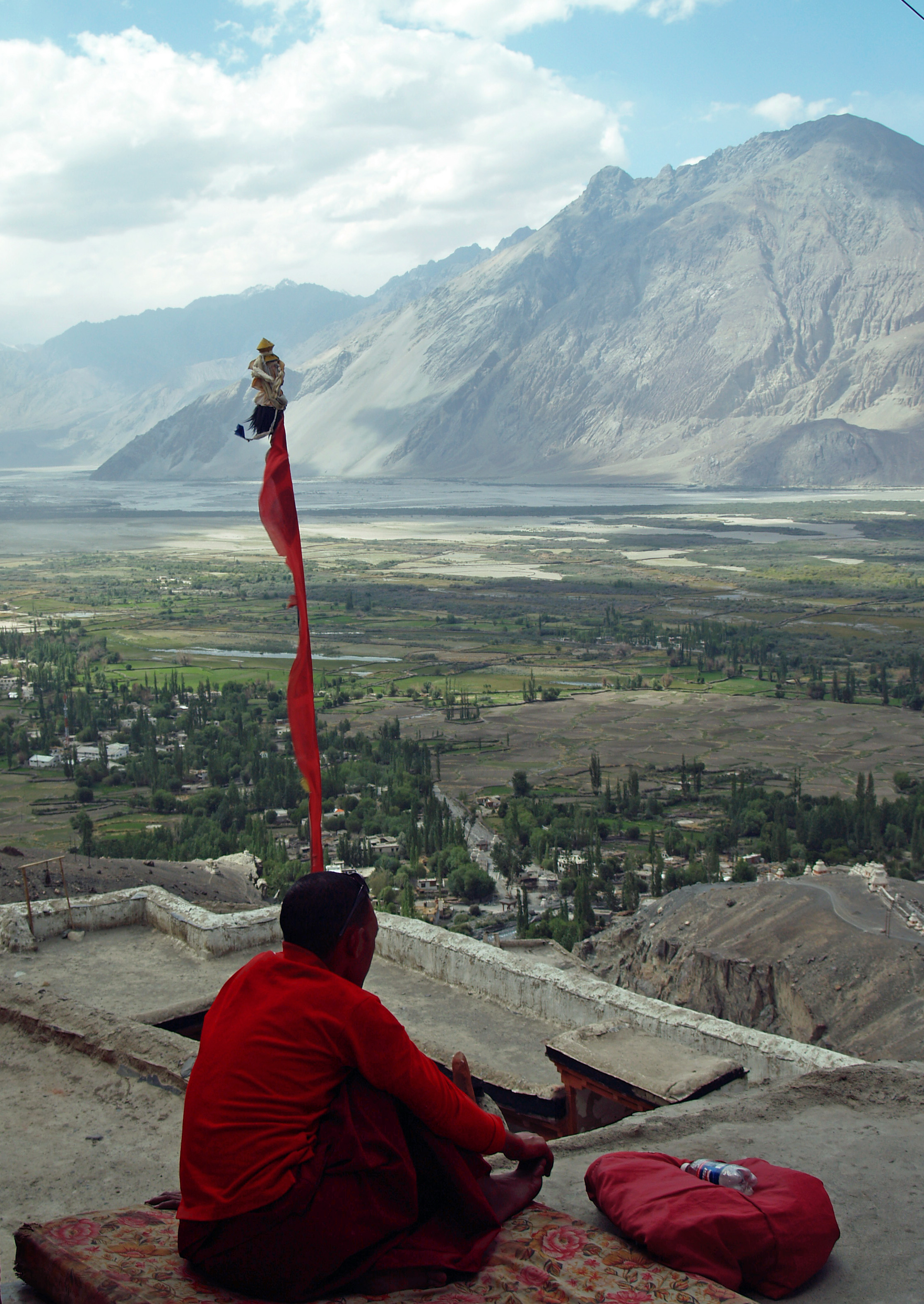
A monk meditates on a terrace at Diskit monastery, with Nubra Valley and Diskit village in the background

Access road to the monastery is from Diskit village along a rugged and dusty road that crosses a stream in the middle of the village.

The village reached from Leh by the Khardung pass. Traffic may be disrupted between October and May due to snowfall and landslides. This road is often incorrectly called to be the highest motorable road in the world. The road from Leh passes through South Pullu (an army camp), then Khardung La (5,359 metres (17,582 ft)), and down to North Pullu. Foreign visitors have to register their entry to Nubru Valley here. The road moves down to Khardung village, slopes down to the Khalsar village on the valley floor, then bifurcates. The left branch from Khalsar village leads to Diskit and Hunder villages, while the right branch leads to Sumur and Panamik villages. Leh to Diskit is 150 kilometres (93 mi) by a road that is maintained by the Indian Army.

== Structures ==
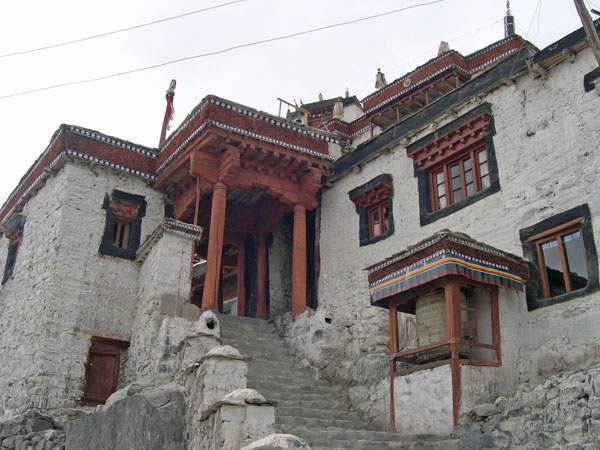
Approach to the Monastery

Diskit Monastery was built at the edge of the access road. This road links to Parthapur and Those. A flight of stone steps leads to the prayer hall of the monastery. A statue of Maitreya Buddha is enshrined in the hall, and a huge drum. In the chamber on the second floor are many images of fierce guardian deities.

Diskit Monastery also has an elevated cupola, with a fresco depicting the Tashilhunpo Monastery of Tibet, a number of shrines, and Mongolian and Tibetan texts in the storehouse. Diskit Monastery is connected to Mongol mythology: an evil anti-Buddhist Mongol demon is said to have once lived and been killed near the monastery grounds, but have been resurrected several times. Today, the wrinkled head and hand of the demon are believed to lie inside a temple in the monastery.

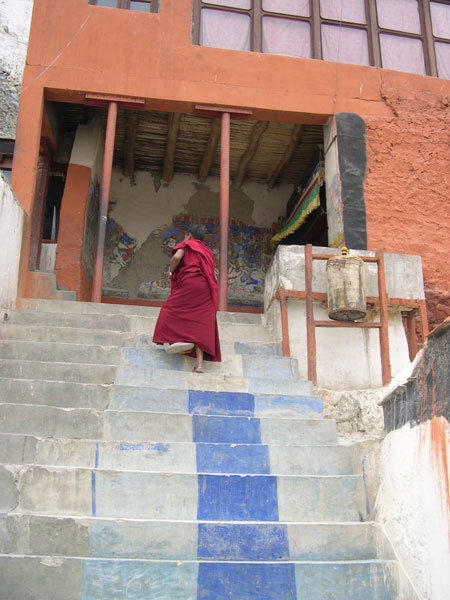
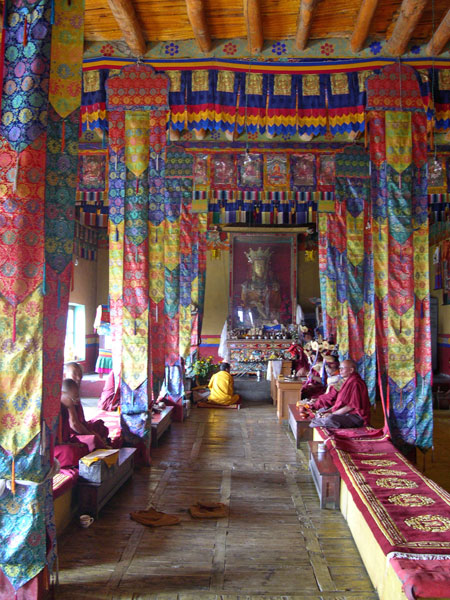
Left: Steps up to recent extensions to the monastery. (2004) Right: Maitreya Buddha in the hall

Recent extensions to the monastery building are in good shape but the dukhang ("main prayer hall") and zimcchungh are not in good condition. Paintings are covered with soot and images are kept in total disorder. The older part of the monastery is said to be in certain degree of decay, as cracks have been observed, and remain untended.

== Large statue of Jampa (Maitreya) Buddha ==
The photong or official residence of the chief lama of Nubra is located at the foot of the hill, where there is also a very large statue of Jampa (Maitreya) Buddha.

This impressive 32 metre (106 foot) statue on top of a hill below the monastery, faces down the Shyok River towards Pakistan and, according to Tsering Norphel, chairman of the committee that commissioned it, most of its funding came from local donations. The head of the Gelugpa, Ganden Thipa (the reincarnation of Tsongkhapa), and abbott of the Rizu monastery, gave 8 kg of gold for its decoration. It is the first time a Ladakhi monk has been the head of the Gelugpa sect.

The statue's construction was begun in April 2006 and it was consecrated by the Dalai Lama on 25 July 2010. Nophel says the statue was built with three main functions in mind - protection of Diskit village, prevention of further war with Pakistan, and world peace.

== Lachung temple ==
Lachung temple is close to but above the Diskit monastery, and is said to be one of the oldest temples in the Nubra Valley. A large idol of Tsong Khapa is deified there and a Gelugpa yellow hat crowns the image.

== School ==
The monastery, which houses about 100 monks, runs a school in its precincts. This school teaches Tibetan children. The school has been upgraded recently to enable teaching of scientific subjects with support from the Lungta, a 'Tibet Support Group' (a non governmental organization) that has created computer facilities in the school. Lungta has trained the monks of the monastery in computer skills and in the English language so that they could in turn teach the children of the school. Further additions to the school library in the form of dictionaries, encyclopaedias and English teaching materials are being provided.

== Festival ==
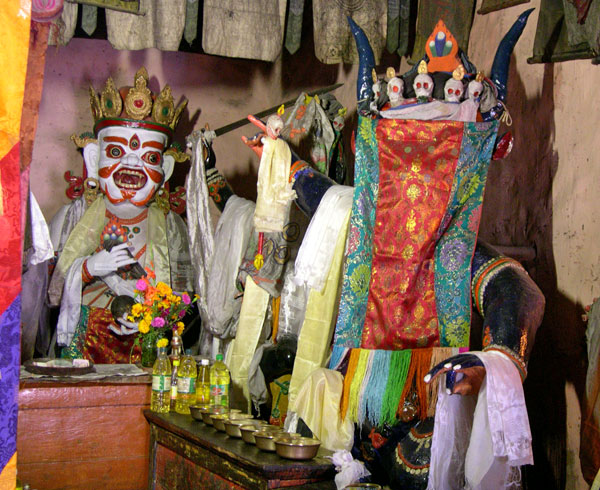
Statues of guardian deities, whose heads are uncovered only during the festival.

Desmochhey or Dosmoche, also known as "Festival of the Scapegoat", is the popular prayer festival that is celebrated at Diskit Monastery, Likir Monastery and Leh Palace in Leh. Since the festival is celebrated in February, when snowbound Khardong peak is not passable to attend similar festivities at Likir monastery in Leh, large crowds from villages in the Nubra Valley assemble at Diskit to witness the mask dance. The mask dance, also known as Cham dance, is performed by the lamas of the monastery to dramatically express the superiority of good over evil forces. The dances are believed to avoid ill-fortune in the new year (Tibetan new year is celebrated in December/January). On this occasion, images made of dough are thrown out to deter any disaster occurring and to usher peace and prosperity to the people. The cloths covering the heads of deity statues are removed in this period.

== Gallery ==
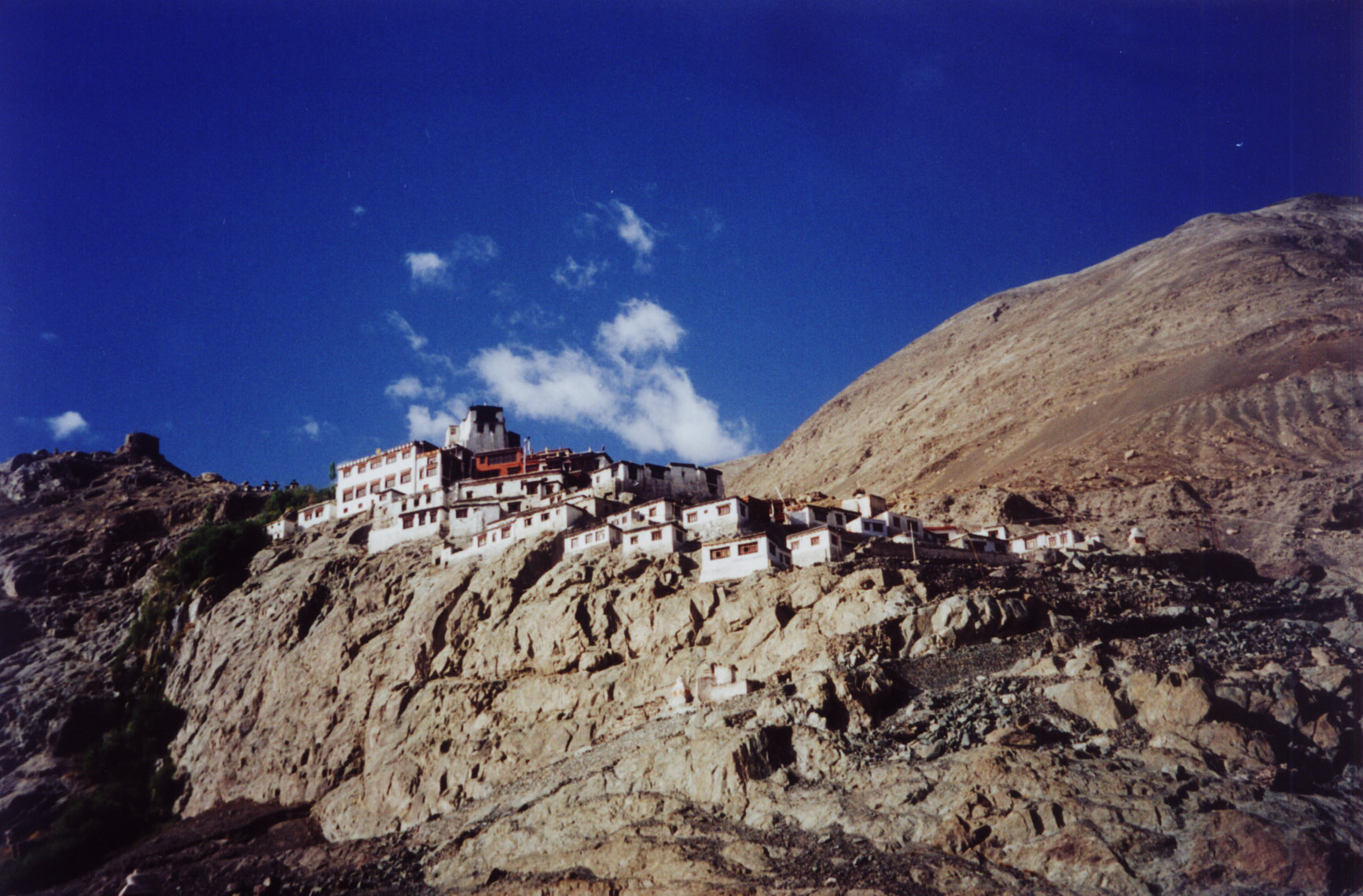
Diskit Monastery

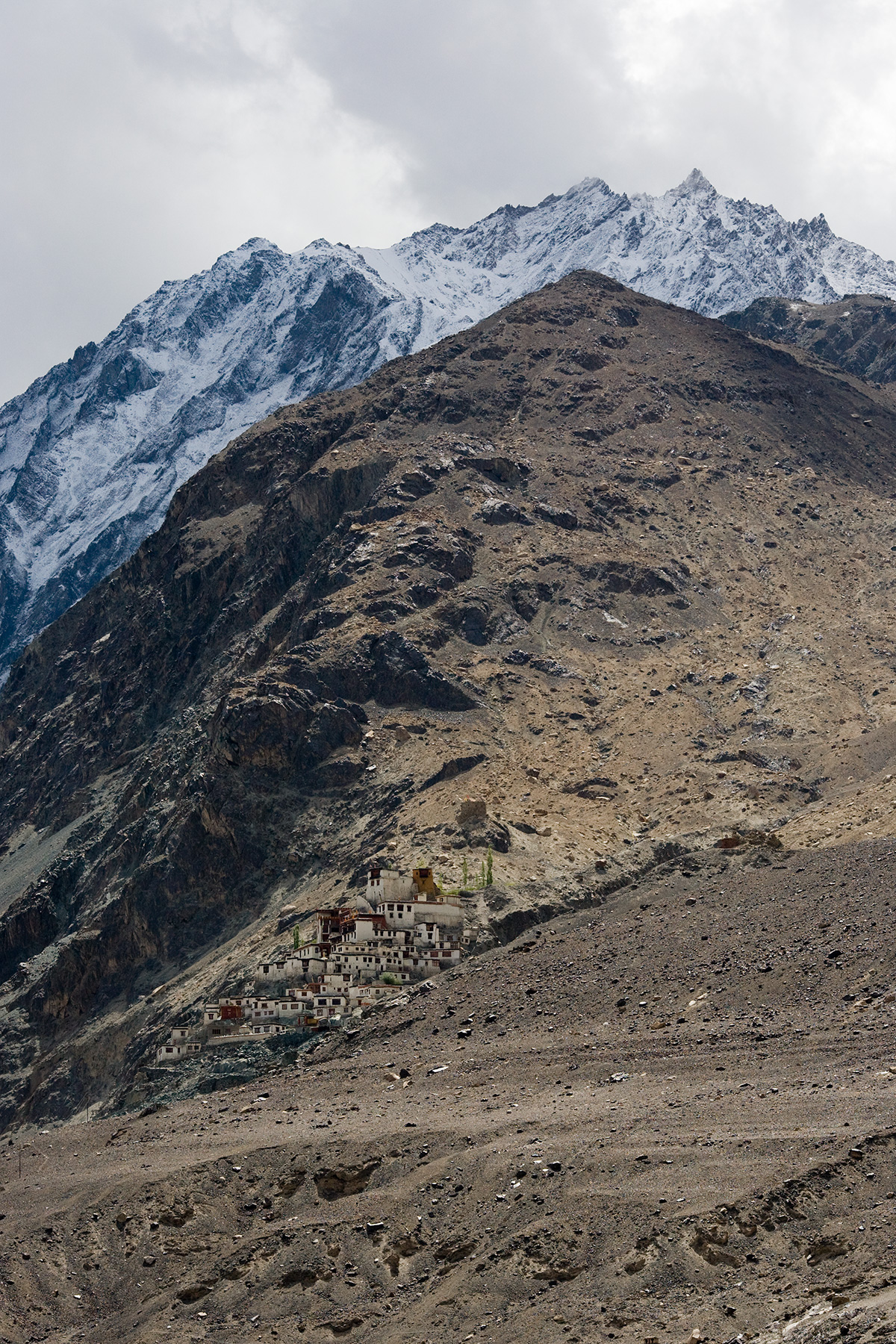
Diskit monastery perched against the hills

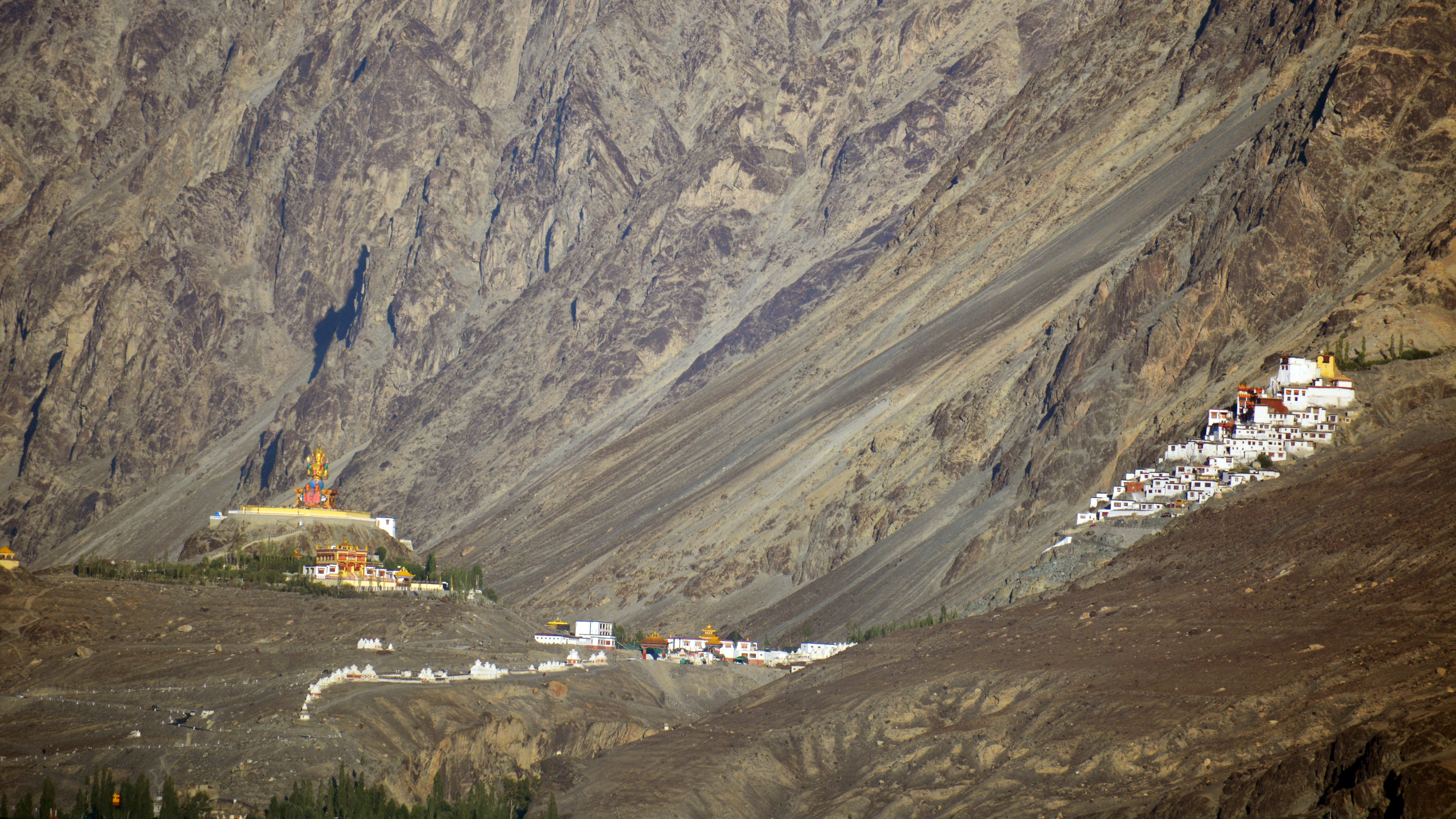
Diskit Monastery broad view

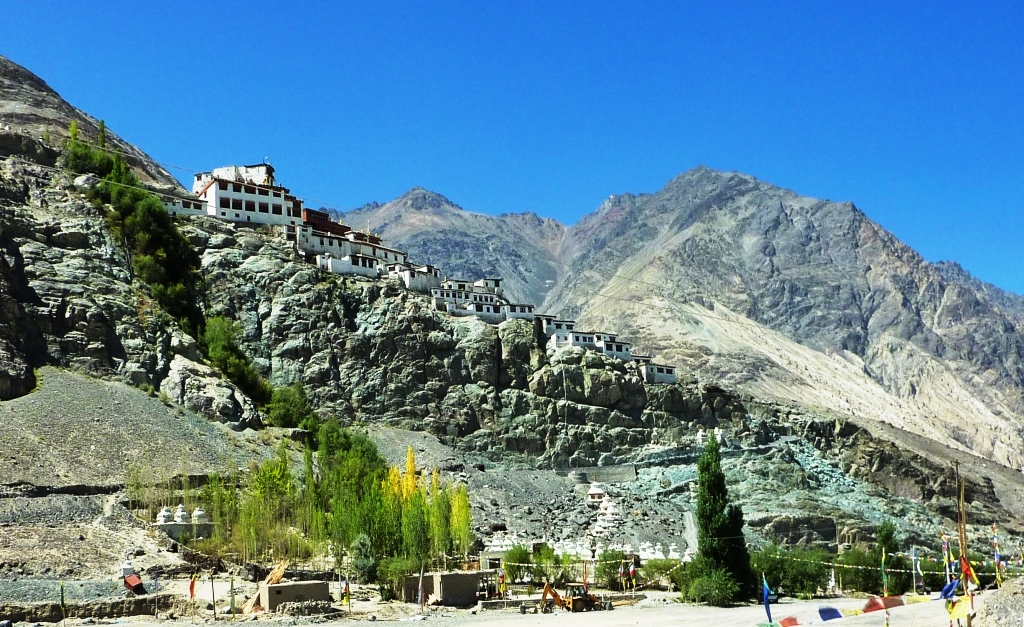
Diskit Gompa. Nubra. 2010

== See also ==
- List of buddhist monasteries in Ladakh
- Geography of Ladakh
- Tourism in Ladakh

== Sources ==
- Rizvi, Janet. 1996. Ladakh: Crossroads of High Asia. Second Edition. Oxford India Paperbacks. 3rd Impression 2001. ISBN 0-19-564546-4.
- Traverse Nubra valley with the lens of 22 years old
