= Hundri =

- Village
- Location in Ladakh, India Hundri (India)
- Coordinates: 34.671705°N 77.388500°E
- Country: India
- Union Territory: Ladakh
- District: Nubra
- Tehsil: Diskit
- PIN: 194401
- Elevation: 3,200 m (10,500 ft)

Population (2011)
  - Total: 238
- Time zone: UTC+5:30 (IST)
- Census code: 920

Hundri is a village in the Nubra district of Ladakh, India. It is located in the Diskit tehsil, beside the Shyok River. There is no bridge in village Hundri. Terchey and Udmaru are neighbours of Hundri. Fruits such as apricot, mulberry, apple, strawberry are grown there.

In Hundri, there is a need for a bridge between Udmaru and Hundri which will connect Udmaru, Hundri and Shukur village. It will also benefit the pilgrimage to Sham Gonbo and it will become the centre of attraction for tourists. There is a need for protection bandh at Shyok River as it poses a threat to the field, trees, and people's property. The people also face a drinking water problem as they depend on the Shyok River for it.

== Demographics ==
According to the 2011 census of India, Hundri has 53 households. The effective literacy rate (i.e. the literacy rate of population excluding children aged 6 and below) is 47.75%.

Demographics (2011 Census)
	Total	Male	Female
Population	238	108	130
Children aged below 6 years	16	6	10
Scheduled caste	0	0	0
Scheduled tribe	238	108	130
Literates	106	59	47
Workers (all)	144	70	74
Main workers (total)	14	12	2
Main workers: Cultivators	0	0	0
Main workers: Agricultural labourers	0	0	0
Main workers: Household industry workers	0	0	0
Main workers: Other	14	12	2
Marginal workers (total)	130	58	72
Marginal workers: Cultivators	129	58	71
Marginal workers: Agricultural labourers	0	0	0
Marginal workers: Household industry workers	0	0	0
Marginal workers: Others	1	0	1
Non-workers	94	38	56
