= Ladakh Marathon =

Marathon held in northern India

- The Ladakh Marathon logo
- Date: 9 - 12 September 2027, 14th edition
- Location: Leh, Ladakh, India
- Event type: Road race
- Distance: Siachen Ultra (111 Miles); Silk Route Ultra (122 km); Khardung La Challenge (72 km); Marathon; Half Marathon; 11.2 km Run; 5 km Run For Fun
- Primary sponsor: None
- Established: 2012
- Course records: Silk Route Ultra (122K) Men: 12:12:18 (India) Nawang Tsering; Women: 14:26:29 (India) Tenzing Dolma Khardung La Challenge (72K); Men: 5:41:36 (India) Jigmet Namgail; Women: 7:03:26 (India) Deskit Dolma Marathon (42K); Men: 2:41:42 (India) Nawang Tsering; Women: 3:13:00 (India) Stanzin Chondol Half Marathon (21K); Men: 1:13:10 (India) Tsetan Namgail; Women: 1:29:43 (India) Stanzin Chondol 11.2K; Men: 0:42:22 (India) Sonam Stanzin Women: 0:47:30 (India) Skarma Edong Lanzas
- Website: Official website

The Ladakh Marathon is an annual international running event held in Leh, in the Indian Union Territory of Ladakh, typically during the second week of September. With race routes reaching altitudes of up to 17,618 feet (5,370 meters), it is recognized as the world’s highest AIMS-certified marathon. The event joined the Association of International Marathons and Distance Races (AIMS) in 2015. Its 2026 edition featured a total prize pool of ₹1 crore.

The event comprises six race categories: the Silk Route Ultra (122 km), the Khardung La Challenge (72 km), the Full Marathon (42.195 km), the Half Marathon (21.0975 km), the 11.2 km Run and the 5 km Run for Fun.

The marathon’s high-altitude setting presents substantial physiological and logistical challenges. Routes span elevations of approximately 10,300 to 17,618 feet (3,140 to 5,370 meters), where reduced oxygen availability, steep terrain and significant temperature fluctuations add to the demands of endurance running. The ultra-marathon categories involve prolonged efforts across remote mountain terrain, including sections undertaken at night. These combined conditions make the Ladakh Marathon a demanding high-altitude endurance event, attracting runners from India and abroad.

The Ladakh Marathon has announced a seventh new race, the Siachen Ultra, a 111-mile (180 km) ultramarathon which will debut in September 2027 with a select field of ultra runners. Conceived as the world’s toughest high-altitude ultra-running challenge, the race will traverse the Trans-Himalayan ranges, combining extreme distance, altitude, terrain and temperature variations in a single course.

== History ==
The Ladakh Marathon was established in 2012, following the devastating flash floods that struck Ladakh in August 2010, causing loss of life and widespread damage to settlements and livelihoods. The event was conceived to demonstrate Ladakh’s resilience, encourage running and healthy living among local youth, and provide a platform for competitive distance running.

The inaugural edition attracted approximately 1,500 participants across four race categories. Over the following editions, the event expanded in scale and participation, drawing runners from across India and internationally. By its 11th edition, participation had grown to nearly 6,000 runners across six race categories. In 2015, the Ladakh Marathon joined the Association of International Marathons and Distance Races (AIMS).

Held in the high-altitude landscape surrounding Leh, the marathon presents challenges beyond distance alone. Routes extend from approximately 10,300 feet to 17,618 feet (3,140–5,370 meters), where reduced oxygen availability, steep mountain terrain and substantial temperature variations increase the physiological demands of endurance running.

Khardung La Challenge

Introduced in 2012, the Khardung La Challenge is a 72 km ultramarathon that takes runners through the high-altitude terrain of the Khardung La pass, at an elevation of approximately 17,618 feet (5,370 meters). The race was first held with just 11 participants, predominantly local runners, including members of a local ice hockey team.

According to the event’s founding account, the inaugural field was assembled despite a lack of initial registrations, with local ice hockey players and other young Ladakhis taking on the distance. Their familiarity with the region’s cold climate and high-altitude environment offered some preparation for the conditions, although completing 72 km across mountainous terrain posed a distinct endurance challenge.

Participation subsequently increased, reaching close to 300 runners in 2024. The race has since attracted ultra-distance runners from India and abroad, with its combination of distance, elevation and reduced oxygen availability distinguishing it from conventional road ultramarathons.

Silk Route Ultra

The Silk Route Ultra, a 122 km ultramarathon introduced in 2022, follows a route connected to historic travel corridors between Leh and the Nubra Valley. Before modern road infrastructure made motorized travel possible, journeys along these mountain routes could require several days on foot.

The course has a personal connection to Ladakh Marathon founder and race director Chewang Motup Goba, who travelled on foot between the Nubra Valley and Leh as a schoolboy. Journeys that once served as a necessity for local residents now provide the historical context for an ultramarathon in which runners must cover 122 km across high-altitude terrain within a prescribed cut-off time.

The distance, mountain passes, reduced oxygen availability and exposure to changing conditions, including cold temperatures after dark, make the Silk Route Ultra a prolonged test of endurance and preparation.

Siachen Ultra

The Siachen Ultra is a 180 km ultra-running race scheduled for September 2027, organised by the Ladakh Marathon as a tribute to the Indian Army's service and sacrifice in the Siachen region. Starting at Warshi Village near Siachen, the race will finish in Leh, traversing the Nubra Valley and the historic Silk Route. The course will cross Khardung La at 17,618 ft (5,370 m), with its entire length lying above 10,000 ft. Runners will face extreme altitude, long exposed stretches, steep climbs, dramatic temperature shifts and potentially sub-zero conditions, making it one of the world's toughest high-altitude running challenge. The race will have a 30-hour cutoff and will be open to a select field of experienced ultra runners meeting the Ladakh Marathon's eligibility criteria.

Recent editions

The marathon continued to grow in participation, attracting more than 6,600 runners in its 12th edition in 2025. Its 13th edition, held in September 2026, recorded approximately 7,200 participants.

== Race ==
The Ladakh Marathon is organized by the High Altitude Sports Foundation Ladakh with support from the Administration of the Union Territory of Ladakh, the Indian Army, the Indian Air Force, Ladakh Police, the Indo-Tibetan Border Police (ITBP) and the Ladakh Scouts, alongside Rimo Expeditions as the logistical supporter, local associations, village communities and other partners.

Categories

The Ladakh Marathon is made up of six categories: The Silk Route Ultra (122 km), the Khardung La Challenge (72 km), the Full Marathon (42.195 km), the Half Marathon (21.0975 km), the 11.2 km Run and the 5 km Run for Fun.

Race Day

The Ladakh Marathon is generally held during the second week of September. The race programme spans several days, with the two ultramarathons taking place first, followed by the shorter-distance events.

The Silk Route Ultra typically begins at 7:00 pm on Friday, while the Khardung La Challenge starts at 3:00 am on Saturday. The Full Marathon, Half Marathon, 11.2 km Run and 5 km Run for Fun are scheduled across the following two days.

Course

The Silk Route Ultra begins in Kyagar village and proceeds through Khalsar village to Khardung village, which is also the starting point of the Khardung La Challenge. The two ultramarathon routes then ascend towards Khardung La Top, at an elevation of approximately 17,618 feet (5,370 metres), before descending towards Leh. Both races finish at Leh Market.

The Full Marathon, Half Marathon, 11.2 km Run and 5 km Run for Fun begin and finish at the NDS Memorial Stadium in Leh, following circuit routes through the surrounding area.

The courses pass through the distinctive landscape of Ladakh, including mountain ranges, high-altitude passes, rivers, local villages and monasteries. The elevation, mountainous terrain and changing weather conditions are defining features of the event, particularly for the ultramarathon categories.

== Acclimatization ==
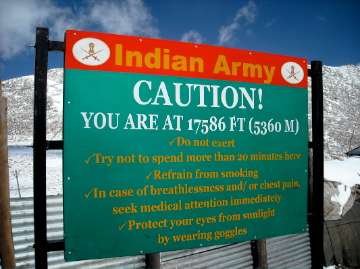
Board of Indian Army regarding caution at high altitude

Acclimatization to high altitude is an important consideration for participants in the Ladakh Marathon, as reduced oxygen availability at elevations of approximately 11,500 feet (3,500 metres) and above can cause altitude-related illness. To help runners prepare for the demands of racing in these conditions, the event provides pre-race guidance on acclimatization, training and race readiness. According to the marathon’s official website, participants in the Silk Route Ultra and the Khardung La Challenge are advised to arrive in Leh at least two weeks before race day.

This extended pre-race stay is a distinctive feature of the event. By encouraging runners to arrive in Leh well in advance, the marathon supports a longer period of visitor activity before race day. Participants may spend on accommodation, food, local transport and other services while acclimatizing and preparing for their races, contributing to the local economy.

== Race day photos ==
In the last 7 years of Ladakh Marathon, Khardungla Challenge & Silk Route Ultra, the organizers continued the partnership with marathon photography experts SplitSecondPix to provide photo technology for the event. A team of 25 photographers venture out into the extreme terrains of Ladakh to capture the action of the ultra marathon. Starting at 3am in Khardong village and temperatures of −10 °C to 17586 ft Khardung La pass and descending into the Leh Valley the photographers capture the timeless moments through its lenses. Participants can visit the event website or SplitSecondPix website to find these timeless photos on basis of their Bib number.

== Winners ==
=== The Khardung La Challenge (72 km) ===
Winners of 72 km "The Khardung La Challenge" also known as "Ultra-Marathon" are as follows.

Year	Winner	Nationality	Time	Runner up	Third place
2012	Padam Limbu	India	08:52:20	Konchok Namgail	–
2013	Rigzin Norbu	India	06:55:02	Tsering Gyatso	Stanzin Wangyal
2014	Shabbir Hussain	India	06:35:00	Rigzin Norbu	Tsering Gyatso
2015	Tsewang Todan	India	06:33:41	Rigzin Norbu	Tsering Stobgais
2016	Tsewang Tokdan	India	06:53:35	Shabbir Hussain	Mohamad Eliyas
2017	Shabir Hussain	India	06:23:50	Rigzin Narboo	Tsering Stobgyas
2018	Shabir Hussain	India	06:50:38	Rigzin Narboo	Karma Zopa
2019	Shabir Hussain	India	06:53:34	Stanzin Norboo	Rigzin Narboo

Since 2015, special 72 km Khardung La Challenge for women was started.

Women Khardung La Challenge 72 km winner

Year	Winner	Nationality	Time	Runner-up	Third place
2015	Skalzang Dolma	India	10:58:56	Khushboo Vaish	Tsetan Lamo
2016	Sonam Chuskit	India	09:41:19	Divya Vasishta	Pervin Batliwala
2017	Shikha Pahwa	India	11:05:37	Kavita Chatterjee	Deepa Bhat
2018	Konchok Dolma	India	11:11:40	Silvia Amodio	Rephica Pde
2019	Christena Walter	Ireland	10:32:44	Ashwini G Bhat	Rephica Becky Pde

=== Marathon 42 km (Women) ===
Year	Winner	Nationality	Time	Runner-up	Third place
2012	Jigmet Skitzom	India	4:51:30	Padma Lhamo	Tsetan Dolkar
2013	Tsetan Dolkar	India	4:54:05	Sonam Chuskit	Claudia Meier; Judith Klemenz
2014	Sonam Chuskit	India	4:10:12	Namgail Lhamo	Dechen Chuskit
2015	Tsetan Dolkar	India	3:40:37	Jigmet Dolma	Katharina Leuthner
2016	Tsetan Dolkar	India	3:34:24	Shikha Pahwa	Namgyal Lhamo
2017	Jigmet Dolma	India	3:18:56	Tsetan Dolkar	Sonam Chuskit
2018	Jigmet Dolma	India	3:21:27	Tsetan Dolkar	Sweta Kadian
2019	Jigmet Dolma	India	3:20:02	Tsetan Dolkar	Namgyal Lhamo
2022	Jigmet Dolma	India	3:21:19	Diskit Dolma	Tsetan Dolkar
2023	Jigmet Dolma	India	3:27:53	Disket Dolma	Deepika Prakash
2024	Disket Dolma	India	3:33:41	Jigmet Dolma	Namgyal Lhamo

=== Marathon 42 km (Men) ===
Year	Winner	Nationality	Time	Runner up	Third place
2012	Shreya Jain	India	3:36:18	Tsewang Thinlas	Rigzin Angchuk
2013	Shabir Hussain	India	3:25:33	Jigmet Norboo	Tashi Zangpo
2014	Shokat Ali	India	3:16:58	Jigmet Namgail	Mustafa Ali
2015	Fayaz Ali	India	3:02:31	Padama Namgail	Tsering Tondup
2016	Jigmet Namgial	India	3:12:06	Stanzin Nurbu	Jigmet Norboo
2017	Shabir Hussain	India	3:06:07	Manzoor Hussain	Jigmet Norboo
2018	Manzoor Hussain	India	3:13:06	Ajaz Hussain	Jigmath Kunzang
2019	Shabir Hussain	India	2:56:51	Jigmet Norboo	Manzoor Hussain
2022	Nawang Tsering	India	2:41:42	Jigmet Namgial	Shabir Hussain
2023	Nawang Tsering	India	2:42:02	Jigmet Namgail	Manzoor Hussain
2024	Nawang Tsering	India	2:44:06	Anil Jindal	Manzoor Hussain

=== Course Records ===
Race	Category	Record	Nationality	Athlete
Silk Route Ultra (122K)	Men	12:12:18	India	Nawang Tsering
Silk Route Ultra (122K)	Women	14:26:29	India	Tenzing Dolma
Khardung La Challenge (72K)	Men	5:41:36	India	Jigmet Namgail
Khardung La Challenge (72K)	Women	7:03:26	India	Deskit Dolma
Marathon (42K)	Men	2:41:42	India	Nawang Tsering
Marathon (42K)	Women	3:13:00	India	Stanzin Chondol
Half Marathon (21K)	Men	1:13:10	India	Tsetan Namgail
Half Marathon (21K)	Women	1:29:43	India	Stanzin Chondol
11.2K	Men	0:42:22	India	Sonam Stanzin
11.2K	Women	0:47:30	India	Skarma Edong Lanzes

== See also ==
- Chogyal
- Festivals in Ladakh
