= Partap Pore =

Partap Pore Partappur, Partapur
- Village
- Location in Ladakh, India Partap Pore (India)
- Coordinates: 34.6092°N 77.4541°E
- Country: India
- Union Territory: Ladakh
- District: Nubra
- Tehsil: Diskit

Population (2011)
  - Total: 3,561
- Time zone: UTC+5:30 (IST)
- Postal code: 194401
- Census code: 926

Partap Pore or Pratap Pur or Partapur is a village in the Nubra district of Ladakh, India. It is located in the Diskit tehsil near Hundar.

== Geography ==
Pratap Pur is in the Shyok river valley, adjacent to Hundar, near the confluence of the Nubra River with Shyok.

== Demographics ==
According to the 2011 census of India, Partap Pore has 197 households. The effective literacy rate (i.e. the literacy rate of population excluding children aged 6 and below) is 94.81%.

Demographics (2011 Census)
	Total	Male	Female
Population	3561	3198	363
Children aged below 6 years	94	55	39
Scheduled caste	9	9	0
Scheduled tribe	588	293	295
Literates	3287	3079	208
Workers (all)	3281	3048	233
Main workers (total)	2892	2820	72
Main workers: Cultivators	69	25	44
Main workers: Agricultural labourers	8	8	0
Main workers: Household industry workers	0	0	0
Main workers: Other	2815	2787	28
Marginal workers (total)	389	228	161
Marginal workers: Cultivators	222	63	159
Marginal workers: Agricultural labourers	2	1	1
Marginal workers: Household industry workers	0	0	0
Marginal workers: Others	165	164	1
Non-workers	280	150	130
