= Partapur =

Partapur may refer to:

- Partapur, Rajasthan, a town in Banswara district of Rajasthan
- Partapur, Uttar Pradesh, a town in Meerut district of Uttar Pradesh
- Partapur, Karnataka, a settlement in Bidar district of Karnataka
- Partap Pore, a village in Jammu and Kashmir, India
