= Nubra (disambiguation) =

Nubra may refer to:

- Nubra River, a river that flows in the northern part of the Ladakh region of India
- Nubra Valley, the valley formed by the Nubra River
- Nubra region, the historical and cultural region encompassing the Nubra Valley and a part of the Shyok Valley
- Nubra subdivision, an administrative subdivision of Ladakh
- Nubra tehsil, a tehsil of Ladakh
- Nubra district, a proposed administrative district of Ladakh announced in 2024
- Nubra (Vidhan Sabha constituency)
- Nubra pika (Ochotona nubrica), a mammal
- Adhesive bra
