= Skanpuk =

- Village
- Location in Ladakh, India Skanpuk (India)
- Coordinates: 34.6237°N 77.4350°E
- Country: India
- State: Ladakh
- District: Nubra
- Tehsil: Diskit

Population (2011)
  - Total: 416
- Time zone: UTC+5:30 (IST)
- Census code: 925

Skanpuk (Alternative spellings include Skampuk, Spanpuk and Spanduk) is a village in the Nubra district of Ladakh, India. It is located in the Diskit tehsil. It is on the way to Turtuk, Nubra.

== Geography ==
Skanpuk is in the Shyok river valley, adjacent to Hundar, close to the confluence of the Nubra river with Shyok.

Skanpuk is named after the Skanpuk peak, elevation 20,288 feet (6,184 m), below which the village sits. The surveyor William Johnson is said to have used the peak as a trigonometric station during his surveys.

== Demographics ==
According to the 2011 census of India, Skanpuk has 93 households. The effective literacy rate (i.e. the literacy rate of population excluding children aged 6 and below) is 63.32%.

Demographics (2011 Census)
	Total	Male	Female
Population	416	197	219
Children aged below 6 years	37	17	20
Scheduled caste	0	0	0
Scheduled tribe	415	197	218
Literates	240	137	103
Workers (all)	254	115	139
Main workers (total)	62	51	11
Main workers: Cultivators	8	8	0
Main workers: Agricultural labourers	1	1	0
Main workers: Household industry workers	0	0	0
Main workers: Other	53	42	11
Marginal workers (total)	192	64	128
Marginal workers: Cultivators	189	61	128
Marginal workers: Agricultural labourers	0	0	0
Marginal workers: Household industry workers	1	1	0
Marginal workers: Others	2	2	0
Non-workers	162	82	80
