= Nubra River =

River in India

Nubra River Yarma Tsangpo
- Nubra/ Shyok watershed

Location
- Country: India
- Union Territory: Ladakh
- District: Nubra

Physical characteristics
- Source: Siachen Glacier
  - location: Ladakh, India
  - coordinates: 35°12′38″N 77°11′46″E
  - elevation: 3,723 m (12,215 ft)
- Mouth: Shyok River
  - location: Near Diskit, Ladakh, India
  - coordinates: 34°35′33″N 77°34′50″E
  - elevation: 3,120 m (10,240 ft)
- Length: 90 km (56 mi)
- Basin size: 4,378 km^{2} (1,690 sq mi)

Basin features
- River system: Indus Basin

The Nubra River is a river in the Nubra district of Ladakh in India. It is a tributary of the Shyok River (a part of the Indus River system) and originates from the Siachen Glacier, the second-longest non-polar glacier in the world.

== Name ==
The name "Nubra River" derives from the broader Nubra Valley through which it flows. Historically, the river was known as Yarma Tsangpo in Tibetan. See Nubra § Etymology for further details.

== Course ==
The Siachen Glacier terminates in a snout located at around 3,723 m (12,200 ft) and two pro-glacial melt-water streams originate out of two ice caves in the region. They merge about one kilometer downstream and become the Nubra River. Numerous other glaciers of the Karakoram descend into the Nubra. It then flows between the Karakoram range and the Saltoro Mountains in a general southeasterly direction for about 90 km (56 mi) before its confluence with the Shyok River near Diskit, forming the Nubra Valley.

The side valleys of the Nubra Valley contain some 33 glaciers of varying proportions, and the heavy sediment load carried by the river from the melt-water is responsible for many glacio-fluvial deposits including braided channels, outwash plains and alluvial fans.

== Valley ==
The valley has been formed by ancient glaciers, now long receded, and has an average elevation of 4,000 m (13,000 ft) above sea level. The area has a very arid climate, and the lack of precipitation and the high elevation means that the upper reaches of the valley are nearly devoid of vegetation. At its junction with the Shyok, the sandy flats support patches of Tamarix and Myricaria. There are small villages at the foot of ravines, where poplars and willow trees grow. Small pasture fields have been enclosed on the un-denuded fans and fruit trees are grown.

== Siachen Conflict ==
The river was rafted by an Indo-German team in 1978 under the leadership of Narendra Kumar. Certain features in the maps used by the Germans led to India's understanding of cartographic aggression by Pakistan and a subsequent mountaineering reconnaissance expedition of the region was planned; which in turn led to Operation Meghdoot.

=== Ecological crisis ===
The Siachen Glacier, the source of the Nubra River, has for some time (Note: The conflict began in 1984 with India's successful Operation Meghdoot during which it gained control over all of the Siachen Glacier (unoccupied and undemarcated area). India has established control over all of the 70-kilometre-long (43 mi) Siachen Glacier and all of its tributary glaciers, as well as all the main passes and heights of the Saltoro Ridge immediately west of the glacier, including Sia La, Bilafond La, and Gyong La. Pakistan controls the glacial valleys immediately west of the Saltoro Ridge.) been the scene of conflict between India and Pakistan, and has been called the world's highest battleground. The 20,000 troops stationed on the glacier produce a lot of waste, (Note: The 20,000 troops stationed on the Siachen are supplied (flown and parachuted) thousands of tons of food and supplies every year. Indian army officials have described the Siachen as "the world’s biggest and highest garbage dump", from where nothing comes back. World Commission on Protected Areas estimates that over 2000 lbs. of human waste are dropped daily into crevasses of the glacier.) 40% of which is plastic and metal. This debris, including irreparable vehicles, war debris, parachute material, canisters, clothing, and human waste, is simply tipped into crevasses in the glacier. With no natural biodegradation taking place, the ice is being permanently contaminated by toxins such as cobalt, cadmium, and chromium. The washing of warfare clothes at hot sulfur springs near the Indian base camp also contaminates the river. The toxins will eventually reach the Indus River, with millions of downstream users potentially being impacted.

== Tourism ==
There are many monasteries (gompa) including Samstanling Monastery the main monastery in the valley and Diskit Monastery for viewing tall statue of Maitreya Buddha and Ensa Monastery. Visit Panamik village for mountain views, Yarab Tso lake, Hunder Sand Dunes for Bactrian camel safari.

== See also ==
- Geography of Ladakh
- Tourism in Ladakh
