= Tangyar =

- Village
- Location in Ladakh, India Tangyar (India)
- Coordinates: 34.26856619°N 77.86705971°E
- Country: India
- State: Ladakh
- District: Nubra
- Tehsil: Khalsar
- Elevation: 3,928 m (12,887 ft)

Population (2011)
  - Total: 184
- Time zone: UTC+5:30 (IST)
- 2011 census code: 938

Tangyar is a village in the Nubra district of Ladakh, India. It is located in the Khalsar tehsil.

== Demographics ==
According to the 2011 census of India, Tangyar has 42 households. The effective literacy rate (i.e. the literacy rate of population excluding children aged 6 and below) is 56.02%.

Demographics (2011 Census)
	Total	Male	Female
Population	184	79	105
Children aged below 6 years	18	9	9
Scheduled caste	0	0	0
Scheduled tribe	184	79	105
Literates	93	46	47
Workers (all)	135	56	79
Main workers (total)	11	6	5
Main workers: Cultivators	3	1	2
Main workers: Agricultural labourers	0	0	0
Main workers: Household industry workers	0	0	0
Main workers: Other	8	5	3
Marginal workers (total)	124	50	74
Marginal workers: Cultivators	117	46	71
Marginal workers: Agricultural labourers	1	1	0
Marginal workers: Household industry workers	0	0	0
Marginal workers: Others	6	3	3
Non-workers	49	23	26
