= Skuru =

- Village
- Location in Ladakh, India Skuru (India)
- Coordinates: 34.674458°N 77.290095°E
- Country: India
- Union Territory: Ladakh
- District: Diskit
- Tehsil: Nubra

Population (2011)
  - Total: 230
- Time zone: UTC+5:30 (IST)
- Census code: 923

Skuru is a village in the Nubra district of Ladakh, India. It is located in the Diskit tehsil.

== Demographics ==
According to the 2011 census of India, Skuru has 52 households. The effective literacy rate (i.e. the literacy rate of population excluding children aged 6 and below) is 50.24%.

Demographics (2011 Census)
	Total	Male	Female
Population	230	100	130
Children aged below 6 years	25	12	13
Scheduled caste	0	0	0
Scheduled tribe	230	100	130
Literates	103	55	48
Workers (all)	148	62	86
Main workers (total)	21	17	4
Main workers: Cultivators	2	2	0
Main workers: Agricultural labourers	0	0	0
Main workers: Household industry workers	0	0	0
Main workers: Other	19	15	4
Marginal workers (total)	127	45	82
Marginal workers: Cultivators	119	44	75
Marginal workers: Agricultural labourers	1	0	1
Marginal workers: Household industry workers	6	1	5
Marginal workers: Others	1	0	1
Non-workers	82	38	44
