= Largiab =

- Village
- Location in Ladakh, India Largiab (India)
- Coordinates: 34.6950989°N 77.1008148°E
- Country: India
- Union Territory: Ladakh
- District: Nubra
- Tehsil: Diskit
- Elevation: 4,589 m (15,056 ft)

Population (2011)
  - Total: 421
- Time zone: UTC+5:30 (IST)
- 2011 census code: 924

Largiab (also spelt Largyab) is a village in the Nubra district of Ladakh, India. It is located in the Diskit tehsil.

== Demographics ==
According to the 2011 census of India, Largiab has 89 households. The effective literacy rate (i.e. the literacy rate of population excluding children aged 6 and below) is 63.05%.

Demographics (2011 Census)
	Total	Male	Female
Population	421	219	202
Children aged below 6 years	80	43	37
Scheduled caste	0	0	0
Scheduled tribe	421	219	202
Literates	215	130	85
Workers (all)	213	104	109
Main workers (total)	29	23	6
Main workers: Cultivators	2	0	2
Main workers: Agricultural labourers	0	0	0
Main workers: Household industry workers	0	0	0
Main workers: Other	27	23	4
Marginal workers (total)	184	81	103
Marginal workers: Cultivators	168	66	102
Marginal workers: Agricultural labourers	1	0	1
Marginal workers: Household industry workers	0	0	0
Marginal workers: Others	15	15	0
Non-workers	208	115	93
