= Khemi =

Khemi kheme
- Village
- Location in Ladakh, India Khemi (India)
- Coordinates: 34.8742103°N 77.6667405°E
- Country: India
- Union Territory: Ladakh
- District: Nubra
- Tehsil: Panamik
- Elevation: 5,884 m (19,304 ft)

Population (2011)
  - Total: 576
- Time zone: UTC+5:30 (IST)
- 2011 census code: 917

Khemi or kheme is a village in the Nubra district of Ladakh, India. It is located in the Panamik tehsil.

== Demographics ==
According to the 2011 census of India, Khemi has 121 households. The effective literacy rate (i.e. the literacy rate of population excluding children aged 6 and below) is 64.71%.

Demographics (2011 Census)
	Total	Male	Female
Population	576	299	277
Children aged below 6 years	49	29	20
Scheduled caste	0	0	0
Scheduled tribe	571	298	273
Literates	341	207	134
Workers (all)	259	155	104
Main workers (total)	183	97	86
Main workers: Cultivators	140	61	79
Main workers: Agricultural labourers	0	0	0
Main workers: Household industry workers	0	0	0
Main workers: Other	43	36	7
Marginal workers (total)	76	58	18
Marginal workers: Cultivators	22	10	12
Marginal workers: Agricultural labourers	3	1	2
Marginal workers: Household industry workers	0	0	0
Marginal workers: Others	51	47	4
Non-workers	317	144	173
