= Khemakhungiu =

- Village
- Location in Ladakh, India Khemakhungiu (India)
- Coordinates: 34.245123°N 77.914352°E
- Country: India
- Union Territory: Ladakh
- District: Nubra
- Tehsil: Khalsar

Population (2011)
  - Total: 142
- Time zone: UTC+5:30 (IST)
- Census code: 937

Khemakhungiu or Khema Khungru is a village in the Nubra district of Ladakh, India. It is located in the Khalsar tehsil.

== Demographics ==
According to the 2011 census of India, Khemakhungiu has 38 households. The effective literacy rate (i.e. the literacy rate of population excluding children aged 6 and below) is 52.38%.

Demographics (2011 Census)
	Total	Male	Female
Population	142	63	79
Children aged below 6 years	16	6	10
Scheduled caste	0	0	0
Scheduled tribe	142	63	79
Literates	66	42	24
Workers (all)	108	50	58
Main workers (total)	63	33	30
Main workers: Cultivators	46	20	26
Main workers: Agricultural labourers	0	0	0
Main workers: Household industry workers	0	0	0
Main workers: Other	17	13	4
Marginal workers (total)	45	17	28
Marginal workers: Cultivators	42	16	26
Marginal workers: Agricultural labourers	0	0	0
Marginal workers: Household industry workers	0	0	0
Marginal workers: Others	3	1	2
Non-workers	34	13	21
