= Kunchang Kangri =

Mountain peak

- Location within India Location within Ladakh

Highest point
- Elevation: 6,751 m (22,149 ft)
- Prominence: 988 m (3,241 ft)
- Coordinates: 34°49′29.829″N 77°29′5.548″E

Geography
- Location: Ladakh

Climbing
- First ascent: July 22, 2018 by an Estonian team

Kunchang Kangri is a mountain peak located at 6,751m (22,149ft) above sea level in the easternmost subrange of the Karakoram range in India.

== Location ==
The peak is located east of Tegar, a high-altitude village in Nubra subdivision in the Leh district of Union territory of Ladakh (India). The prominence is 988 m (3,241 ft).

== First ascent ==
On July 22, 2018; an Estonian Karakorum expedition team consisting of Kristjan-Erik Suurväli, (group leader), Sven Oja (frontrunner), Priit Joosu, Lauri Ehrenpreis, Meelis Luukas, Priit Simson and Lauri Stern reached the summit.
