= Lakjung =

- Village
- Location in Ladakh, India Lakjung (India)
- Coordinates: 34.5201835°N 77.7276687°E
- Country: India
- Union Territory: Ladakh
- District: Nubra
- Tehsil: Sumoor
- Elevation: 3,777 m (12,392 ft)

Population (2011)
  - Total: 514
- Time zone: UTC+5:30 (IST)
- 2011 census code: 933

Lakjung is a village in the Nubra district of Ladakh, India. It is located in the Sumoor tehsil.

== Demographics ==
According to the 2011 census of India, Lakjung has 105 households. The effective literacy rate (i.e. the literacy rate of population excluding children aged 6 and below) is 60.61%.

Demographics (2011 Census)
	Total	Male	Female
Population	514	226	288
Children aged below 6 years	57	28	29
Scheduled caste	2	2	0
Scheduled tribe	511	223	288
Literates	277	139	138
Workers (all)	201	143	58
Main workers (total)	107	52	55
Main workers: Cultivators	49	18	31
Main workers: Agricultural labourers	0	0	0
Main workers: Household industry workers	1	1	0
Main workers: Other	57	33	24
Marginal workers (total)	94	91	3
Marginal workers: Cultivators	74	72	2
Marginal workers: Agricultural labourers	0	0	0
Marginal workers: Household industry workers	0	0	0
Marginal workers: Others	20	19	1
Non-workers	313	83	230
