= Kubed, Ladakh =

Kubed
- Village
- Location in Ladakh, India Kubed (India)
- Coordinates: 34.152466°N 77.576325°E
- Country: India
- Union Territory: Ladakh
- District: Nubra
- Tehsil: Panamik

Population (2011)
  - Total: 824
- Time zone: UTC+5:30 (IST)
- 2011 census code: 919

Kubed is a village in the Nubra district of Ladakh, India. It is located in the Panamik tehsil.

== Demographics ==
According to the 2011 census of India, Kubed has 210 households. The effective literacy rate (i.e. the literacy rate of population excluding children aged 6 and below) is 58.53%.

Demographics (2011 Census)
	Total	Male	Female
Population	824	385	439
Children aged below 6 years	103	53	50
Scheduled caste	0	0	0
Scheduled tribe	818	380	438
Literates	422	231	191
Workers (all)	411	214	197
Main workers (total)	68	42	26
Main workers: Cultivators	0	0	0
Main workers: Agricultural labourers	0	0	0
Main workers: Household industry workers	0	0	0
Main workers: Other	68	42	26
Marginal workers (total)	343	172	171
Marginal workers: Cultivators	245	82	163
Marginal workers: Agricultural labourers	4	2	2
Marginal workers: Household industry workers	0	0	0
Marginal workers: Others	94	88	6
Non-workers	413	171	242
