= Digger, Ladakh =

Digger Digar, Degar
- Village
- Location in Ladakh, India Digger (India)
- Coordinates: 34.292750°N 77.806592°E
- Country: India
- Union Territory: Ladakh
- District: Nubra
- Tehsil: Khalsar

Population (2011)
  - Total: 192
- Time zone: UTC+5:30 (IST)
- PIN: 194101
- Census code: 936

Digger is a village in the Nubra district of Ladakh, India. It is located in the Khalsar tehsil.

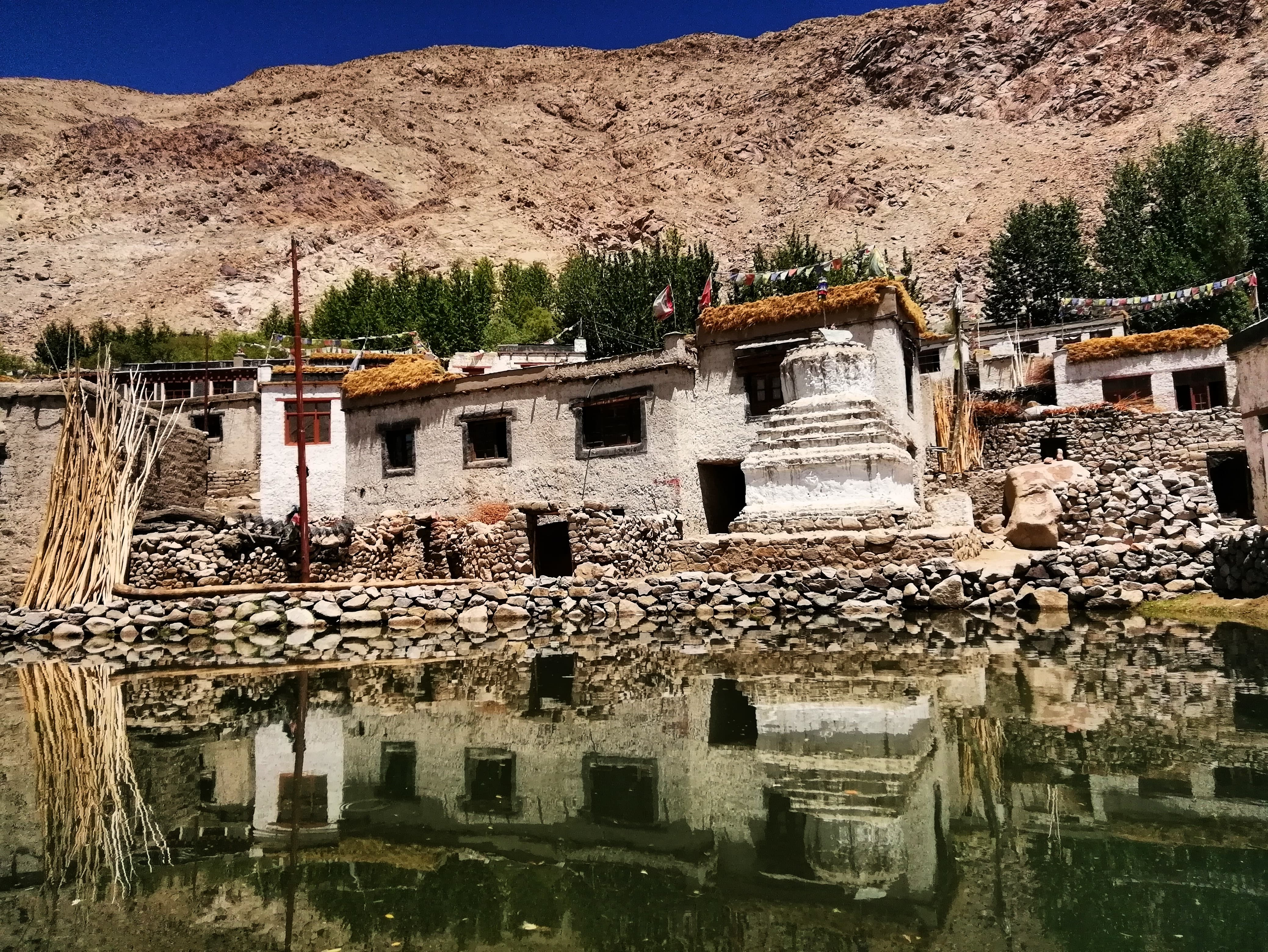
View of Digger village from the bank of a small pond located at the center of the village.

== Demographics ==
According to the 2011 census of India, Digger has 53 households. The effective literacy rate (i.e. the literacy rate of population excluding children aged 6 and below) is 45.56%.

Demographics (2011 Census)
	Total	Male	Female
Population	192	86	106
Children aged below 6 years	23	12	11
Scheduled caste	0	0	0
Scheduled tribe	192	86	106
Literates	77	32	45
Workers (all)	119	55	64
Main workers (total)	13	10	3
Main workers: Cultivators	0	0	0
Main workers: Agricultural labourers	0	0	0
Main workers: Household industry workers	2	2	0
Main workers: Other	11	8	3
Marginal workers (total)	106	45	61
Marginal workers: Cultivators	105	44	61
Marginal workers: Agricultural labourers	0	0	0
Marginal workers: Household industry workers	0	0	0
Marginal workers: Others	1	1	0
Non-workers	73	31	42
