= Warisfistan =

- Village
- Location in Ladakh, India Warisfistan (India)
- Coordinates: 34.8602102°N 77.1347332°E
- Country: India
- Union Territory: Ladakh
- District: Nubra
- Tehsil: Diskit

Population (2011)
  - Total: 258
- Time zone: UTC+5:30 (IST)
- Census code: 916

Warisfistan is a village in the Nubra district of Ladakh, India. It is located in the Diskit tehsil, on the bank of Siachin glacier. The Chogling Gompa is located nearby.

== Demographics ==
According to the 2011 census of India, Warisfistan has 52 households. The effective literacy rate (i.e. the literacy rate of population excluding children aged 6 and below) is 35.19%.

Demographics (2011 Census)
	Total	Male	Female
Population	258	139	119
Children aged below 6 years	25	9	16
Scheduled caste	0	0	0
Scheduled tribe	258	139	119
Literates	82	55	27
Workers (all)	154	80	74
Main workers (total)	0	0	0
Main workers: Cultivators	0	0	0
Main workers: Agricultural labourers	0	0	0
Main workers: Household industry workers	0	0	0
Main workers: Other	0	0	0
Marginal workers (total)	154	80	74
Marginal workers: Cultivators	153	79	74
Marginal workers: Agricultural labourers	1	1	0
Marginal workers: Household industry workers	0	0	0
Marginal workers: Others	0	0	0
Non-workers	104	59	45
