= Hundar Dok =

Hundar Dok Hundar Dog
- Village
- Location in Ladakh, India Hundar Dok (India)
- Coordinates: 34.528664°N 77.429333°E
- Country: India
- Union Territory: Ladakh
- District: Nubra
- Tehsil: Diskit

Population (2011)
  - Total: 95
- Time zone: UTC+5:30 (IST)
- Census code: 927

Hundar Dok is a village in the Nubra district of Ladakh, India. It is located in the Diskit tehsil.

== Demographics ==
According to the 2011 census of India, Hundar Dok has 21 households. The effective literacy rate (i.e. the literacy rate of population excluding children aged 6 and below) is 48.91%.

Demographics (2011 Census)
	Total	Male	Female
Population	95	46	49
Children aged below 6 years	3	1	2
Scheduled caste	0	0	0
Scheduled tribe	94	46	48
Literates	45	25	20
Workers (all)	65	34	31
Main workers (total)	1	0	1
Main workers: Cultivators	0	0	0
Main workers: Agricultural labourers	0	0	0
Main workers: Household industry workers	0	0	0
Main workers: Other	1	0	1
Marginal workers (total)	64	34	30
Marginal workers: Cultivators	59	30	29
Marginal workers: Agricultural labourers	0	0	0
Marginal workers: Household industry workers	0	0	0
Marginal workers: Others	5	4	1
Non-workers	30	12	18
