= Terchey =

Terchey Tirchy
- Village
- Location in Ladakh, India Terchey (India)
- Coordinates: 34.609844°N 77.271752°E
- Country: India
- Union Territory: Ladakh
- District: Nubra
- Tehsil: Diskit

Population (2011)
  - Total: 270
- Time zone: UTC+5:30 (IST)
- Census code: 922

Terchey is a village in the Nubra district of Ladakh, India. It is located in the Diskit tehsil.

== Demographics ==
According to the 2011 census of India, Terchey has 57 households. The effective literacy rate (i.e. the literacy rate of population excluding children aged 6 and below) is 62%.

Demographics (2011 Census)
	Total	Male	Female
Population	270	136	134
Children aged below 6 years	20	15	5
Scheduled caste	0	0	0
Scheduled tribe	267	135	132
Literates	155	91	64
Workers (all)	175	81	94
Main workers (total)	30	21	9
Main workers: Cultivators	0	0	0
Main workers: Agricultural labourers	0	0	0
Main workers: Household industry workers	0	0	0
Main workers: Other	30	21	9
Marginal workers (total)	145	60	85
Marginal workers: Cultivators	140	59	81
Marginal workers: Agricultural labourers	1	0	1
Marginal workers: Household industry workers	2	1	1
Marginal workers: Others	2	0	2
Non-workers	95	55	40
