= Udmaru =

- Village
- Location in Ladakh, India Udmaru (India)
- Coordinates: 34.703553°N 77.268755°E
- Country: India
- Union Territory: Ladakh
- District: Nubra
- Tehsil: Diskit

Population (2011)
  - Total: 378
- Time zone: UTC+5:30 (IST)
- Census code: 921

Udmaru is a village in the Nubra district of Ladakh, India. It is located in the Diskit tehsil, on the banks of Shyok River.

== Demographics ==
According to the 2011 census of India, Udmaru has 84 households. The effective literacy rate (i.e. the literacy rate of population excluding children aged 6 and below) is 50.29%.

Demographics (2011 Census)
	Total	Male	Female
Population	378	180	198
Children aged below 6 years	30	21	9
Scheduled caste	0	0	0
Scheduled tribe	377	180	197
Literates	175	103	72
Workers (all)	257	121	136
Main workers (total)	251	118	133
Main workers: Cultivators	235	109	126
Main workers: Agricultural labourers	0	0	0
Main workers: Household industry workers	5	2	3
Main workers: Other	11	7	4
Marginal workers (total)	6	3	3
Marginal workers: Cultivators	6	3	3
Marginal workers: Agricultural labourers	0	0	0
Marginal workers: Household industry workers	0	0	0
Marginal workers: Others	0	0	0
Non-workers	121	59	62
