= Hundur Monastery =

Buddhist monastery in Ladakh, India

Hundar Gompa
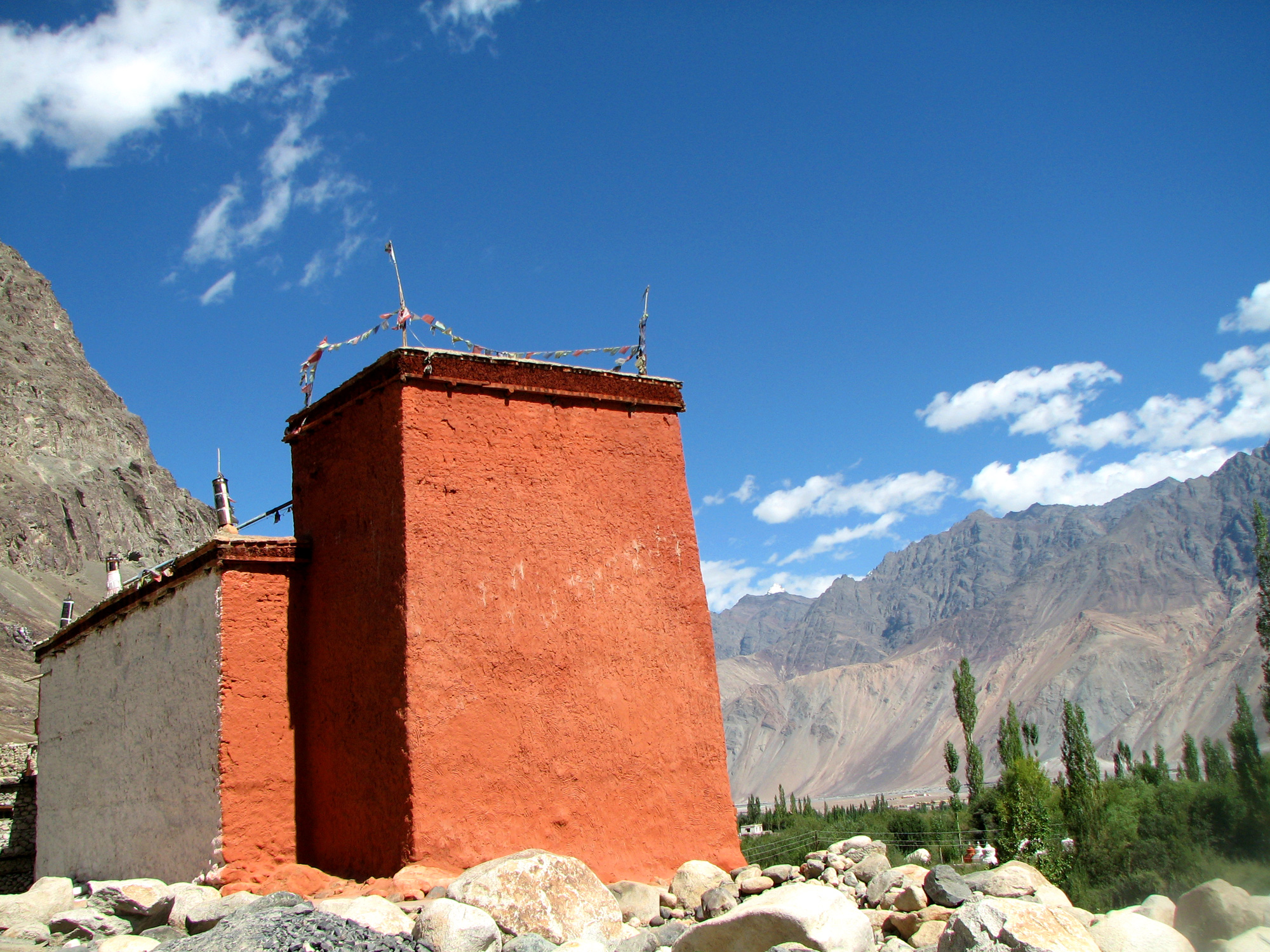

- Location within Ladakh

Religion
- Affiliation: Tibetan Buddhism

Location
- Location: Hundar, Nubra Valley, Ladakh, India
- Interactive map of Hundar Gompa
- Coordinates: 34.5828475°N 77.4588708°E

Architecture
- Style: Gompa

Hundar Monastery, also known as Hundar Gompa and Deachen Tsemo Monastery, is a Buddhist monastery in Hundar village, in the Nubra Valley of Ladakh, northern India. It is located 6 km west of the Diskit Monastery (just northeast of the bridge on Diskit-Thoise Road) & 19 km east of Thoise.

== See also ==
- List of buddhist monasteries in Ladakh
- Tourism in Ladakh
