= Nubra district =

District of Ladakh, India

- District of Ladakh
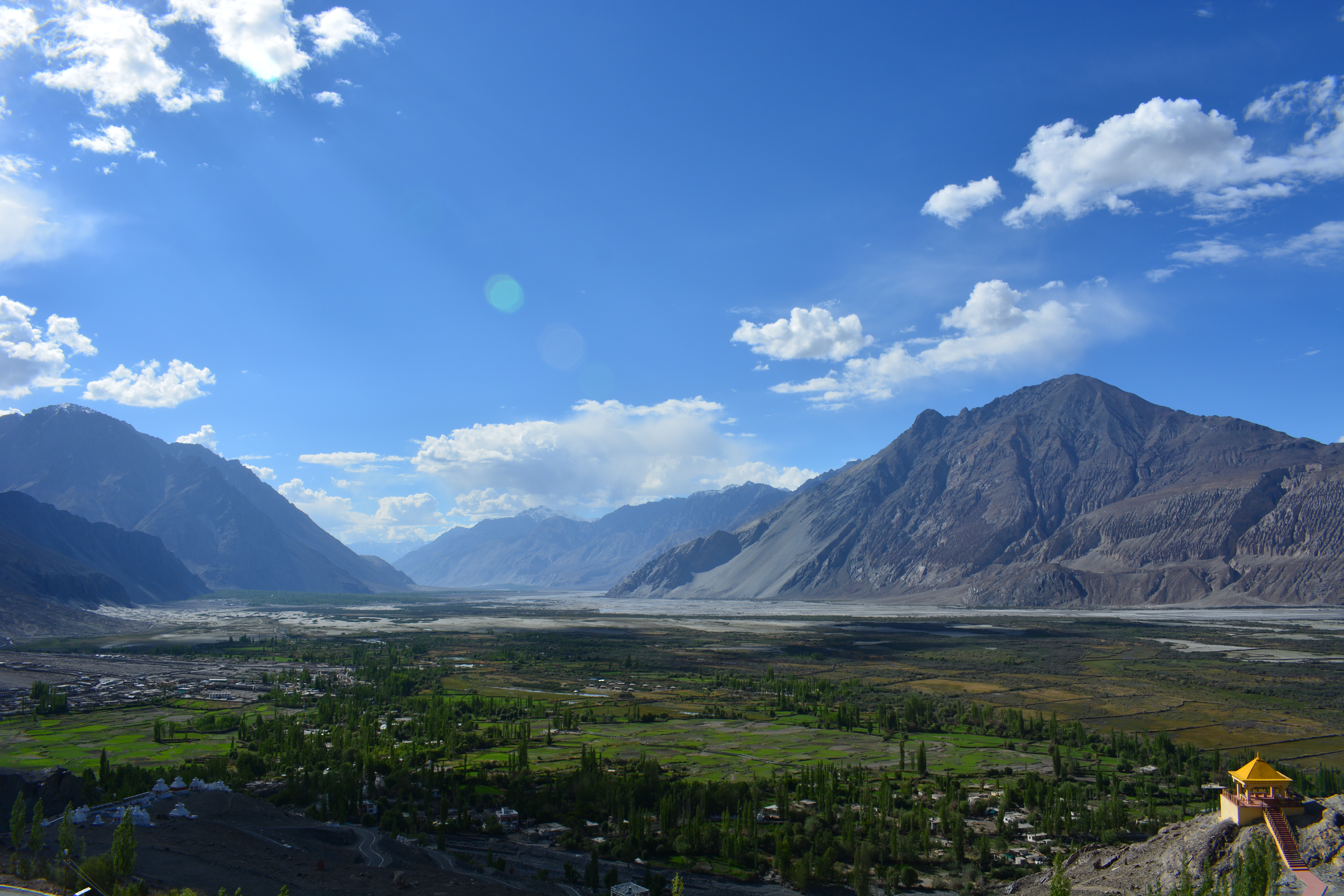
- View over Diskit in Nubra Valley
- Interactive map of Nubra district
- Coordinates: 34°34′N 77°33′E
- Country: India
- Union Territory: Ladakh
- Headquarter: Diskit
- Established: 27 April 2026

Government
  - Deputy Commissioner: Sh. Mukul Beniwal IAS
  - Lok Sabha constituencies: Ladakh
  - MP: Mohmad Haneefa

Area
  - Total: 11,500 km^{2} (4,400 sq mi)

Population (2011)
  - Total: 22,433

Languages
  - Official: Hindi, English, Ladakhi, Urdu and Purgi
  - Spoken: Shina, Balti, Tibetan
- Time zone: UTC+05:30 (IST)

Nubra district, with headquarter at Diskit, is a district in the Union Territory of Ladakh in India.

== History ==
In the past, the villages in Nubra valley were used as stopovers on the Silk route for caravans traveling through Central Asia and Kashmir. Panamic was the primary stopover point for the Caravan. It acted as the final important village where the caravans received feedback before crossing the Saseer and Karakoram passes to Central Asia.

Earlier announced on 26th August 2024 as a new district was awaiting the formal notification for the creation.On 27th April 2026, 5 new districts were notified in the government gazette for boosting the service delivery and infrastructure, including Nubra district with 30 revenue villages.

== Geography ==
Nubra, with an average elevation of more than 10,000 feet above sea level, is situated in the northern part of East Ladakh, between Karakoram and Ladakh Ranges of Himalayas. One of the main draws of Nubra is the Khardung La pass, the highest motorable road at 18,380 feet, along with stunning peaks, glaciers, enchanting valleys, and villages.

This district covers the Siachin glacier, Daulat Beg Oldie, etc.

=== Climate ===
The fertile soil in the soft climate areas of Ladakh results in thicker vegetation compared to other areas. Shrubs, bushes, and trees thrive in large quantities in locations with available water sources. Because of this factor, Nubra has earned its rightful name- Ldumra. Shyok and Siachan rivers create a significant drainage channel in Nubra. Nubra is a wide valley surrounded by high mountains on all sides. The valley becomes more attractive where the two rivers converge. The creation of the Central portion of Nubra occurs in that location as well. Diskit serves as the headquarters of the Nubra Sub-Division. Diskit Gonpa is located at an elevation of approximately 200 meters. On the rocky mountain spur above the village, there is a prominent point with a clear view over the central part of Nubra.

== Administration ==
Sub–divisions, Blocks and Villages in Nubra district
Current district	Sub-Division	Tehsil	Blocks	Villages
Nubra district	Nubra	Diskit	Diskit	Diskit, Hundar, Skampuk, Hundar Dok, Hundri, Largyab, Partapur, Skuru, Terchey, Udmaru, Bogdang, Waris Fastan
Nubra district	Nubra	Khalsar	Khalsar	Diger, Khardong, Tangyar, Khema Khungru, Khalsar
Nubra district	Nubra	Turtuk	Turtuk	Chulungkha, Tyakshi-A, Tyakshi-B, Thanga, Turtuk Yul, Turtuk Farol
Nubra district	Nubra	Sumoor	Sumoor	Sumoor, Tiggar, Lakjung
Nubra district	Nubra	Charasa	Charasa	Chamshan Charasa
Nubra district	Nubra	Panamik	Panamik	Kheme, Kubed, Panamik
Total	1	6	6	30

== Demographics ==
Based on the population of the erstwhile Nubra tehsil in the 2011 Census of India, the region corresponding to the present district had a population of 22,433. The district is sparsely populated and predominantly rural, with Diskit serving as its administrative headquarters.

== Politics ==
=== Parliamentary Constituency ===
The district falls under Ladakh Lok Sabha constituency. The present Member of Parliament (MP) of Ladakh is Mohmad Haneefa (independent candidate).

=== Autonomous Hill Council ===
Nubra District is administered by an elected body known as the Ladakh Autonomous Hill Development Council, Nubra. The LAHDC was established in 2026.

== Tourism ==
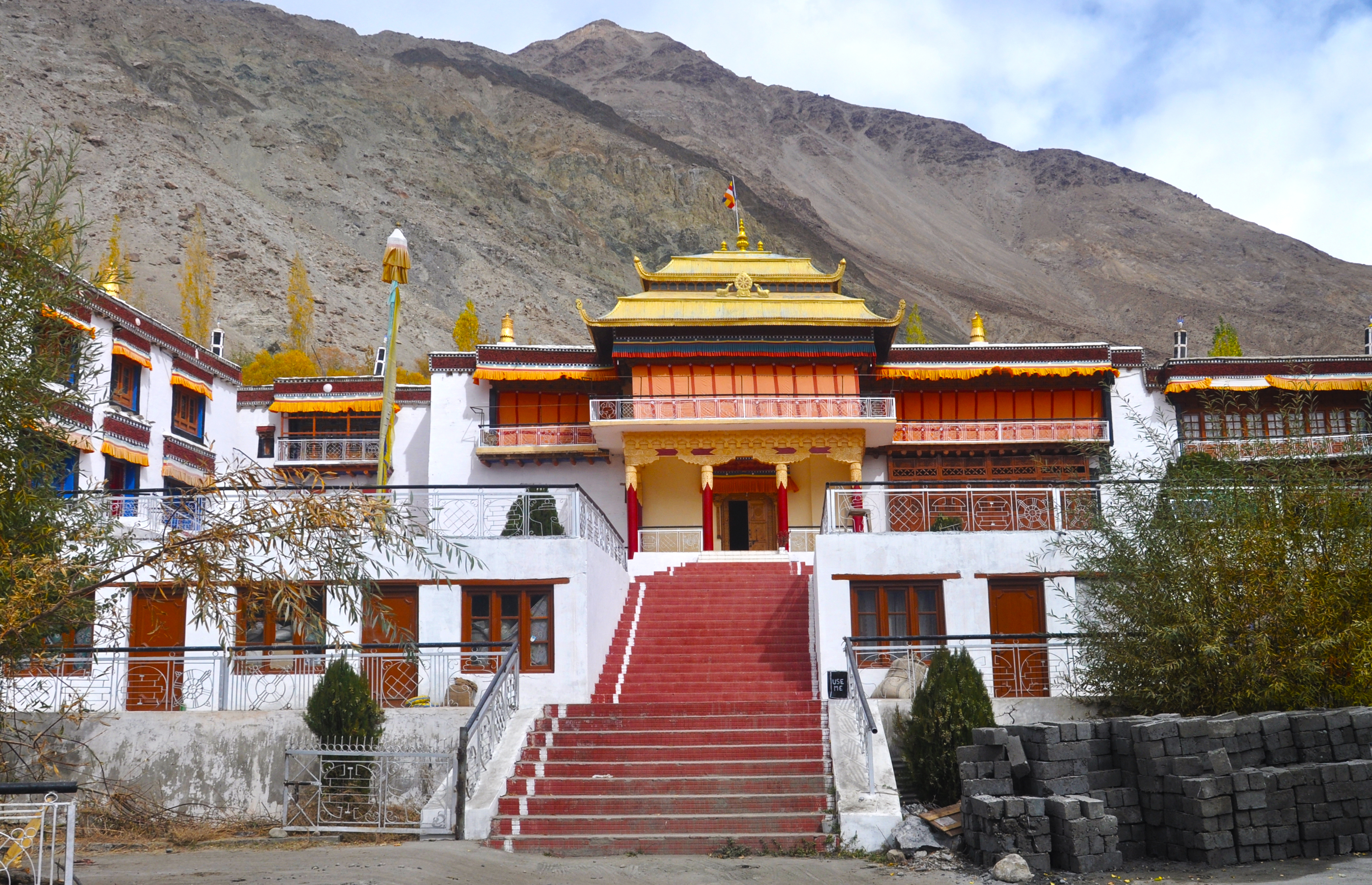
Samstanling Gompa (or Samtanling Monastery), founded around 1842 by Lama Tsultim Nyima as a Tibetan Buddhist monastery in Sumur village, features a collection of frescoes, tangkhas, and Buddha idols.

Diskit and Samstanling Monastery, Panamik hot spring, two-humped Bactrian camel ride, white-water rafting, hiking, and relaxing in the sand dunes at Hunder are also popular tourist attractions. This region is commonly referred to as Ldumra or the valley of gardens and blooms.

Samstanling Monastery is located to the North, overlooking Diskit Monastery. This monastery holds equal significance and is especially valued for its location at a picturesque viewpoint in the foothills of the Karakoram ranges, overlooking Tegar and Sumoor villages, surrounded by water and lush vegetation. All the main villages including Kardong, Tirit, Sumoor, Tegar Pinchemik, Tirisha, and Panamik are situated along the historic silk route.

Panamic Hot sulphur springs is used for bathing, drinking water, and therapeutic reasons. Panamik still possesses its charm and potential to accommodate travelers. The beauty and welcoming atmosphere of the area are enhanced by the presence of surrounding attractions like Iantsa Gonpa and Murgi waterfall.

== Transport ==
=== Air ===
Nearest airport is Kushok Bakula Rinpoche Airport, Leh.

=== Rail ===
Nearest railway station is Jammu Tawi which is 705 km from Leh town.

=== Road ===
Nubra district is at a distance of 95 km from Leh town.

== See also ==
- List of districts of Ladakh
- Geography of Ladakh
- Tourism in Ladakh
