= Chamshan Charasa =

- Village
- Location in Ladakh, India Chamshan Charasa (India)
- Coordinates: 34.725985°N 78.004631°E
- Country: India
- Union Territory: Ladakh
- District: Charasa
- Tehsil: Nubra

Population (2011)
  - Total: 717
- Time zone: UTC+5:30 (IST)
- Census code: 930

Chamshan Charasa is a village in the Nubra district of Ladakh, India. It is located in the Charasa tehsil. The road to Chamshen Valley is accessible year-round.

== Demographics ==
According to the 2011 census of India, Chamshan Charasa has 180 households. The effective literacy rate (i.e. the literacy rate of population excluding children aged 6 and below) is 56.8%.

Demographics (2011 Census)
	Total	Male	Female
Population	717	336	381
Children aged below 6 years	85	41	44
Scheduled caste	0	0	0
Scheduled tribe	716	335	381
Literates	359	195	164
Workers (all)	422	196	226
Main workers (total)	61	39	22
Main workers: Cultivators	5	3	2
Main workers: Agricultural labourers	0	0	0
Main workers: Household industry workers	0	0	0
Main workers: Other	56	36	20
Marginal workers (total)	361	157	204
Marginal workers: Cultivators	299	107	192
Marginal workers: Agricultural labourers	2	1	1
Marginal workers: Household industry workers	9	4	5
Marginal workers: Others	51	45	6
Non-workers	295	140	155
