= Partapur, Karnataka =

Partapur is a village in Bidar district of the state of Karnataka, India. According to 2011 Census information, the location code or village code of Partapur is 599747. Partapur is located in Basavakalyan Tehsil of Bidar district in Karnataka, India. It is situated 3 km (1.9 mi) from sub-district headquarters Basavakalyan and 85 km (53 mi) away from district headquarters Bidar. As per 2009 stats, Partapur village is also a gram panchayat.

The total geographical area of village is 2,187.84 hectares (8.4473 sq mi). Partapur has a total population of 5,077 people. There are about 903 houses in Partapur village. Basavakalyan is the nearest town to Partapur, and is approximately 3 km (1.9 mi) away.
