= Sumoor =

Sumoor Sum-yur
- Village and Tehsil
- Location in Ladakh, India Sumoor (India)
- Coordinates: 34.5973014°N 77.8584365°E
- Country: India
- Union Territory: Ladakh
- District: Nubra
- Tehsil: Sumoor
- Elevation: 6,033 m (19,793 ft)

Population (2011)
  - Total: 711
- Time zone: UTC+5:30 (IST)
- 2011 census code: 932

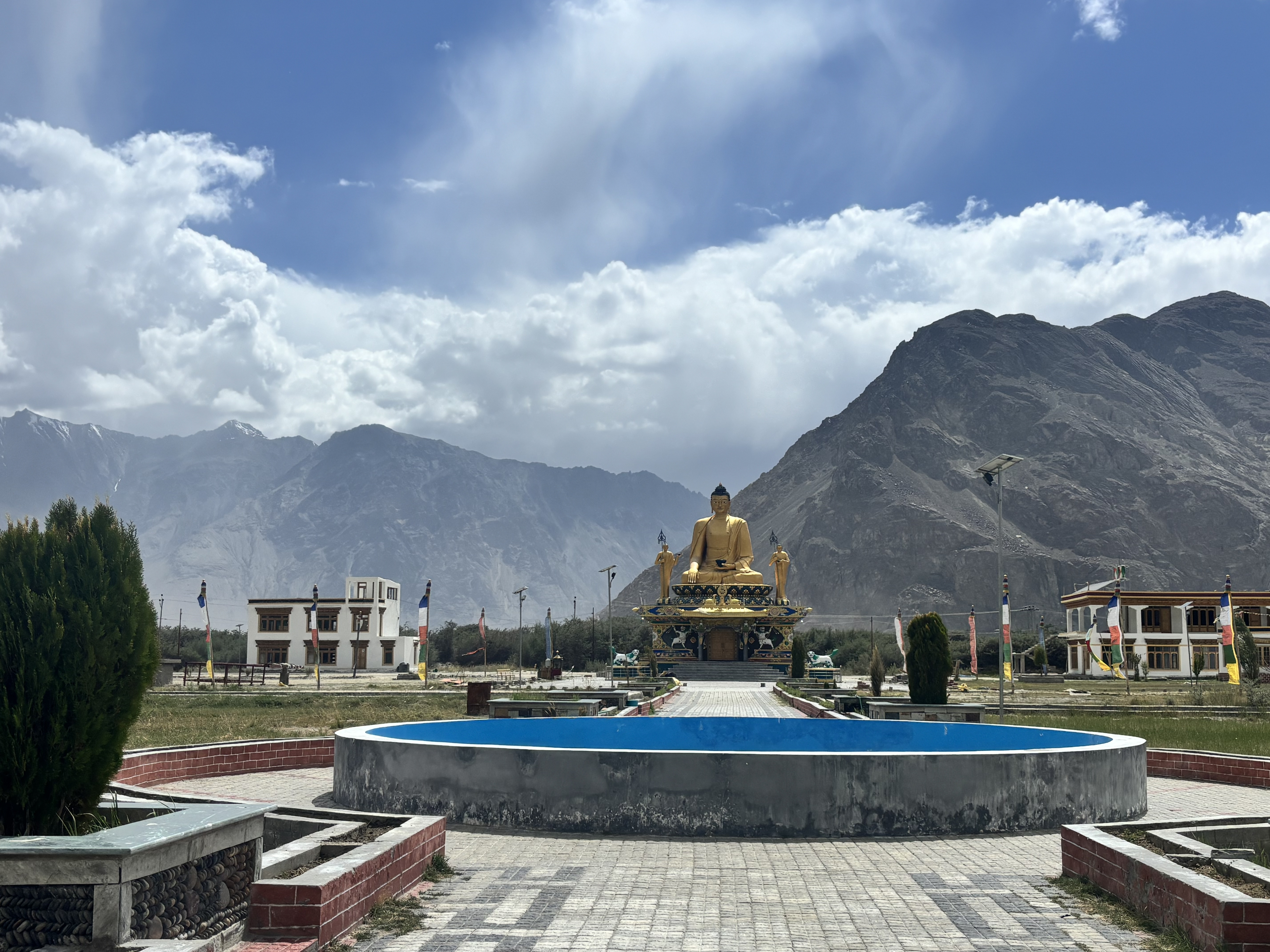
Buddha Eco Park is a tourist attraction in Sumoor.

Sumoor is a village and tehsil in the Nubra district of Ladakh, India.

== Etymology ==
'Sum' in Ladakhi is three and 'yur'means stream or channel. It is said that there use to three major streams in the village and the name is driven from this. Some people also speculate that it is Sum_Yul, meaning three villages.

== History ==
Historically this village seems to be on the ancient trade route connecting Khasgar in China to Ladakh in India. There is an ancient fort at the top of the hill just above the monastery. The monastery is one of the biggest in the Nubra Valley, which was founded by Lama Tsultim Nima around 1830s. There is huge rock carving dating from the 8-9th century AD. The village is the largest in terms of population in the whole Saichen belt. During the long winters people of the village observe various traditional cultural practices.

== Demographics ==
According to the 2011 census of India, Sumoor has 164 households. The effective literacy rate (i.e. the literacy rate of population excluding children aged 6 and below) is 66.14%.

Demographics (2011 Census)
	Total	Male	Female
Population	711	385	326
Children aged below 6 years	76	36	40
Scheduled caste	0	0	0
Scheduled tribe	678	358	320
Literates	420	260	160
Workers (all)	251	185	66
Main workers (total)	120	83	37
Main workers: Cultivators	2	2	0
Main workers: Agricultural labourers	2	1	1
Main workers: Household industry workers	5	5	0
Main workers: Other	111	75	36
Marginal workers (total)	131	102	29
Marginal workers: Cultivators	98	81	17
Marginal workers: Agricultural labourers	16	6	10
Marginal workers: Household industry workers	1	1	0
Marginal workers: Others	16	14	2
Non-workers	460	200	260

== Tourism ==
Sumoor also has sand dunes at the end of the village, where tourists can have camel rides. There is a Eco Buddha park in the village adjacent to the sand dunes as well. Sumoor has the highest petroglyp site, beside these, there are numerous Rock Art around the village. The Mayaal Fort complex, with unique double ramparts make Sumoor a treasure trove for Art, History and Cultural Tourists. The Samstanling Monastery at the top of the village, along with unique Nyigma Onpo Chappal are testimony of rich Buddhist Heritage. Interestingly, Sumoor has an old Masjid, dedicated to a lady saint and some finest Musicians tracing their ancestry to Baltistan.
