= Khardong, Ladakh =

Khardong
- Village
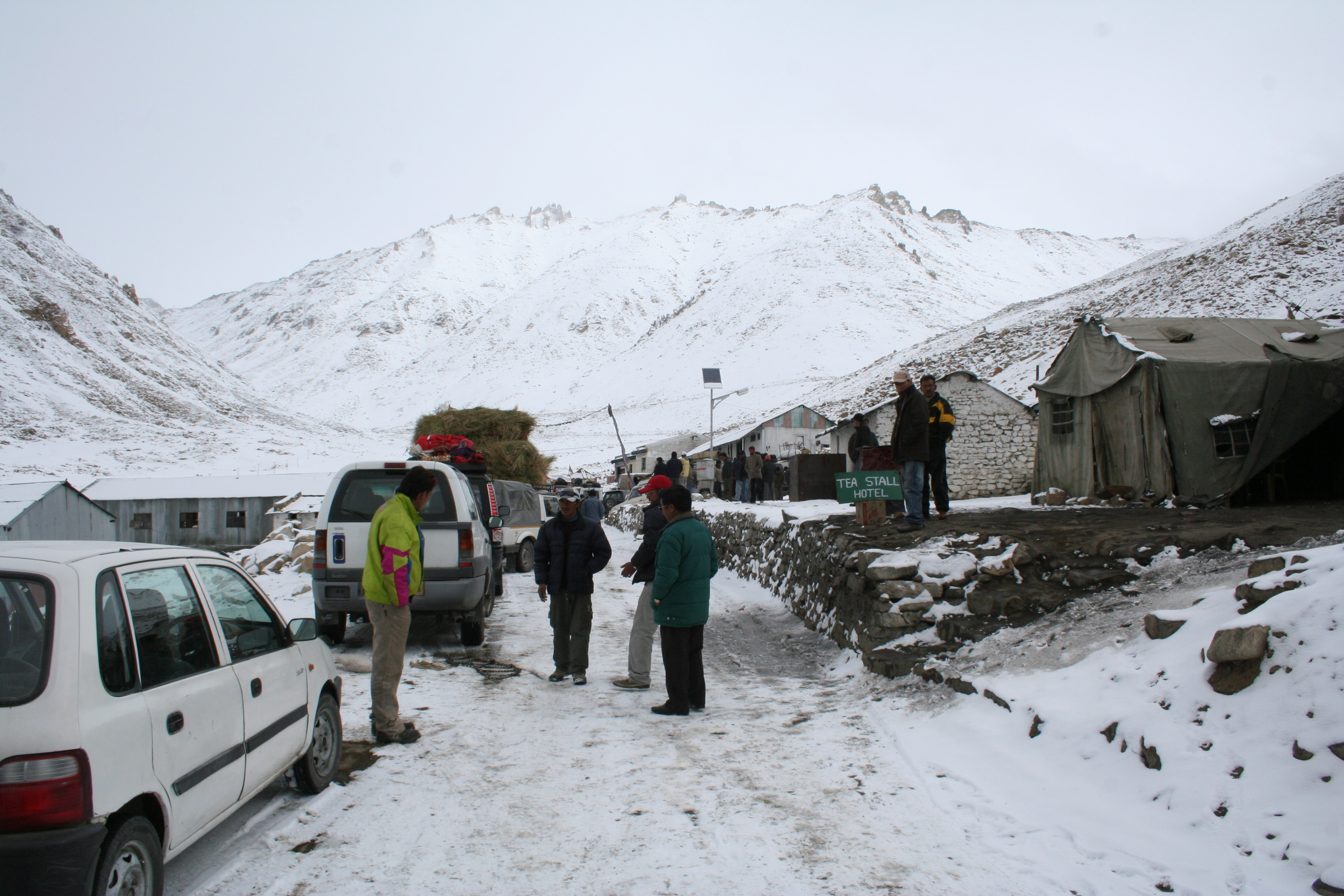
- Khardung La mountain pass

- Location in Ladakh, India Khardong (India)
- Coordinates: 34.400°N 77.656°E
- Country: India
- Union Territory: Ladakh
- District: Nubra
- Tehsil: Khalsar
- Elevation: 3,975 m (13,041 ft)

Population (2011)
  - Total: 468
- Time zone: UTC+5:30 (IST)
- 2011 census code: 935

Khardong is an emerging town in Khalsar tehsil in the Nubra district of Ladakh, India. It is located 31 km north of Khardung La.

== Demographics ==
According to the 2011 census of India, Khardong has 144 households. The effective literacy rate (i.e. the literacy rate of population excluding children aged 6 and below) is 35.81%.

Demographics (2011 Census)
	Total	Male	Female
Population	468	227	241
Children aged below 6 years	38	19	19
Scheduled caste	0	0	0
Scheduled tribe	466	225	241
Literates	154	97	57
Workers (all)	317	149	168
Main workers (total)	80	56	24
Main workers: Cultivators	0	0	0
Main workers: Agricultural labourers	0	0	0
Main workers: Household industry workers	0	0	0
Main workers: Other	80	56	24
Marginal workers (total)	237	93	144
Marginal workers: Cultivators	211	68	143
Marginal workers: Agricultural labourers	0	0	0
Marginal workers: Household industry workers	0	0	0
Marginal workers: Others	26	25	1
Non-workers	151	78	73
