= Hundar, India =

Hundar Hunder, Hundur
- Village
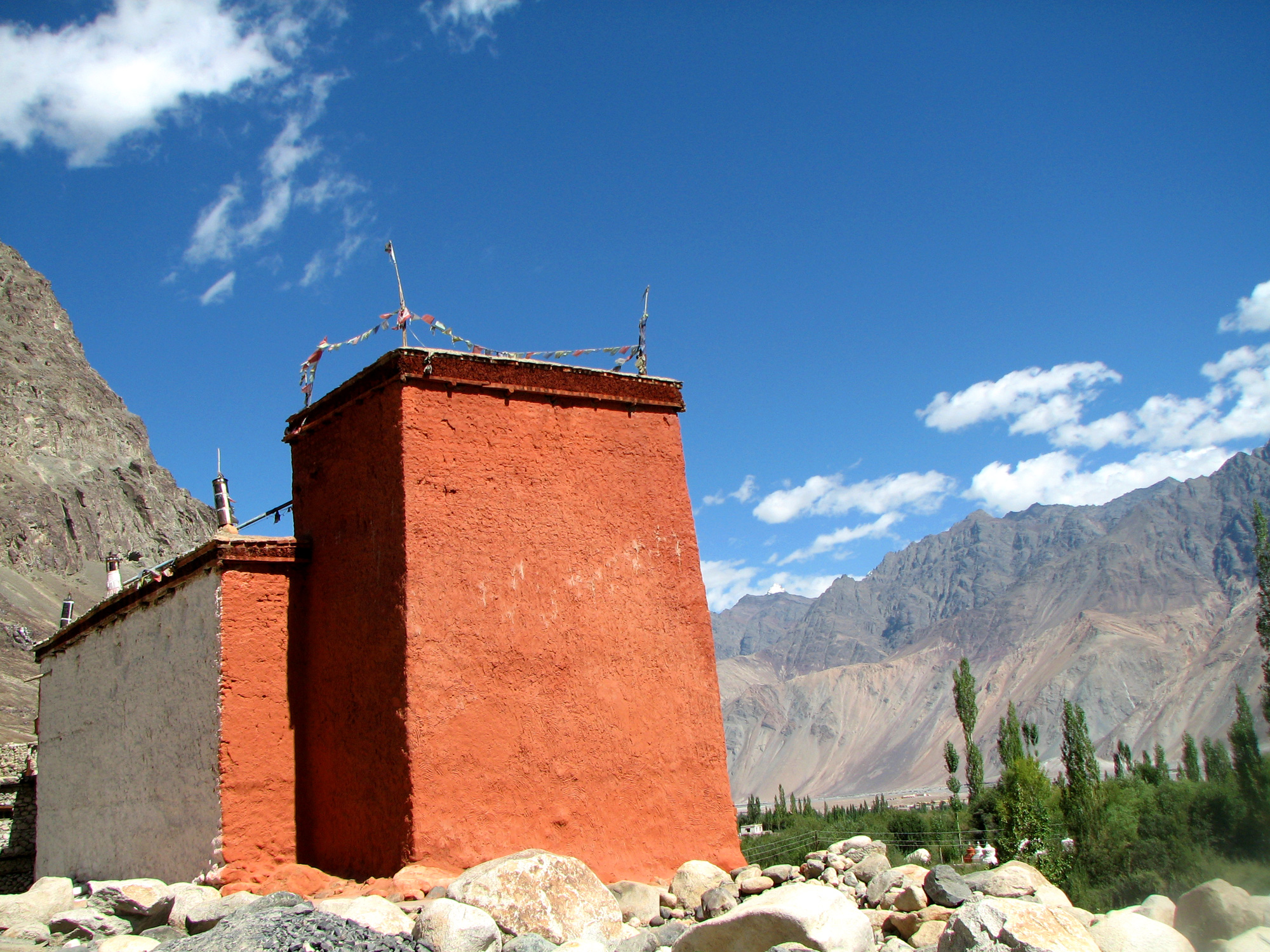
- Hunder Monastery

- Location in Ladakh, India Hundar (India)
- Coordinates: 34.575836°N 77.494823°E
- Country: India
- Union Territory: Ladakh
- District: Nubra
- Tehsil: Diskit

Population (2011)
  - Total: 1,179
- Time zone: UTC+5:30 (IST)
- Census code: 928

Hundar is a village in the Nubra district of Ladakh, India, famous for sand dunes and Bactrian camels. It is located in the Diskit tehsil, on the banks of the Shyok River. The Hunder Monastery is located here.

Hundar was once the capital of the former Nubra kingdom. There are several ruined buildings, including the ruins of the king's palace, the Langchen Khar ("Elephant Palace"). There is a fort at the top of the hill, called Gula. Hundar also has two Buddhist temples: the white temple (Lhakhang Karpo) and the red temple (Lhakhang Marpo). Between Hundar and Diskit lie sand dunes.

== Demographics ==
According to the 2011 census of India, Hundar has 269 households. The effective literacy rate (i.e. the literacy rate of population excluding children aged 6 and below) is 60.65%.

Demographics (2011 Census)
	Total	Male	Female
Population	1179	548	631
Children aged below 6 years	137	54	83
Scheduled caste	0	0	0
Scheduled tribe	1170	540	630
Literates	632	341	291
Workers (all)	728	341	387
Main workers (total)	267	169	98
Main workers: Cultivators	7	6	1
Main workers: Agricultural labourers	1	1	0
Main workers: Household industry workers	1	1	0
Main workers: Other	258	161	97
Marginal workers (total)	461	172	289
Marginal workers: Cultivators	410	143	267
Marginal workers: Agricultural labourers	23	6	17
Marginal workers: Household industry workers	1	0	1
Marginal workers: Others	27	23	4
Non-workers	451	207	244
