= Panamic =

Panamic Panamik
- Village and Tehsil
- Location within Ladakh Location within India
- Coordinates: 34.786791°N 77.532065°E
- Country: India
- Union Territory: Ladakh
- District: Nubra
- Tehsil: Panamik
- Elevation: 3,183 m (10,443 ft)

Population (2011)
  - Total: 1,478
- Time zone: UTC+5:30 (IST)
- 2011 census code: 918

Panamic or Panamik is a town, and the headquarters of the eponymous tehsil and community development block in the Nubra district of Ladakh in India. It is located in the Nubra Valley.

== Etymology ==
Panamik is a contraction of "སྤང་ན་ཆུ་མིག་" (literally Spang na Chumik), meaning the spring in the meadows.

== Demographics ==
According to the 2011 census of India, Panamic has 186 households. The effective literacy rate (i.e. the literacy rate of population excluding children aged 6 and below) is 80.44%.

Demographics (2011 Census)
	Total	Male	Female
Population	1478	1083	395
Children aged below 6 years	72	43	29
Scheduled caste	0	0	0
Scheduled tribe	717	322	395
Literates	1131	944	187
Workers (all)	1155	949	206
Main workers (total)	1089	898	191
Main workers: Cultivators	242	78	164
Main workers: Agricultural labourers	1	0	1
Main workers: Household industry workers	0	0	0
Main workers: Other	846	820	26
Marginal workers (total)	66	51	15
Marginal workers: Cultivators	20	6	14
Marginal workers: Agricultural labourers	0	0	0
Marginal workers: Household industry workers	0	0	0
Marginal workers: Others	46	45	1
Non-workers	323	134	189

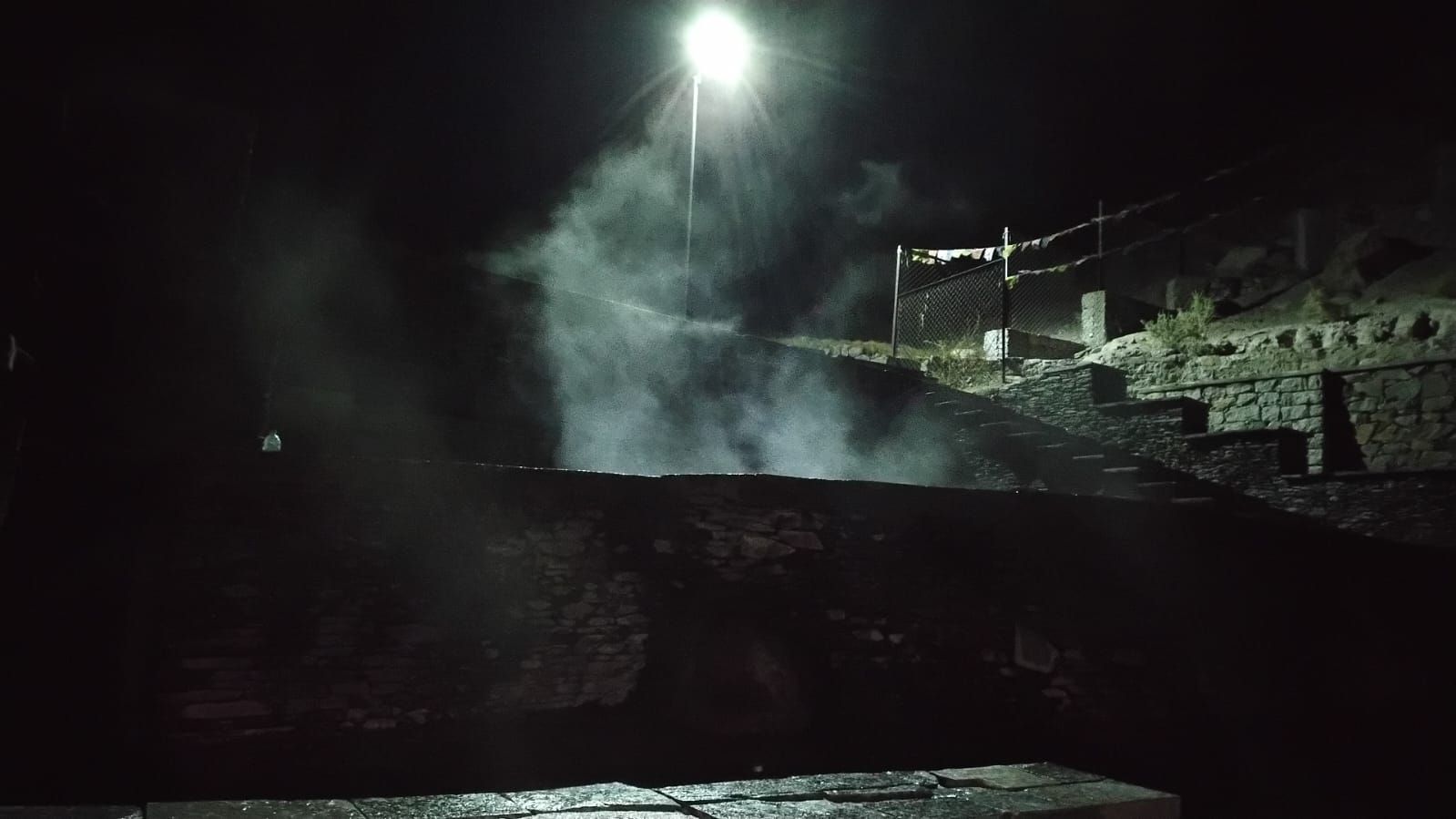
Steaming hot water of the Panamic Hot Springs on a Summer Night.

== Tourism ==
Panamic Hot sulphur springs is used for bathing, drinking water, and therapeutic reasons. Panamik still possesses its charm and potential to accommodate travelers. The beauty and welcoming atmosphere of the area are enhanced by the presence of surrounding attractions like Iantsa Gonpa and Murgi waterfall.

== See also ==
- Geography of Ladakh
- Tourism in Ladakh
