= Khalsar, India =

Khalsar
- Village and Tehsil
- Location in Ladakh, India Khalsar (India)
- Coordinates: 34.4905795°N 77.7029976°E
- Country: India
- Union Territory: Ladakh
- District: Nubra
- Tehsil: Khalsar
- Elevation: 3,264 m (10,709 ft)

Population (2011)
  - Total: 98
- Time zone: UTC+5:30 (IST)
- 2011 census code: 934

Khalsar is a village and one of the tehsil in the Nubra district of Ladakh, India.

== Demographics ==
According to the 2011 census of India, Khalsar has 22 households. The effective literacy rate (i.e. the literacy rate of population excluding children aged 6 and below) is 44.71%.

Demographics (2011 Census)
	Total	Male	Female
Population	98	37	61
Children aged below 6 years	13	1	12
Scheduled caste	0	0	0
Scheduled tribe	98	37	61
Literates	38	19	19
Workers (all)	74	35	39
Main workers (total)	67	29	38
Main workers: Cultivators	41	10	31
Main workers: Agricultural labourers	0	0	0
Main workers: Household industry workers	0	0	0
Main workers: Other	26	19	7
Marginal workers (total)	7	6	1
Marginal workers: Cultivators	4	3	1
Marginal workers: Agricultural labourers	0	0	0
Marginal workers: Household industry workers	0	0	0
Marginal workers: Others	3	3	0
Non-workers	24	2	22
