= Diskit =

- Town
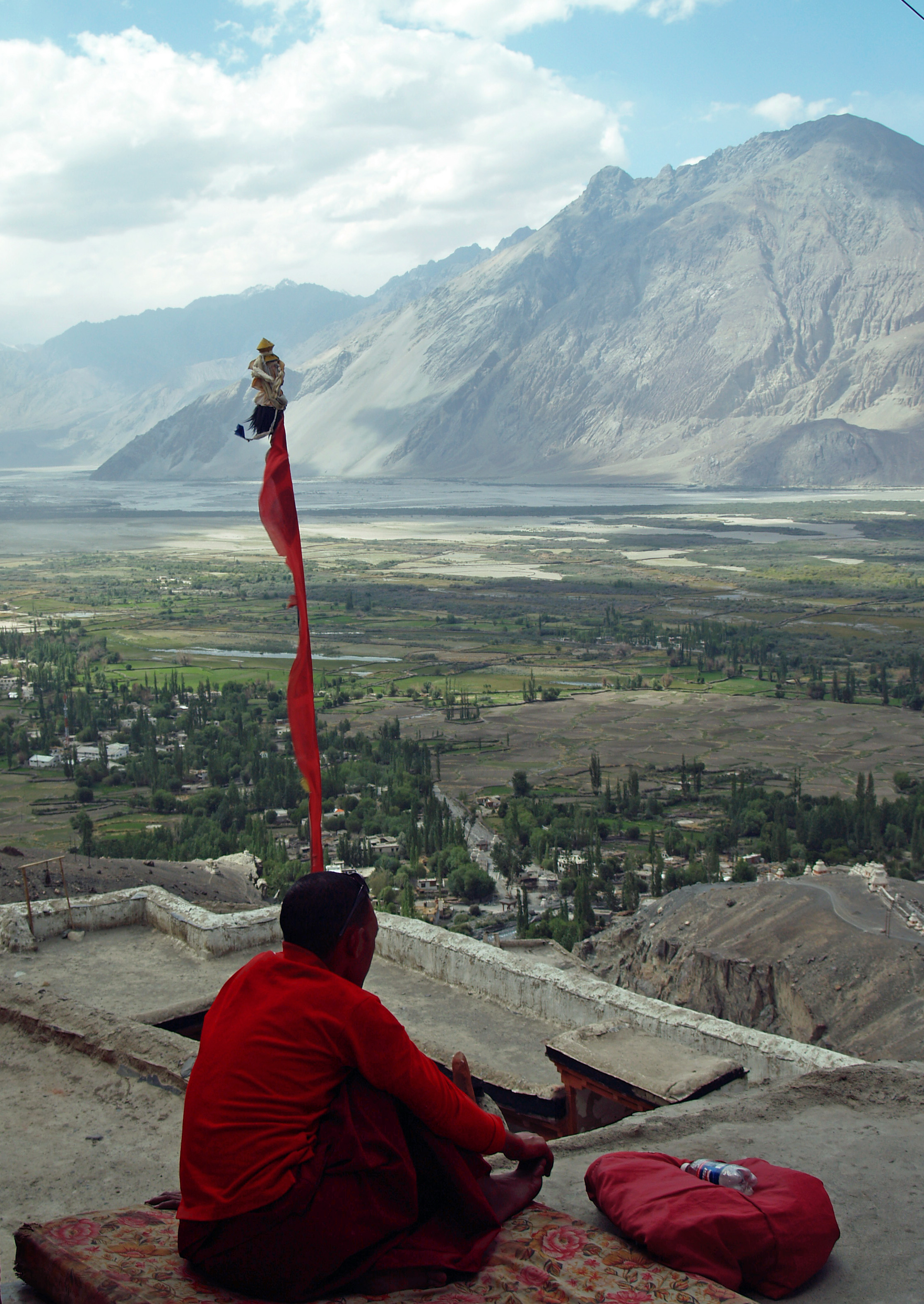
- A monk meditates on the terrace of Diskit Monastery, with the Nubra Valley and the Diskit town seen in the background

- Location in Ladakh, India Diskit (India)
- Coordinates: 34.551210°N 77.548478°E
- Country: India
- Union Territory: Ladakh
- District: Nubra
- Tehsil: Diskit

Government
  - Type: Autonomous Hill Development Council
  - Body: LAHDC, Nubra

Population (2011)
  - Total: 1,760
- Time zone: UTC+5:30 (IST)
- Census code: 929

Diskit is a town in Nubra Valley, and headquarters of the Nubra district as well as the Diskit tehsil, a subdivision and community development block in Ladakh in India. The Diskit Monastery is located in this village.

== Demographics ==
According to the 2011 census of India, Diskit had 344 households. The effective literacy rate (i.e. the literacy rate of population excluding children aged 6 and below) is 76.57%.

Demographics (2011 Census)
	Total	Male	Female
Population	1760	924	836
Children aged below 6 years	185	102	83
Scheduled caste	3	3	0
Scheduled tribe	1519	737	782
Literates	1206	707	499
Workers (all)	927	534	393
Main workers (total)	889	509	380
Main workers: Cultivators	378	129	249
Main workers: Agricultural labourers	2	0	2
Main workers: Household industry workers	0	0	0
Main workers: Other	509	380	129
Marginal workers (total)	38	25	13
Marginal workers: Cultivators	16	8	8
Marginal workers: Agricultural labourers	1	0	1
Marginal workers: Household industry workers	0	0	0
Marginal workers: Others	21	17	4
Non-workers	833	390	443

== Infrastructure ==
- Education
  - Kendriya Vidalaya, Nubra
  - Lamdon Model Senior Secondary School
  - Govt. Degree College Nubra
- Health
  - Diskit Sub Division Hospital
- Other
  - J&K Bank, Nubra
  - PWD Office Nubra
  - Mobile and Internet Connectivity: Diskit also connected with 4G internet Jio and BSNL provide data and voice connectivity.

== Tourism ==
Diskit is one of the major towns in the Nubra region of Ladakh. It is a popular destination for tourists and is situated around 118 km from Leh and 7 km from the town of Hunder. Situated on the banks of the Shyok River, Diskit has many homestay and guest house options that are open throughout the year. The main market is a small place with a few tiny restaurants.

== See also ==
- List of districts of Ladakh
- Geography of Ladakh
- Tourism in Ladakh
