= Stay Alive: Berlin, 1939–1945 =

2026 non-fiction book by Ian Buruma

- Author: Ian Buruma
- Language: English
- Subject: Berlin during World War II
- Genre: History
- Publisher: Penguin Press
- Publication date: 2026
- Publication place: United States
- Media type: Print

Stay Alive: Berlin, 1939–1945 is a 2026 history book by the writer Ian Buruma. It reconstructs everyday life in Berlin under Nazi rule during the Second World War, drawing on diaries, letters and memoirs rather than focusing on military history. Buruma was partly inspired by his father, a Dutch national who was conscripted into forced labour in Berlin during the war. His father's letters home are included in the book. The book was longlisted for the 2026 Baillie Gifford Prize for non-fiction.

== Summary ==
The book covers the years from the outbreak of war with Poland in 1939 through the occupation of Berlin at the end of the war and the subsequent presence of Soviet, American, British and French forces. Rather than dividing Berliners into distinct categories of collaborators and resisters, Buruma argues that most residents were, in his words, "neither cynics, nor bullies, nor ideological fanatics", but people who adapted or looked away in order to survive. The book gives particular attention to the experience of Berlin's Jewish population under Nazi rule and ends with the establishment of the United Nations after the war.

== Reception ==
Reviewing the book for The New York Times Book Review, Kevin Peraino called it a crisply told and uncomfortably relevant history, and connected its account of ordinary compromises under authoritarian rule to the present day. John Powers, in a review for NPR, wrote that the book demonstrates how corrosive it is to live within a "dirty system" and how easily people simply go along with one. The New Yorker named it one of its best books of 2026 so far.
