= Occidentalism =

Imitation or depiction of Western culture

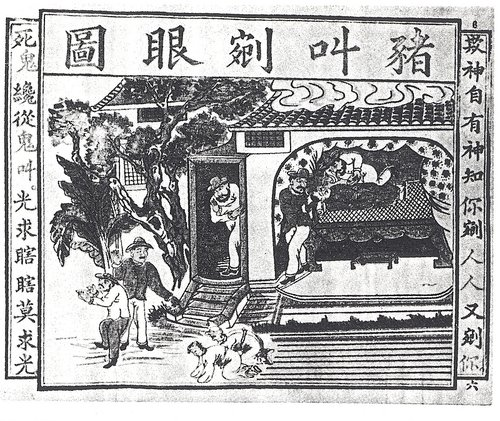
Anti-Western pamphlet printed in China during the Boxer Rebellion, accusing Jesuit missionaries (derogatorily referred to as pigs) of gouging out the eyes of local people, likely an exaggerated caricature of Western medicinal procedures, which stood in opposition to traditional Chinese medicine.

Occidentalism refers to a discipline that discusses the Western world (the Occident) from outside perspectives. Occidentalism focuses on Western culture or customs, especially covering the fields of thought, philosophy, sociology, anthropology, history, religion, colonialism, war, apartheid, and geography. It is not as popular as Orientalism in the general public and in academic settings.

The term emerged as the reverse of Orientalism, defined by literary critic Edward Said, which refers to Western stereotypes of the Eastern world, the Orient.

== Terminologies ==
Different languages have different terms relating to Occidentalism and Westernization.

=== In Arabic ===
In Arabic, al-Istighraab (Arabic: الاستغراب, lit. 'Westernization') is a contemporary psychological, social, and cultural phenomenon. The individuals who embody it are characterized by their inclination toward, attachment to, and emulation of the West. It originated in non-Western societies as a result of the civilizational shock that befell it before and during colonialism.

Ilm al-istighraab (Arabic: علم الاستغراب) means the 'science of Westernization' or 'Occidentalism'. It is opposite to the science of Orientalism. Dr. Hassan Hanafi said: "Occidentalism is the unraveling of the double historical knot between the self and the other... It is the elimination of the complex of greatness of the Western other, by transforming it from a subject in itself to a studied object... The task of Occidentalism is to eliminate Eurocentrism and show how European consciousness has taken center stage throughout modern history, within its own civilizational environment."

Al-Taghreeb (Arabic: التغريب) means 'Westernization'. It is "a cultural and political action carried out by officials in the West, most importantly Orientalists and Westernizers, aiming to obscure the features of the religious and cultural life of Islamic and other societies, and to force these societies to imitate the West and revolve in its orbit."

=== In Urdu ===
Najeeba Arif has used the term gharb shanasi (Urdu: غرب شناسی) to describe the concept of Occidentalism in her work Janoob Asiai Musalmaanon Ki Gharb Shanasi (Urdu: جنوب ایشیائی مسلمانوں کی غرب شناسی; transl. "The Occidentalism of South Asian Muslims"), which cites published and unpublished travel accounts written in Urdu and Persian.

== Origins ==
In China, "Traditions Regarding Western Countries" became a regular part of the Twenty-Four Histories from the 5th century AD, when commentary about The West concentrated upon on an area that did not extend farther than Syria. The extension of European imperialism in the 18th and 19th centuries established, represented, and defined the existence of an "Eastern world" and of a "Western world". Western stereotypes appear in works of Indian, Chinese and Japanese art of those times. At the same time, Western influence in politics, culture, economics and science came to be constructed through an imaginative geography of West and East.

== Characteristics ==
=== Western influence ===
In Occidentalism: The West in the Eyes of its Enemies (2004), Ian Buruma and Avishai Margalit argue that nationalist and nativist resistance to the West replicates Eastern-world responses against the socio-economic forces of modernization, which originated in Western culture, among utopian radicals and conservative nationalists who viewed liberalism and secularism as forces destructive of their societies and cultures. While the early responses to the West were a genuine encounter between alien cultures, many of the later manifestations of Occidentalism betray the influence of Western ideas upon Eastern intellectuals, such as the supremacy of the nation-state, the Romantic rejection of rationality, and the spiritual impoverishment of the citizens living in liberal democracies.

Buruma and Margalit trace that resistance to German Romanticism and to the debates, between the Westernisers and the Slavophiles in 19th-century Russia, and show that like arguments appear in the ideologies of Maoism (which building upon its Sinocentric base, stereotypes the West as being inherently capitalist) and Imperial era Japanese nationalism. Nonetheless, Alastair Bonnett rejects the analyses of Buruma and Margalit as Eurocentric, and said that the field of Occidentalism emerged from the interconnection of Eastern and Western intellectual traditions.

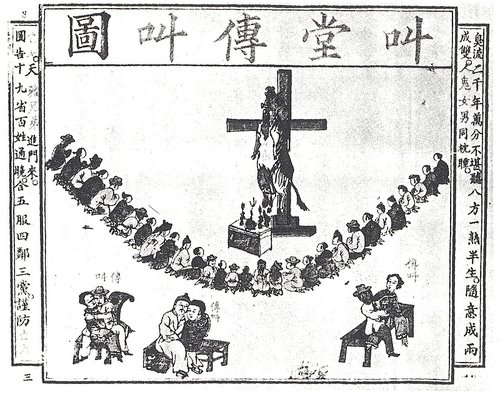
Anti-Western Chinese pamphlet issued during the Boxer Rebellion caricaturising Christianity and showing Jesuit missionaries having sex with local Chinese women.

=== Prevalent tropes ===
The most prevalent Occidentalist tropes involve the West being decadent, imperialist, interventionist, exploitative and hypersexual. In the words of Ian Leslie, Occidentalism caricatures Westerners as a mass of "soulless, decadent, money-grabbing, ruthless, faithless, unfeeling parasites".

=== In South Asia ===
Occidentalism in India was developed in late 19th century as a part of cultural nationalism by Indian nationalists and Hindu revivalist groups in reaction to the then prevalent attitudes of slavish imitation of the West and self-hating inferiority complex among the educated urban middle class (see Bhadralok) exposed to the Eurocentric civilising mission narrative propagated by the British colonial government, especially in the context of swadeshi. It characterised the West as deeply materialistic opposed to the spiritual East. This has been appropriated by Hindu nationalism to portray the West (in additional to being materialistic), as being inherently Christian in nature (despite the number of Christians in the West being in decline), thereby branding Western values as extensions of Judeo-Christian ethics meant to spread Christianity in guise of Enlightenment, thereby being fundamentally incompatible with the Hindu way of life. Under this rationale, anti-Western sentiment is promoted in the name of decolonialism.

In her book Janoob Asiai Musalmaanon Ki Gharb Shanasi (Urdu: جنوب ایشیائی مسلمانوں کی غرب شناسی; transl. "The Occidentalism of South Asian Muslims"), Najeeba Arif examines the motives behind South Asian travellers' journeys to the West and the impact they had on their understanding of it. Arif—who mentions in the introduction to her book that it is an attempt to ascertain whether Eastern intellectuals have tried to study the West in the manner of Westerners who have recorded their opinions of the East in their travelogues, letters, and other writings—has been extolled by Rauf Parekh as being fully qualified to "claim the distinction" of being "the first researcher to have carried out such a study in Urdu." Discussing the reasons for limiting her study to South Asian Muslims, she states her intention to perform a critical evaluation of the perception that Muslims oppose modern ideas and education, a narrative which she argues has been pushed by Bernard Lewis and by Samuel Huntington's theory of the clash of civilizations, although already refuted by Edward Said in Covering the Islam. She negates the common assumption that the East has a negative opinion of the West (held by previous works on Occidentalism in the West) and posits, relying on rare, unpublished accounts and travelogues, that South Asian writers have demonstrated sufficient appreciation for the West and its culture.

=== In Islamism ===
A similar vein of thought is found in the writings of the Islamist ideologue Sayyid Qutb, who interpreted Western values, (especially sexual freedom) and as hedonistic and fundamentally immoral, comparing it with jahilliyah. In addition to the label of being morally depraved, Islamist discourse also stereotypes the West as being inherently Christian in nature, pro-Zionist and Islamophobic. Under this rationale, justify their terrorist activities in the name of jihad, often invoking the Crusade-era struggle of Muslims.

=== In Eastern Europe ===
Occidentalism in Eastern Europe rose up in reaction to the application of Orientalist narratives towards them by the West, but unlike the Slavophilic or pan-Slavic movements of the past which emphasised the role of the Eastern Orthodox Church in national identity formation as a criticism to the Western theory of Byzantinism, Eastern European occidentalism arose as backlash against immigration of Muslim refugees into EU and perceived coercion for legalising homosexuality. Putinist groups in Eastern Europe label the West as being obsessed with homosexuality and having abandoned traditional Christian values for atheistic multiculturalism. Occidentalist tropes are utilised by far-right groups in Eastern Europe to legitimize homophobia and democratic backsliding.

== Occidentalism figures ==
- Hassan Hanafi (Cairo)
- Mukti Ali (Indonesia)
- Adian Husaini (Indonesia)
- Yan Min (China)
- Najeeba Arif (Pakistan)
- Avishai Margalit
- Ian Buruma

== See also ==
- Anti-Western sentiment
- Anti-modernization – Sociological term
- Colonialism
- Decolonization
- Global arrogance
- Atlanticism
- Indigenism
- Islamism
- Orient
- Orientalism
- The War Against the West
- Clash of Civilizations
- Westoxification
