= Hassanabad, Chorbat =

Village in Baltistan

Hassanabad حسن آباد
- Village
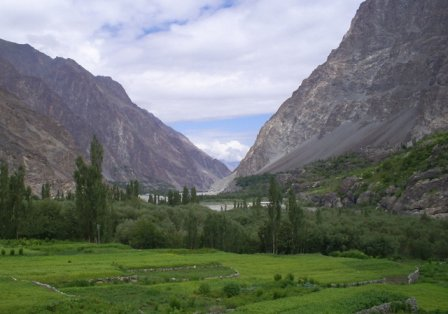
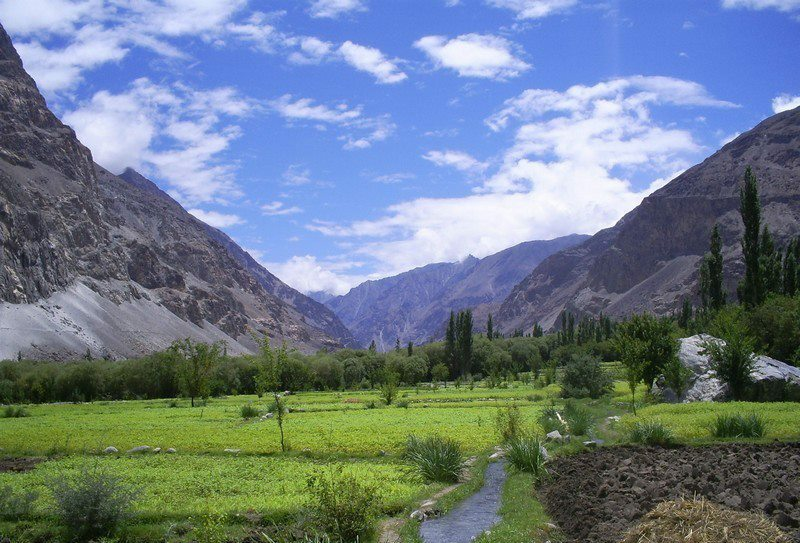
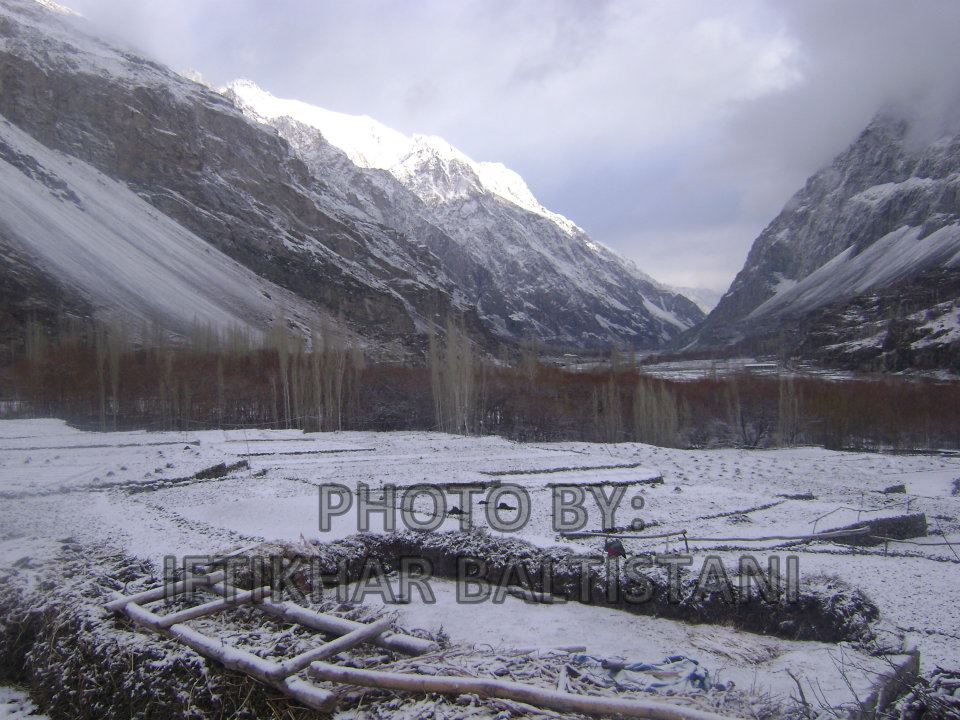
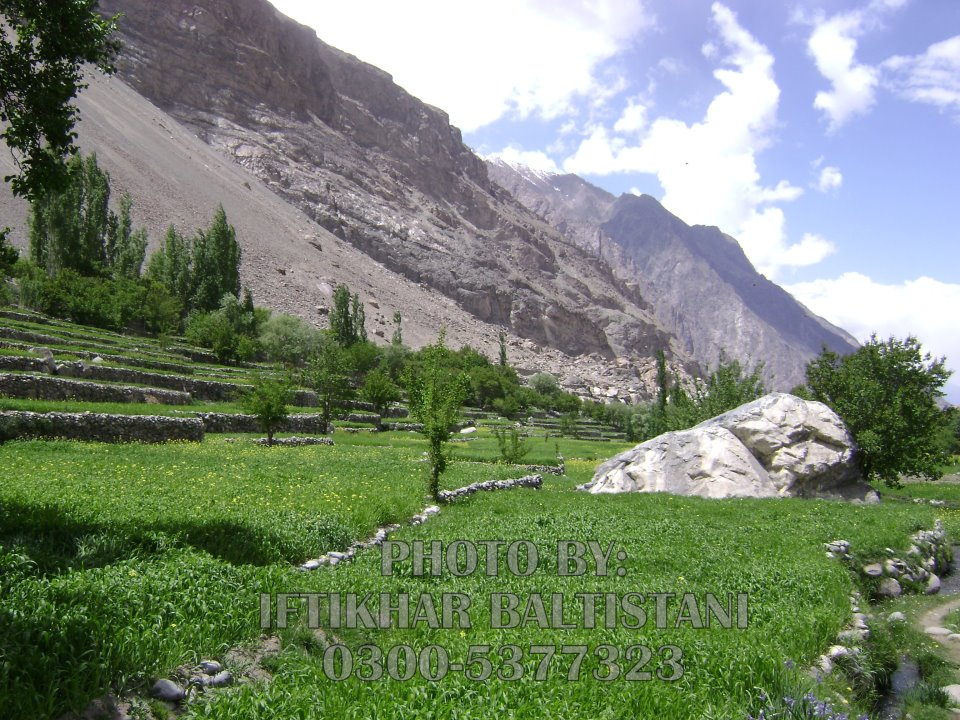
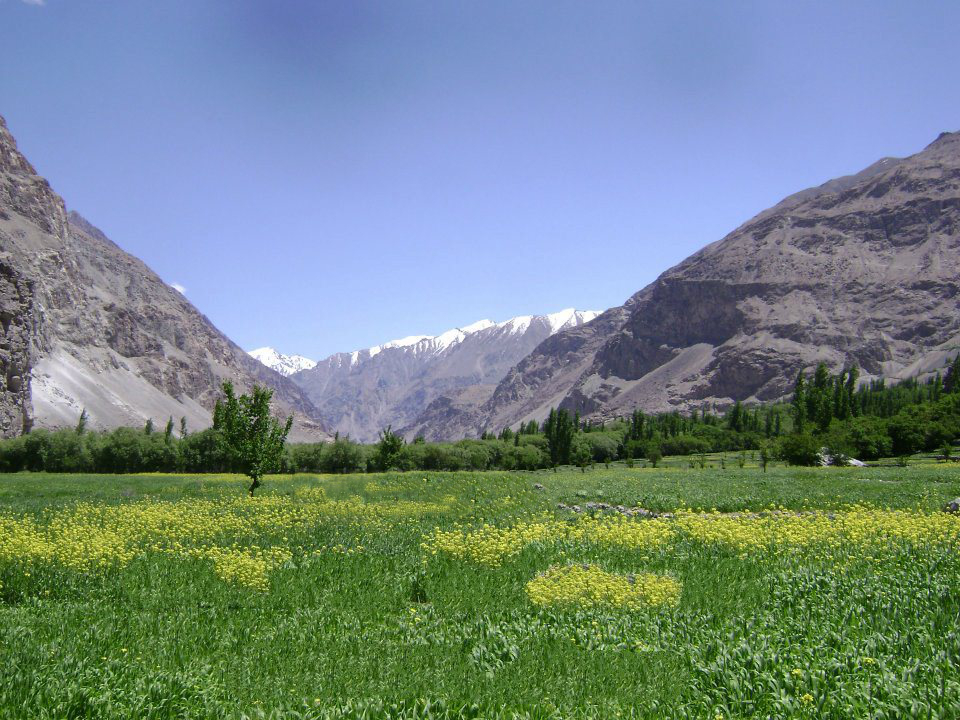
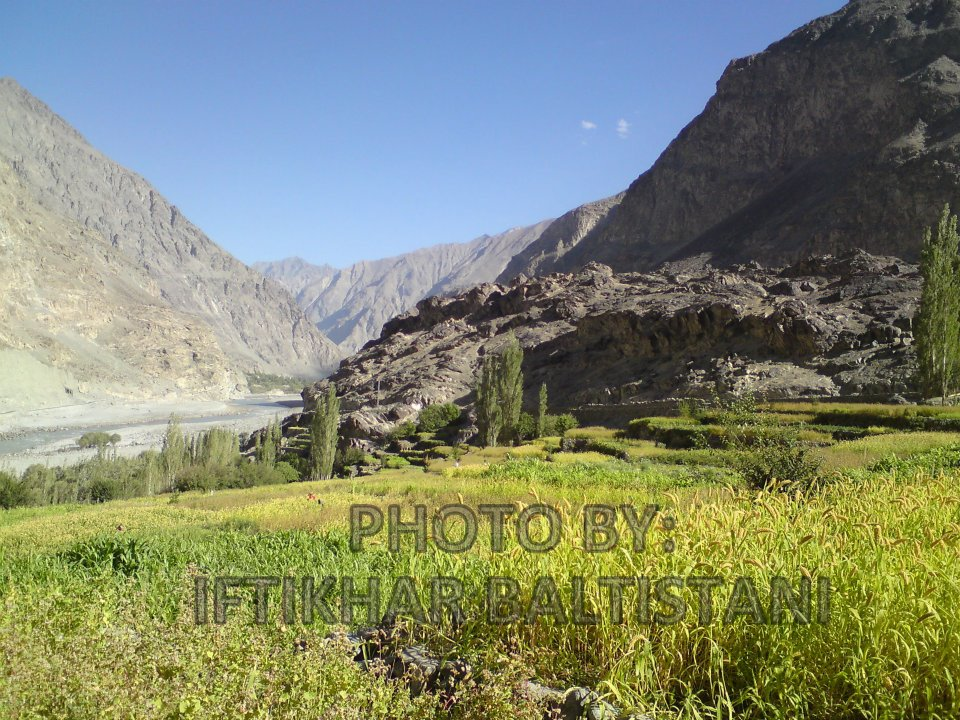
- Hassanabad in Ghanche District
- Interactive map of Hassanabad
- Hassanabad on Gilgit-Baltistan Map Hassanabad (Pakistan)
- Coordinates: 34°58′24″N 76°32′25″E
- Country: Pakistan
- District: Gilgit-Baltistan
- District: Ghanche District
- Tehsil: Chorbat Tehsil
- Union council: Siksa
- Elevation: 2,670 m (8,760 ft)
- Time zone: UTC+5 (PST)
  - Summer (DST): GMT+5

Hassanabad (Urdu: حسن آباد) is a village in Chorbat, Ghanche District of Gilgit-Baltistan, Pakistan. It lies 141 kilometres (88 mi) east of Skardu, close to the Line of Control. It consists of 7 blocks, namely Painkhor, Gabkhor, Thangkhor, Hajipakhor, Goostrang, Komick and Oraitan.

Villages near Hassanabad includes Marcha, Dawoo, Piun, Partuk, Siksa and Frano.

== Etymology ==
The ancient name of Hassanabad was Kusting, which means a large storage of water. It is said that in ancient times the Buddhist lama who ruled the area name was Lama Kastiyang. and the name Kusting was derived from the lama's name. In the past it was the trade route to Ladakh and Kargil.

== Geography ==
Hassanabad has an average elevation of about 2,670 metres (8,760 ft), and is situated along the banks of the Shyok River, a tributary of the Indus. The Shyok River near the village is an important resources for irrigation. However, the same river sometime creates havoc during summer with unpredictable floods.

The mountains and their surroundings generally have no forests, however there are some shrubs and herbs which are generally used by the local communities as medicinal herbs and for their cattle.

== Demographics ==
The language spoken is Balti. The entire population is Sofia Noorbakhshia Muslim. The village has 270 households and seven Mohallas.

== Climate ==
The climate of Hassanabad during the summer is moderated by its mountain setting and the intense heat of lowland Pakistan does not reach here. The mountains also block out the summer monsoon and summer rainfall is thus quite low. However, these mountains result in very severe winter weather. During the April to October temperatures vary between a maximum of 27 °C and a minimum (in October) 8 °C. However, temperatures can drop to below -26 °C in the December-to-February midwinter period.

== Transport ==
Hassanabad is accessible only by road. The normal route to Hassanabad is via Shyok Valley Road, which connects it to Skardu and to the district headquarters, Khaplu. The climate can have adverse effects on transport in and out of the Hassanabad, as the roads in and out of can be blocked for weeks.

== Gallery ==
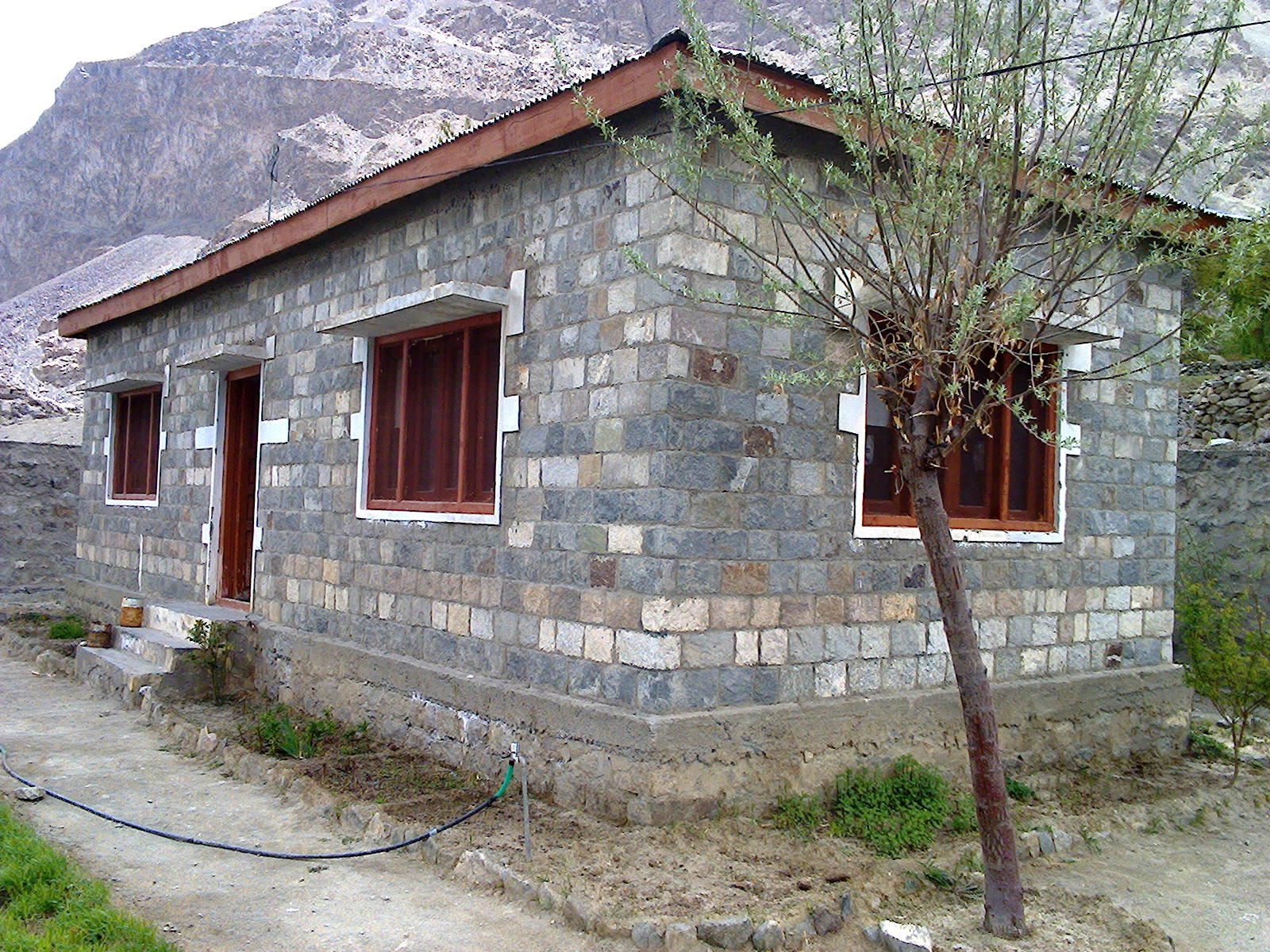
Veterinary Hospital Hassanabad Chorbat

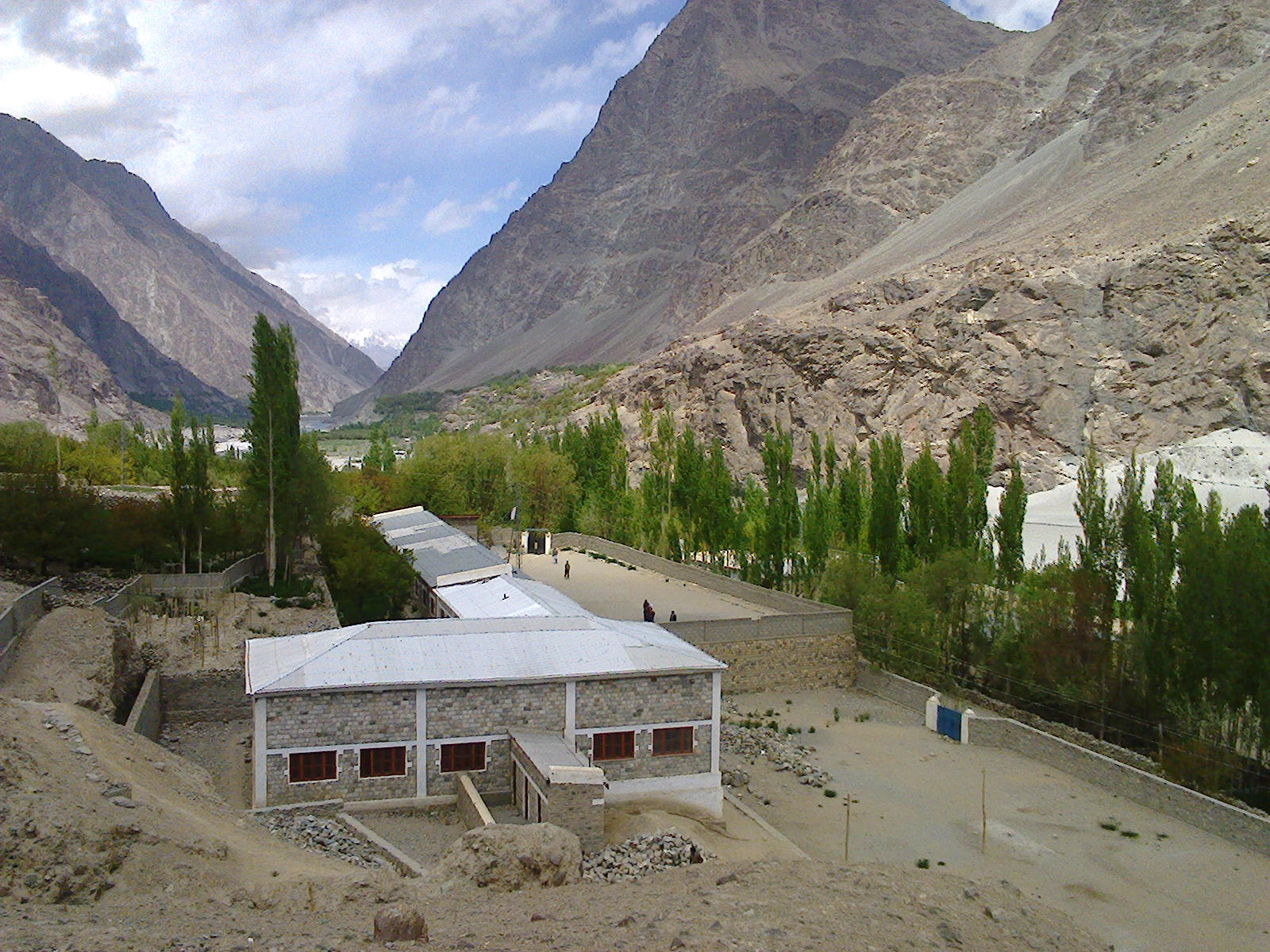
Govt High School Hassanabad

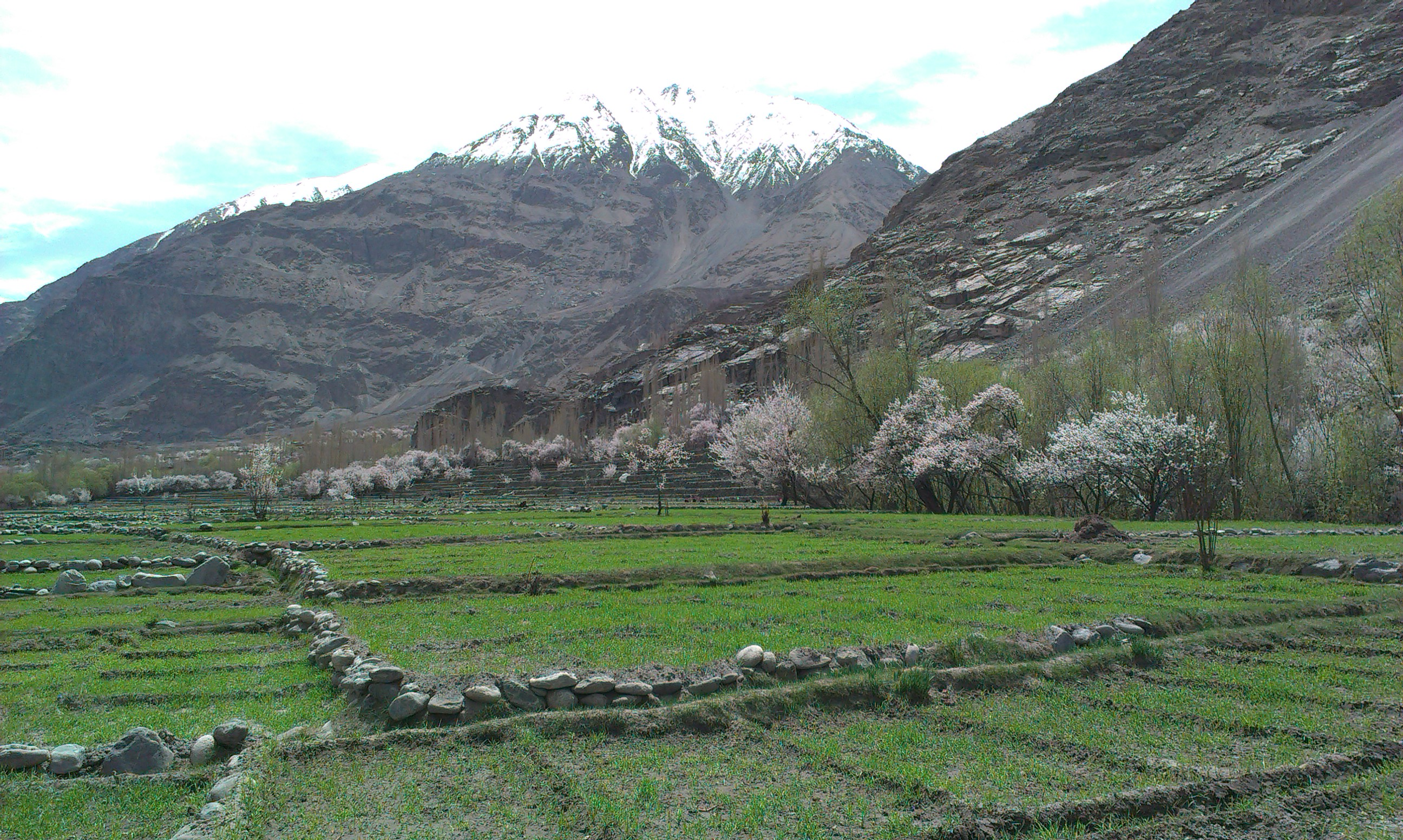
View of a mountain, apricot tree and green fields in Hassanabad Chorbat

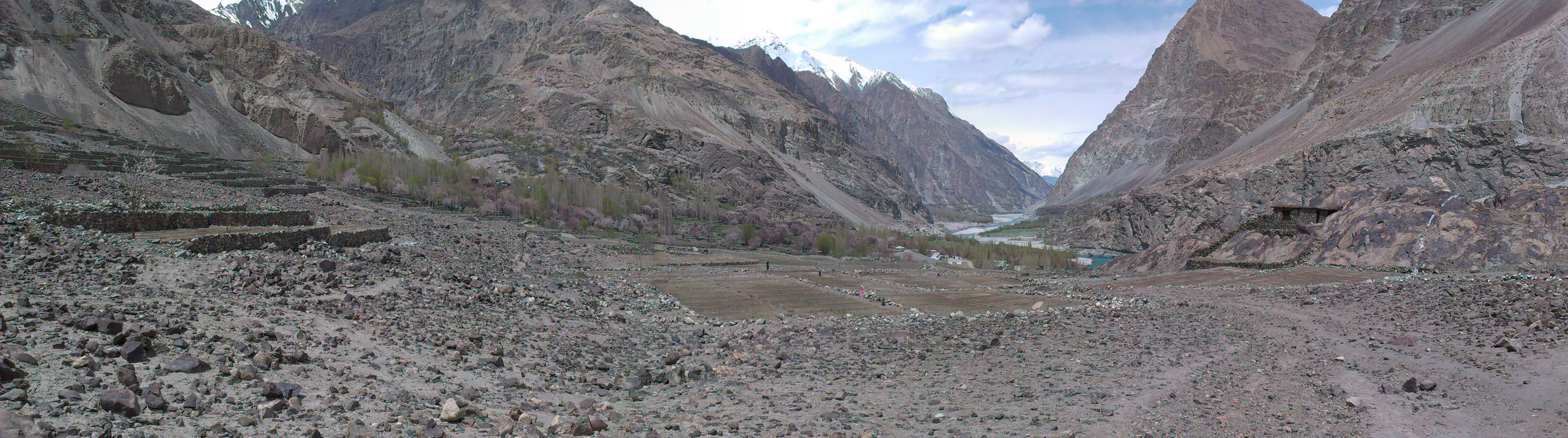
Panoramic_view_of_Hassanabad_Chorbat.jpg
