= Buruma =

Buruma may refer to:

- Buruma, Japanese for bloomers, specifically athletic bloomers
- Bulma (ブルマ, Buruma), a character in the Japanese comic series Dragon Ball, by Akira Toriyama
- Buruma (Baucau), a village in East Timor in the district of Baucau
- Ian Buruma (born 1951), Dutch writer on Japanese culture
