= Edna Ullmann-Margalit =

Israeli academic philosopher and social scientist

- Born: 1946
- Died: 16 October 2010 (aged 63–64)
- Education: University of Oxford

Edna Ullman-Margalit (Hebrew: עדנה אולמן-מרגלית; born 1946 - died 16 October 2010) was an Israeli academic philosopher and social scientist who worked for many years at the Hebrew University of Jerusalem. According to Cass Sunstein and Avishai Margalit, who edited a posthomous collection of her articles, Ullmann-Margalit "was an unorthodox and deeply original philosopher" and her work is important "not only for philosophy, but also for political science, psychology, sociology, cognitive science, economics (including behavioural economics), law, and even public policy." A new book, co-written by Ullmann-Margalit and Cass Sunstein, entitled Decisions and Social Norms is being published in 2026. In the Fall of 1997, Ullman-Margalit was a Fellow at the Swedish Collegium for Advanced Study in Uppsala, Sweden.

== The Emergence of Norms ==
In her 1977 book The Emergence of Norms, Ullmann-Margalit argues that some of the problems caused by some social interactions can be solved by norms. These problems can be thought of as inhering in the game-theoretical structure of some particular social situations. She delimits various types of situations as paradigms to be dealt with. 1) Prisoners' Dilemma-type situations 2) Co-ordination type situations; and 3) Inequality (or partiality) type situations. In each of these some basic difficulties confront the individuals involved. Different types of norms of social behaviour are then proposed as solutions to each of these situations.

== On Presumption ==
In her 1983 article 'On Presumption', Ullmann-Margalit presents a philosophical account of the notion of a presumption which, in her view, had "not so far been the focus of proper philosophical attention". Ullmann-Margalit begins by examining how presumptions operate in the law, and then draws lessons for uses of presumptions in other contexts. She explicates presumptions in terms of a "presumption formula" - "P raises the presumption that Q' where P is the "presumption-raising fact" and Q is the "presumed fact"; she expresses this as "pres (P,Q)" and then analyses it using a "presumption rule": "Given that p is the case, you (= the rule subject) shall proceed as if q were true, unless or until you have (sufficient) reason to believe that q is not the case."

Daniel Mendonca has described Ullmann-Margalit's article as "stimulating" and has proposed some refinements to it.

== Selected publications ==
- Ullmann-Margalit E, The Emergence of Norms (Oxford: OUP 1977).
- Ullmann-Margalit E, 'Invisible-hand explanations' (1978) 39 Synthese 263.
- Sunstein, C. R., & Ullmann-Margalit E, 'Second-order decisions' (1999) 110 Ethics 5.
- Ullmann-Margalit E, 'On Presumption' (1983) 80 The Journal of Philosophy 143.
- Ullmann-Margalit E, 'Out of the Cave: A Philosophical Inquiry into the Dead Sea Scrolls Research' (Harvard University Press 2006).
- Ullmann-Margalit E, Sunstein, C. R. & Margalit A (eds), Normal Rationality: Decisions and Social Order (Oxford: OUP 2017).

== Other sources ==
- Avishai Margalit - "Edna Ullmann-Margalit Contribution to the Study of Rationality", Center for the Study of Rationality youtube video
- History and Rationality Lecture Series - Edna Ullman-Margalit Hebrew University of Jerusalem (in Hebrew)
