= Murder in Amsterdam =

2006 book by Ian Buruma

Murder in Amsterdam: The Death of Theo Van Gogh and the Limits of Tolerance
- First edition
- Author: Ian Buruma
- Language: English
- Subject: Theo van Gogh
- Publisher: Penguin Press HC
- Publication date: September 7, 2006
- Publication place: United States
- Media type: Print (Hardcover, Paperback), E-book
- Pages: 288
- ISBN: 978-1594201080
- OCLC: 969657698

Murder in Amsterdam: The Death of Theo Van Gogh and the Limits of Tolerance is a 2006 book by Ian Buruma. The Guardian describes it as, "part reportage, part essay." It explores the impact of mass immigration from Muslim countries on Dutch culture through the lens of the murder of film director and anti-immigration activist, Theo van Gogh.

Murder in Amsterdam won the 2006 Los Angeles Times Book Prize.

== Argument ==
Buruma argues that conservatives have "commandeered" the liberal values of the European Enlightenment to portray Islam and Western culture as "competing, hostile versions of absolute truth."

Buruma argues that murderers like the young Muslim who killed Theo van Gogh are driven to action by the failure of Dutch society to recognize them as full members of Dutch society, their new homeland.

He concluded with a vague hope that reason and civility will prevail.

== Reception ==
Christopher Caldwell wrote that Buruma is "less interested in the details of the killing than in what followed: the ideologies vindicated or discredited, the prejudices revealed and the doubts cast on the workability" of what Buruma regarded as Amsterdam's new, almost 50% immigrant society. Buruma cited data showing that Amsterdam 1999, was 45 per cent foreign in 1999, and would be 52% foreign by 2015.

== Ongoing impact ==
The book is regarded as an early exploration of the process of Islamist radicalization and commitment to Jihad. Buruma explores the steps by which in only a few months time, van Gogh's murderer, Mohammed Bouyeri, a young man born in the Netherlands and living a secular life, gave up Western clothing, donned a djellaba and prayer cap, stopped using alcohol and marijuana, grew a beard, stopped dating, cut all ties with old friends, and murdered a man, explaining in court that his Muslim faith required him “to chop off the head of anyone who insults Allah and the prophet.”
