= Bad Elements =

2001 book by Ian Buruma

- First edition
- Author: Ian Buruma
- Language: English
- Genre: Contemporary History
- Publisher: Random House
- Publication date: November 2001
- Publication place: United States
- Media type: Print (hardcover)
- Pages: 400 pp (first edition)
- ISBN: 0-679-45768-2
- OCLC: 367111
- Dewey Decimal: 951.05/7 21
- LC Class: DS779.26 .B864 2001

Bad Elements is a book about contemporary Chinese history by Ian Buruma, published by Random House on November 20, 2001. The book's subtitle, Chinese Rebels from Los Angeles to Beijing, indicates the main focus of the book.

Bad Elements is divided into three parts: The Exiles, Greater China and the Motherland.
