= Moshe Halbertal =

Israeli philosopher, professor, and writer (born 1958)

- משה הלברטל
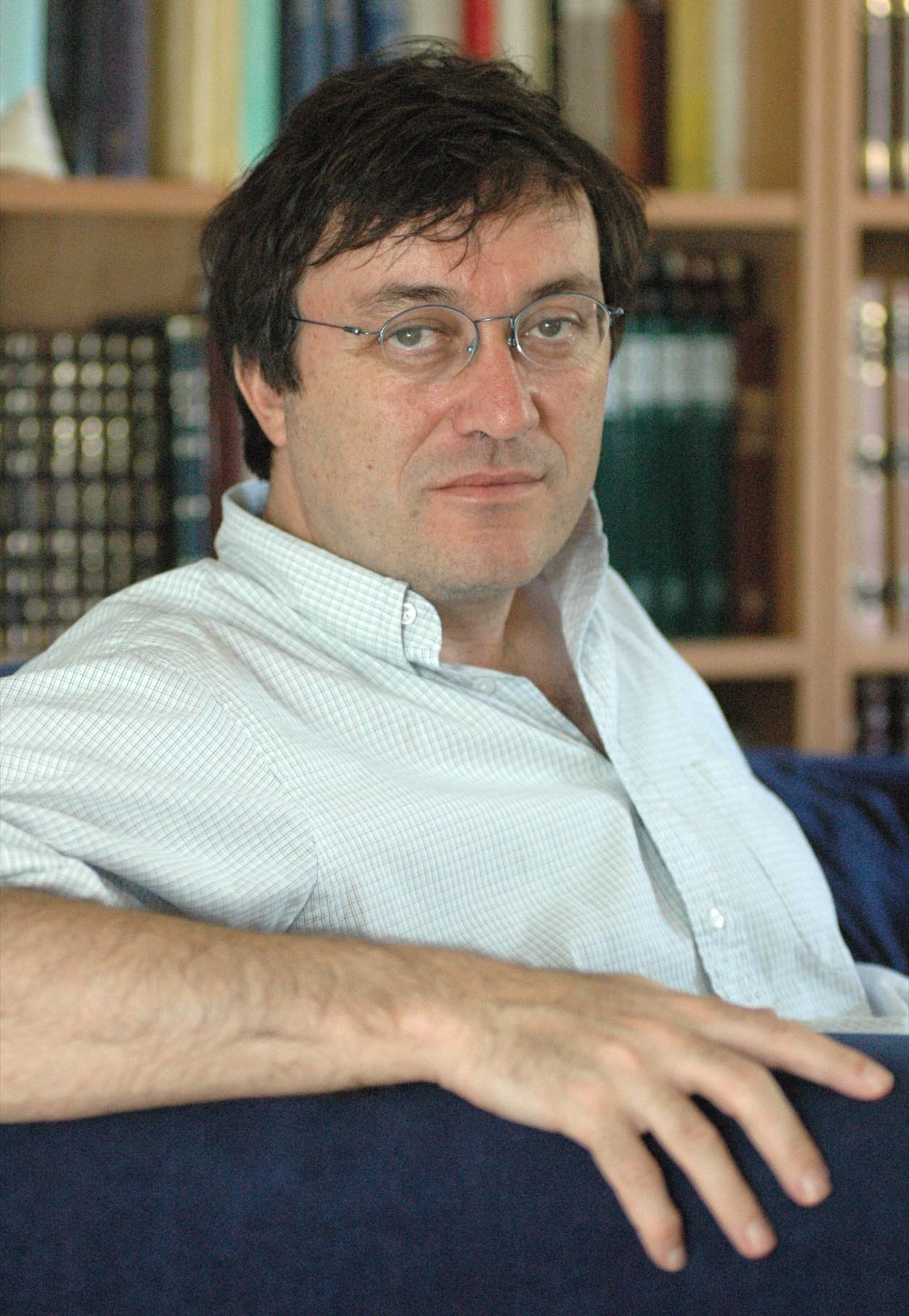
- Moshe Halbertal in 2009.
- Born: 1958 (age 67–68); Uruguay
- Occupations: philosopher, professor, writer

Academic background
- Education: Hebrew University of Jerusalem
- Thesis: "Values as interpretative criteria in Jewish law"
- Doctoral advisor: Menachem Elon Avishai Margalit

Academic work
- Institutions: Hebrew University of Jerusalem Reichman University New York University Israel Academy of Sciences and Humanities
- Website: Moshe Halbertal

Moshe Halbertal (Hebrew: משה הלברטל; born Montevideo, Uruguay, 1958) is an Israeli philosopher, professor, and writer, a noted expert on Maimonides, and co-author of the Israeli Army Code of Ethics. He currently holds positions as the John and Golda Cohen Professor of Jewish Thought and Philosophy at the Hebrew University of Jerusalem and Gruss Professor of Law at NYU School of Law (appointed 2002). In 2021 he was elected to the American Philosophical Society.

== Biography ==
Born in Uruguay, he made aliyah to Israel. Halbertal was reared in Israel in a modern Orthodox family. His father was a Holocaust survivor from Łańcut, Galicia (Central-Eastern Europe), his mother an Israeli who had come to Uruguay to teach Hebrew.

He received his B.A. in Jewish Thought and Philosophy from Hebrew University, cum laude, in 1984, and his PhD from Hebrew University in 1989. He wrote his doctoral dissertation on the topic '"Values as interpretative criteria in Jewish law" under the supervision of Menachem Elon and Avishai Margalit.

From 1988 to 1992, he was a fellow at the Harvard Society of Fellows. Halbertal has been a visiting professor at Yale Law School, Harvard Law School, and the University of Pennsylvania Law School. He is a faculty member at the Mandel School for Educational Leadership in Jerusalem.

He received the Rothschild Foundation's Bruno Award and the Goren Goldstein Award for the "Best Book in Jewish Thought" in the years 1997-2000.

He is a member of the Editorial Board of the Jewish Review of Books.

He was married to Dr. Tova Hartman, and they have three daughters - Naomi, Rachel and Shira.

== Positions ==
=== Orthodoxy ===
According to Halbertal, what "distinguishes between the so-called ultra-Orthodox point of view and a modern Orthodox or modern approach (is) that tradition doesn't monopolize all of value, all of truth".

=== Religion and State ===
Halbertal believes that the Israeli government ought to finance and subsidize religious education, synagogues, and mikvahs, but not impose doctrinal tests on these institutions. In his view, individuals should have an equal opportunity to form Orthodox, Reform, or other kinds of congregations with the same access to state funding.

=== Democracy ===
Halbertal has stated he supports the democratic process. Halbertal once remarked, "democracy is a non-violent form of adjudicating different ideologies. It's very easy to be non-violent when stakes are low; in Israel, we are in a condition where the stakes are very high. It's a tribute to Israel that it has managed to maintain democracy under such conditions of diversity and high political stakes. I would like to see other Western states deal with this condition without becoming fascistic."

== Publications ==
- Idolatry, co-authored with Avishai Margalit, translated by Naomi Goldblum (Harvard University Press, 1992)
- Interpretative Revolutions in the Making (Hebrew) (Magnes Press, 1997)
- People of the Book: Canon, Meaning and Authority (Harvard University Press, 1997)
- Between Torah and Wisdom: Menachem ha-Meiri and the Maimonidean Halakhists in Provence (Hebrew) (Magnes Press, 2000) (Goldstein-Goren award for the best book in Jewish thought in the years 1997-2000)
- Concealment and Revelation: The Secret and its Boundaries in Medieval Jewish Thought (Yeriot, 2001)
- Esotericism in Jewish Thought and its Philosophical Implications (translated from Hebrew by Jackie Feldman as Concealment and Revelation (Princeton University Press, 2007)
- By Way of Truth: Nachmanides and the Creation of Tradition (Hebrew) (Shalom Hartman Institute, 2006)
- Judaism and the Challenges of Modern Life, co-edited with Donniel Hartman (Continuum, 2007)
- Maimonides (Hebrew) (Merkaz Zalman Shazar series, 2009)
- On Sacrifice (Princeton University Press, 2012)
- Maimonides: Life and Thought (Princeton University Press, 2013)
- The Beginning of Politics : Power in the Biblical Book of Samuel (Princeton University Press, 2017)
- The Birth of Doubt: Confronting Uncertainty in Early Rabbinic Literature (Brown Judaic Studies, 2020)
- Nahmanides: Law and Mysticism (Yale University Press, 2020)

== Awards ==
2013: National Jewish Book Award in the Scholarship category for Maimonides: Life and Thought
