= Chorbat Valley =

Section of Shyok River Valley in Kashmir

- Valley
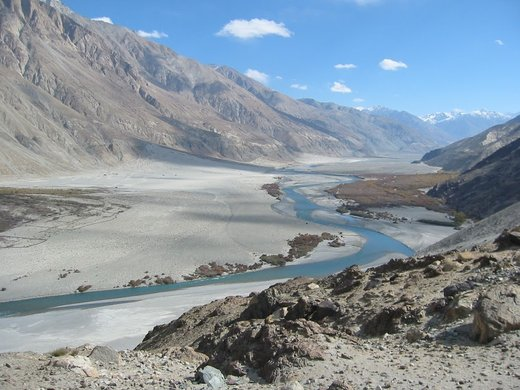

- Jammu & Kashmir
- Coordinates: 34.930°N 76.763°E
- Country: Pakistan & India
- Province/State: Gilgit-Baltistan & Ladakh
- District: Ghanche & Nubra District
- Tehsil: Khaplu & Nubra

Population (2010)
  - Total: 20,000

Chorbat Valley (Urdu: وادی چھوربٹ, Balti: ཆོར་བད, romanized: chor bad) is a section of the Shyok River Valley divided between Pakistan-administered Gilgit-Baltistan and Indian-administered Ladakh. The Pakistan-administered portion is in the Khaplu tehsil of Ghanche district in Gilgit-Baltistan, and the Indian-administered portion is in the Nubra district in Ladakh. Chorbat traditionally stretches from the edge of Khaplu to the Chalunka village of Nubra.

The Khan of Chorbat moved his capital from Siksa (originally named Chorbat) to Turtuk in the 18th century. These two villages (now in Pakistan and India respectively) are the largest villages of the Chorbat region.

== Geography ==
Chorbat

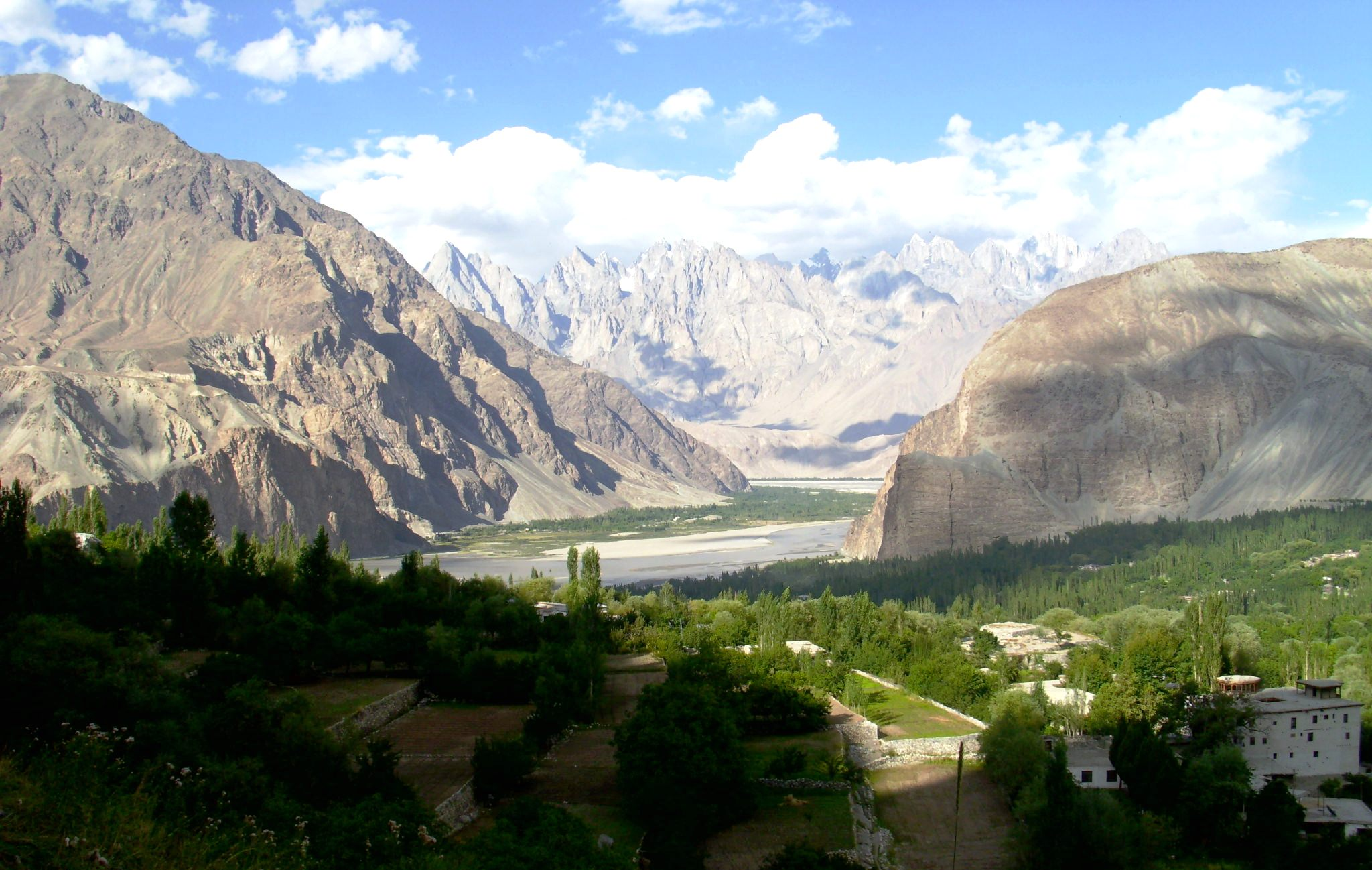
Chorbat Valley near Hassanabad

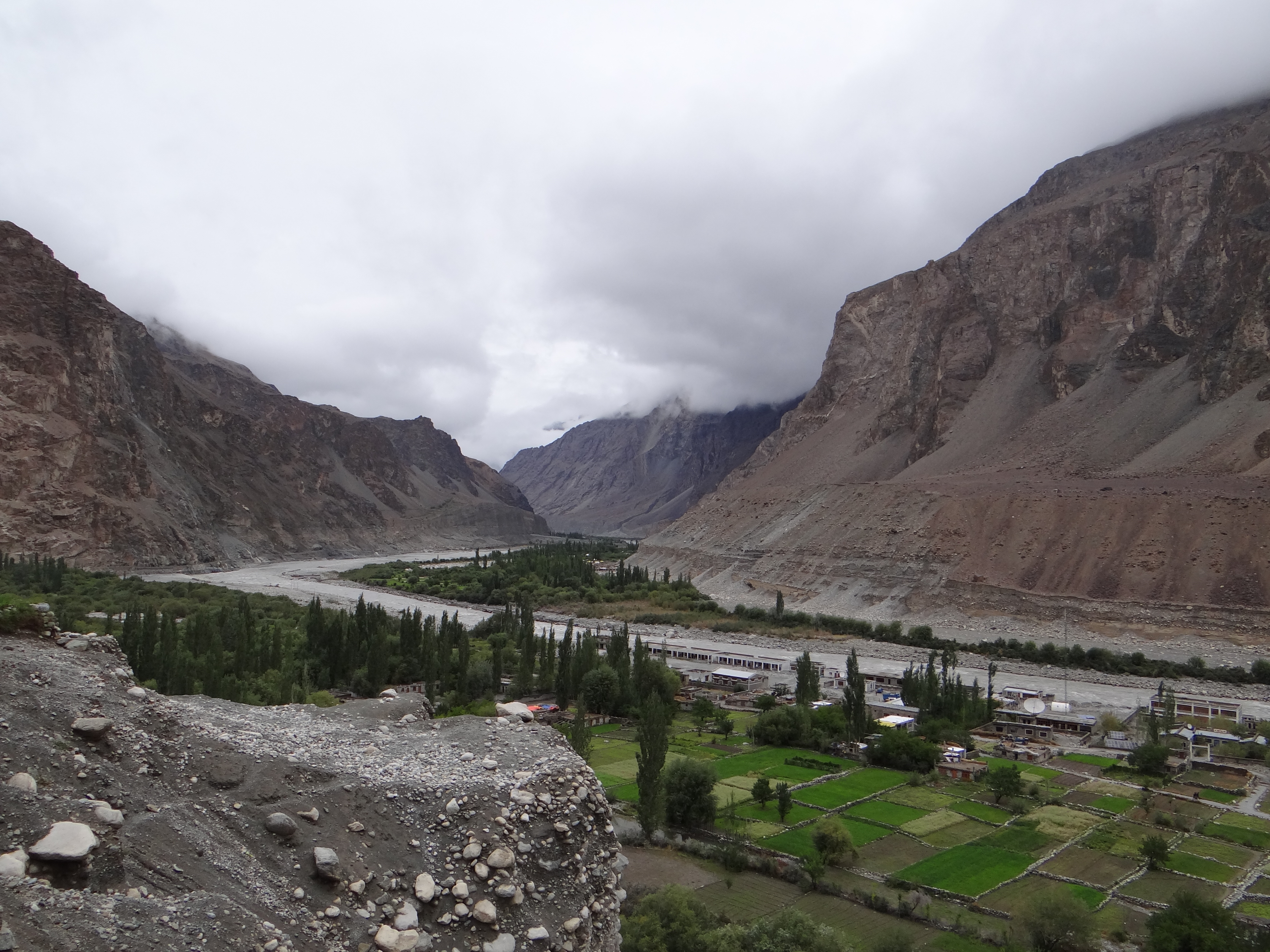
Chorbat Valley near Turtuk

Chorbat is an indistinct region at the border between Baltistan and Ladakh near the course of the Shyok River. It is marked by

- the Chorbat La pass, the traditional border between Baltistan and Ladakh and currently on the Line of Control between Pakistan and India,
- the Chorbat village in Baltistan, now called Siksa, and
- the town of Turtuk, presently in Nubra, which is considered its traditional capital.

In the early decades of the Jammu and Kashmir princely state, there was a Chorbat ilaqa (subdistrict) in the Baltistan wazarat (district). It stretched along the Shyok River Valley from a village called Dou-U (Dawou) in the west to Chalunka in the east.

Between the Chorbat village and the Chorbat La pass lies the Chorbat Lungpa Valley. To the south of the Chorbat La pass, the Hanu Valley carries a stream that flows down to join the Indus River near the village of Dah. The Chorbat Lungpa and Hanu valleys constituted the main route from Baltistan to Ladakh in the past. The villages in the Hanu valley as well as Dah are fortified, indicating that they experienced raids from Baltistan in the past. Being the main travel route between Baltistan and Leh, the route carried part of the Silk Road traffic, which enriched the people of Chorbat.

The valley is surrounded by high rising peaks of the Karakoram mountain range and the bank of the Shyok River. The climate is hard with little rain and extremely cold winters due to proximity to Siachen Glacier and other peaks and glaciers. Geographically, the wide valley of the Shyok River in "Lower Nubra" narrows to a mountain gorge near the Yagulung village (34.77°N 77.14°E). The Shyok flows through the gorge until Khaplu, where the valley widens again. A string of villages dot this gorge, wherever possible along the banks of the river. The main populated areas in Chorbat are in the Shyok River Valley, comprising some 13 villages in present-day Baltistan, and 5 villages in Indian-administered Ladakh. In Pakistan, these villages are Dawou, Marcha, Kuwas, Siksa, Hassanabad, Partuk, Piun, Kalaan, Sukhmos, Chhowar, Thongmus, Siari, and Frano. In India, they are Bogdang, Chalunka, Turtuk, Tyakshi, and Thang. The folklore includes all these villages in Chorbat.

== History ==
According to Rohit Vohra, the original settlers of the area were Brog-pa Dards. Above the present-day Turtuk stand the ruins of a large fortress built by them. Tradition holds that the Brog-pa Dards were Buddhist and lived under a constant danger of attack from the north, until two warriors from the 'west' called Chulli and Yandrung overran them. The Brog-pas are said to have fled and settled in the Hanu valley. The present-day residents of Turtuk are divided into 'Chulli-pa' and 'Yandrung-pa', claiming descent from Chulli and Yandrung. The area is said to have been originally settled by people from Ladakh. At present, the people display a mix of Ladakhi and Balti influences.

Later, in the 16th–17th centuries, Islamic missionaries came to the area. Traditions narrate the visits of 'Amir Kabir' (possibly Mir Sayyid Ali Hamadani) and Sayyid Nur Baksh, who defeated the Buddhist lamas in debate and converted the people to Islam.

A Yabghu (Tibetan spelling: Yagbo) family controlled Khaplu from some uncertain date (c. 850 according to tradition). In the 18th century, the Chorbat area was given by its ruler, Yabgo Yahya Khan of Khaplu to his son Yagbo Nasir Khan, who came to live in Turtuk. The present headman of Turtuk traces his descent from him.

=== Modern history ===
The Chorbat area, during the last three centuries, continuously changed hands between the rulers of Skardu, Khaplu and Ladakh, before coming under the suzerainty of Dogra Kingdom in the mid-19th century. Between 1834 and 1840, the Dogra general Zorawar Singh conquered both Ladakh and Baltistan and made them part of the Sikh Empire. Under the Treaty of Amritsar, the areas were transferred to Maharaja Gulab Singh to form part of the new princely state of Jammu and Kashmir under the suzerainty of the British. Baltistan was at first administered as a wazarat with 15 ilaqas, with Chorbat being one of them. Later, Ladakh and Baltistan formed a joint Ladakh Wazarat whose capital alternated between Leh and Skardu for six months each year.

=== India–Pakistan conflicts ===
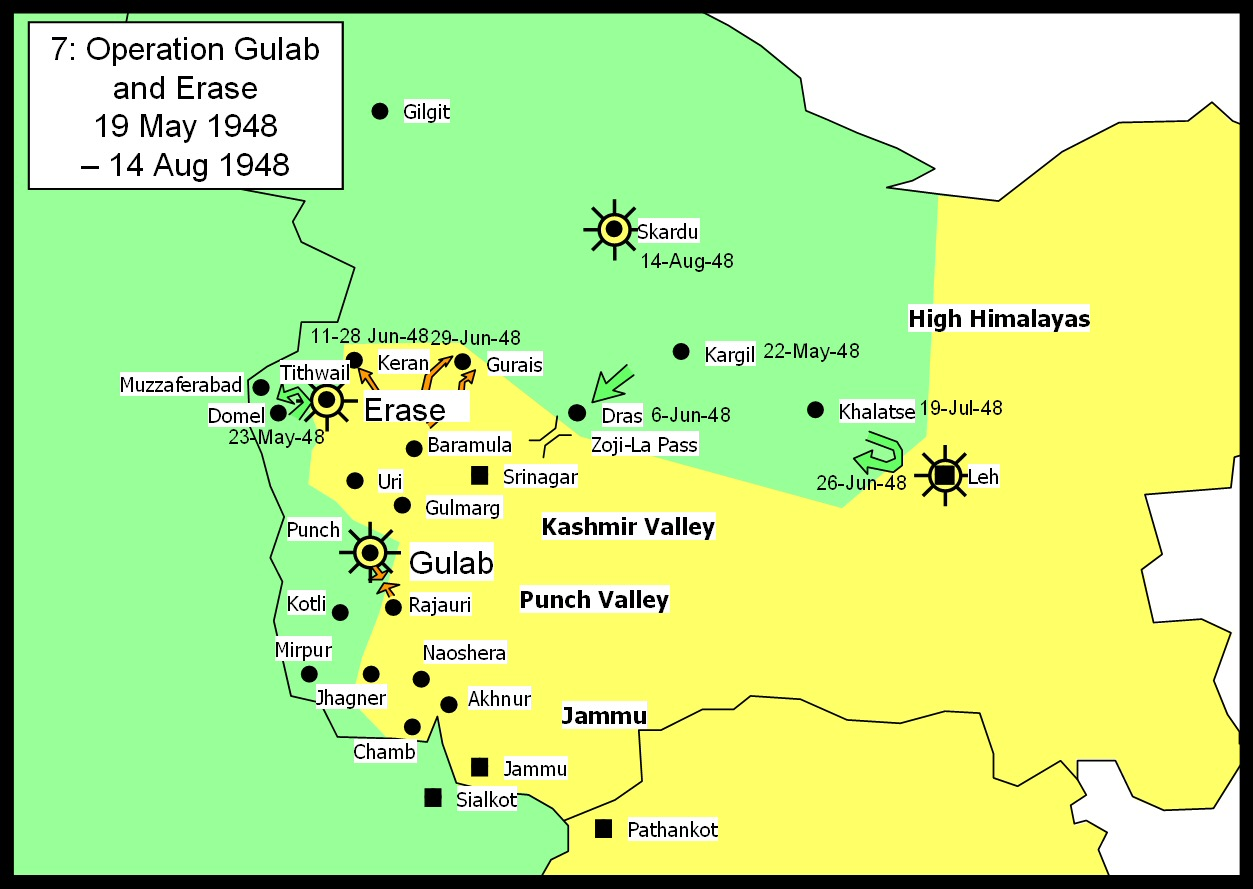
Indo-Pakistani War of 1947–1948

In 1947, after the independence of the Dominion of India and Dominion of Pakistan, Jammu and Kashmir faced rebellion in its western districts followed by tribal invasion with Pakistani support, which provoked the Maharaja of Jammu and Kashmir to join India. Maharaja's accession to India prompted the Gilgit Scouts in the north to rebel and overthrow the Maharaja's administration. The Gilgit Scouts and Muslim members of Jammu and Kashmir State Forces stationed in the area organised themselves under the command of Colonel Aslam Khan, and launched an invasion on the Ladakh wazarat. By July–August 1948, the Gilgit Scouts had captured Kargil, Skardu and the Zoji La pass that connects Ladakh to the Kashmir Valley, reaching the vicinity of Leh.

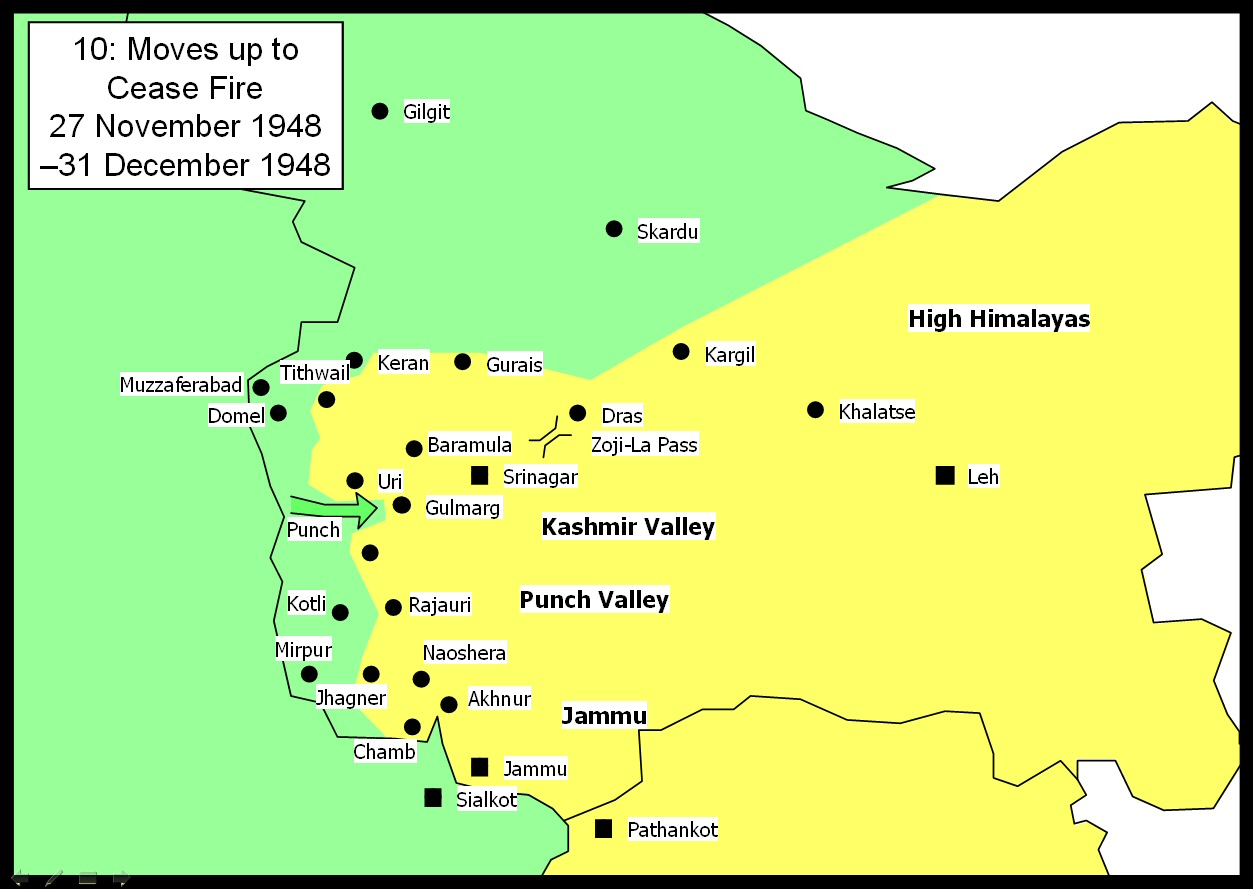
Position at the end of 1948

The fall of Leh to rebels was prevented by reinforcement through air and a tortuous mountain caravan from Himachal Pradesh. The Indian Army raised a local militia called the Nubra Guards under the command of Chewang Rinchen, which reportedly blocked various passage routes to Leh. The Gilgit Scouts were progressively pushed back beyond the line connecting the Chorbat La pass and Chalunka. The ceasefire line was established through these two points at the end of 1948. The entire Chorbat ilaqa came under the control of Pakistan. Bogdang, never a part of the ilaqa, remained under Indian control.

Under Pakistani control, Gilgit dominated Baltistan, and both regions were administered as non-descript "Northern Areas" by the Federal government of Pakistan. Chorbat was merged into the Khaplu niabat in this period.

Position at the end of 1972

India and Pakistan fought two further wars over Jammu & Kashmir. In the 1965 war, the region saw some action, but the two countries returned to status quo after the war. In the war of 1971, Rinchen's Nubra Guards, now part of the Ladakh Scouts, captured further areas of Chorbat. They first took a 18,620-foot peak overlooking Chalunka. The two companies of Karakoram Scouts defending Chalunka were overpowered and retreated to Turtuk. Turtuk was then taken in four days, followed by Tyakshi and Thang. The villagers were frightened at first, but Rinchen reportedly alleviated their fears.

=== Division between India and Pakistan ===
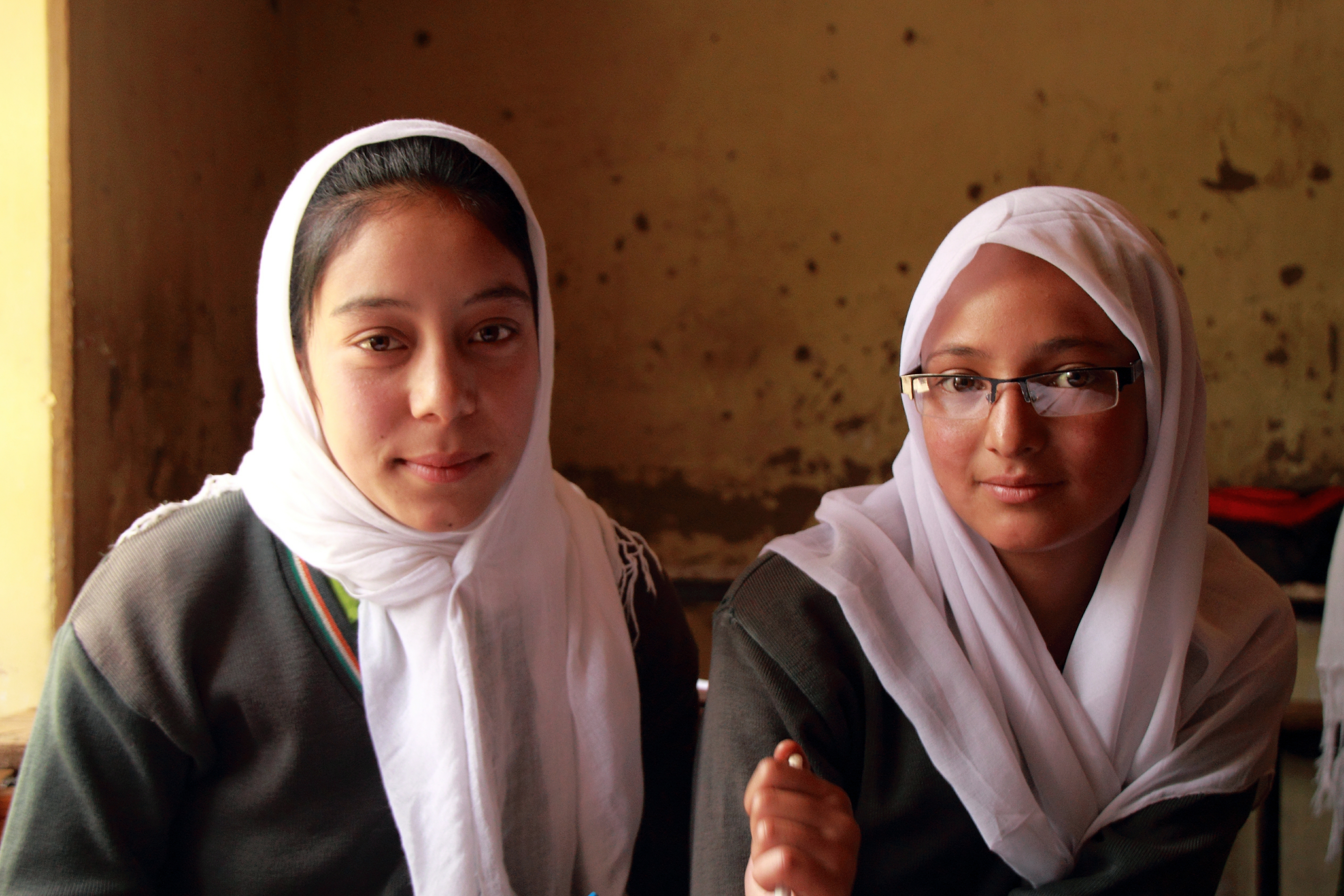
School girls in Turtuk

After the 1971 war, India and Pakistan reached the Simla Agreement, whereby the ceasefire line of the war became the new Line of Control, permanently dividing Chorbat between India and Pakistan. , Antía Mato Bouzas quotes a Balti soldier, whose village came under Indian control, who alleged that Pakistani prime minister Zulfikar Ali Bhutto did not care about the Balti villages captured by India and neglected to negotiate their return unlike the areas in Pakistan administered Jammu & Kashmir.

The citizenship of these village residents changed from Pakistan to India overnight. Aaquib Khan, an Indian journalist, claims that India treated the villagers well and integrated them into the national mainstream. During an interview to Khan, a villager reportedly praised the role of Indian Army in this regard. However, villagers who had gone to other parts of Pakistan before the war, for trade, study or travel, remained on the Pakistani side, never allowed to return home. Khan further claims that one member of a divided family reported going to the border carrying a white flag and a letter from the Indian Army, wanting to bring back his family. But he was detained by the Pakistani Army on the suspicions of being an Indian spy and refused return to home.

Balti activist Senge Sering claims that Pakistan's Inter-Services Intelligence (ISI) attempted to introduce jihad into this area. Local people were uncertain about their loyalties because they had lived under both Pakistani and Indian control, and some served in the Pakistan Army before India's take-over. Many of them also had relatives across the Line of Control who were subject to intimidation by the ISI. During the Kargil infiltration by Pakistan, some local people were suspected of having assisted the infiltrators. The Indian Army took some of them into custody, but later reportedly released them all, says Sering.

=== Alleged Indian intrusions ===
Pakistani sources allege that, in 1972, shortly after the signing of the Shimla Agreement, Indian troops crossed the Line of Control (LoC) in the Chorbat La sector and seized about four square miles of Pakistan administered territory. In 1988, India again crossed the LoC and seized four Pakistani posts in the Qamar sector, which lies between the Chorbat Valley and NJ9842.

== Resources ==
Agriculture is only possible in the valley in summer due to extremely cold winters. Crops include beans and maize. The mountains and surrounding have generally no forests however there are some shrubs and herbs available which are generally used by the local communities as medicinal herbs, there is also a human-made forest of saplings which is the largest forest in the whole district. The Shyok River passing nearby the valley is one of the important resources of the area, irrigating the whole land. However the same river sometime creates havoc during summer through its unpredictable floods.

== See also ==
- Aryan Valley
- Geography of Ladakh
- Tourism in Ladakh

== Bibliography ==
- Gazetteer of Kashmir and Ladak, Calcutta: Superintendent of Government Printing, 1890 – via archive.org
- Afridi, Banat Gul (1988), Baltistan in History, Emjay Books International
- Bhattacharji, Romesh (2012), Ladakh: Changing, Yet Unchanged, New Delhi: Rupa Publications – via Academia.edu
- Bouzas, Antía Mato (February 2017), "(B)Ordering and the Politics of Belonging", St Antony's International Review, 12 (2): 114–135
- Chakravorty, B. (1995), Stories of Heroism: PVC & MVC Winners, Allied Publishers, pp. 139–140, ISBN 978-81-7023-516-3
- Drew, Frederic (1875), The Jummoo and Kashmir Territories: A Geographical Account, E. Stanford – via archive.org
- Enriquez, Colin Metcalfe (1915), The Realm of the Gods: A Tale of Travel in Kangra, Mandi, Kulu, Chamba, Kishtwar, Kashmir, Ladakh and Baltistan, Thacker, Spink – via archive.org
- Khan, Aaquib (15 April 2017), "Turtuk: A Promised Land Between Two Hostile Neighbours", The Wire
- Rao, K. V. Krishna (1991), Prepare Or Perish: A Study of National Security, Lancer Publishers, ISBN 978-81-7212-001-6
- Vohra, Rohit (1990), "Mythic Lore and Historical Documents from Nubra Valley in Ladakh", Acta Orientalia Academiae Scientiarum Hungaricae, 44 (1/2), Akadémiai Kiadó: 225–239, JSTOR 23658122
