= Avishai Margalit =

Israeli academic philosopher (born 1939)

- אבישי מרגלית
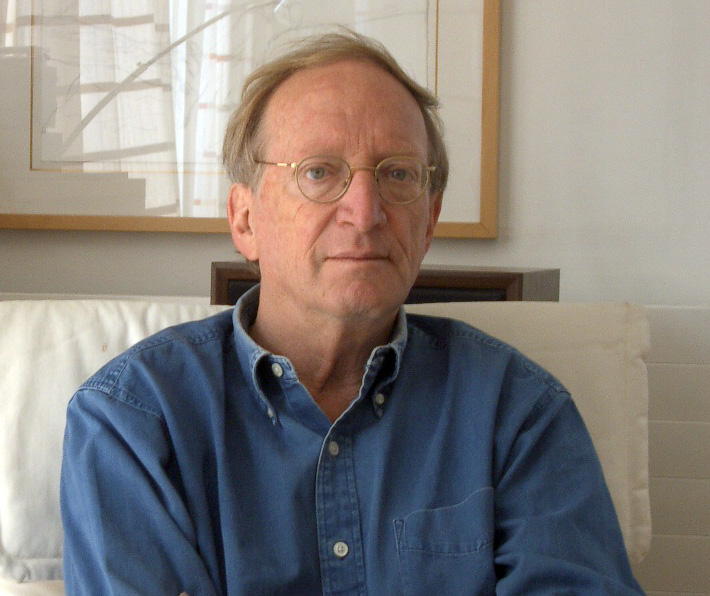
- Born: 1939 (age 86–87); Afula, Mandatory Palestine
- Occupation: Philosopher
- Spouse: Edna Ullmann-Margalit
- Awards: Ernst Bloch Prize, Spinozalens Prize, EMET Prize, Israel Prize

Education
- Education: The Queens College, Oxford University
- Doctoral advisor: Yehoshua Bar-Hillel

Philosophical work
- School: Marxism
- Institutions: Hebrew University of Jerusalem, Institute for Advanced Study
- Main interests: language, political philosophy, logic, ethics, meta-ethics
- Notable works: Occidentalism: The West in the Eyes of its Enemies
- Notable ideas: Occidentalism

Avishai Margalit (Hebrew: אבישי מרגלית; born 1939) is an Israeli professor emeritus in philosophy at the Hebrew University of Jerusalem. From 2006 to 2011, he served as the George F. Kennan Professor at the Institute for Advanced Study in Princeton.

== Early life and education ==
Avishai Margalit was born in Afula, Mandatory Palestine, and grew up in Jerusalem. He attended high school at the Hebrew University Secondary School. He was educated in Jerusalem and did his army service in the airborne Nahal. In 1960 he started his studies at the Hebrew University, majoring in philosophy and economics. He earned his B.A. in 1963 and his M.A. in philosophy in 1965, his M.A. thesis focusing on Karl Marx's theory of labor. During his years of study he worked as an instructor in a youth village, working with immigrant children who arrived with the mass wave of immigration in the 1950s. Thanks to a British Council scholarship he went to Queens College in Oxford University, where he stayed from 1968 to 1970. His doctoral dissertation, "The Cognitive Status of Metaphors", written under the supervision of Professor Yehoshua Bar-Hillel, earned him his Ph.D summa cum laude 1970 from the Hebrew University.

== Career ==
In 1970, Margalit started teaching as an assistant professor at the philosophy department of the Hebrew University where he stayed throughout his academic career, climbing the ladder of academic promotions. In 1998–2006 he was appointed the Shulman Professor of Philosophy, and in 2006 he retired as a professor emeritus from the Hebrew University. Since 2006 Margalit has been the George Kennan Professor at the Institute for Advanced Study in Princeton, New Jersey. He is also a member of the Center for the Study of Rationality at the Hebrew University.

Margalit was a visiting scholar at Harvard University (1974–5); a visiting fellow at Wolfson College, Oxford (1979–80); a visiting professor at the Free University of Berlin and a fellow at the Max Planck Institute, Berlin (1984–5); a visiting fellow at St Antony's College, Oxford (1990); a Rockefeller fellow at the Center for Human Values, Princeton University (1995–6), a scholar at the Russell Sage Foundation in New York (2001–2002) and Senior Fellow at the Global Law Program at NYU (2004–5). In addition, he held short-term visiting professorships at the Central European University in Budapest and at the European University Institute in Florence. In 1999, Margalit delivered the Horkheimer Lectures at the University of Frankfurt, on The Ethics of Memory. In 2001–2002 he delivered the inaugural lectures at Oxford University as the first Bertelsman Professor there. In 2005 he delivered the Tanner Lectures at Stanford University.

=== Political activity ===
Margalit was among the founders of the Moked political party in 1973 and contributed to the writing of its platform. He was fifteenth on the party's list for the 1973 Knesset elections, but the party won only one seat. In 1975, he participated in the founding of the Israeli Council for Israeli-Palestinian Peace, and in 1978 he belonged to the first group of leaders of Peace Now. In addition, in the 1990s, Margalit served on the board of B'Tselem, the Israeli Information Center for Human Rights in the Occupied Territories.

=== New York Review of Books contributions ===
Since 1984, Margalit has been a frequent contributor to the New York Review of Books (NYRB), where he published articles on social, cultural and political issues; his political profiles included Yitzhak Rabin, Ariel Sharon, Yitzhak Shamir and Shimon Peres, as well as cultural-philosophical profiles of thinkers like Baruch Spinoza, Martin Buber and Yeshayahu Leibowitz. A collection of his NYRB articles was published by Farrar, Straus and Giroux, under the title Views in Review: Politics and Culture in the State of the Jews (1998).

== Academic research ==
=== Research areas and philosophical approach ===
Margalit's early research topics included the philosophy of language and of logic, general analytical philosophy and the concept of rationality. Gradually he shifted toward social and political philosophy, the philosophy of religion and culture, and the philosophical implications of social and cognitive psychology.

In the preface to his book The Ethics of Memory, Margalit offers a distinction between "i.e. philosophy" and "e.g. philosophy". The idea is to distinguish between explicating philosophy, based on conceptual analysis, and exemplifying philosophy, which focuses on real-life examples from history or literature. Without judging between the two, Margalit adopts the second approach. Most of his work since the 1990s reflects this approach to the analysis of philosophical questions.

In contrast to many in the philosophical tradition, who tend to accompany their abstract philosophical discussion with examples that are intentionally artificial or trivial, Margalit often starts from historical examples, whose richness and complexity precede their theoretical conceptualization. Through analyzing these examples he gradually builds up concepts and distinctions that serve him as the philosophical tools needed for the understanding of the phenomena he investigates.

Thus, for example, in his Ethics of Memory he uses the case of an officer who forgets the name of one of his subordinate soldiers who was killed in a heroic battle, as a test-case for discussing the issue of the moral responsibility that attaches to memory, on the one hand, and of the centrality of names in constituting memory, on the other. He also poses the following dilemma: were you a painter, would you prefer your paintings to survive you after your death, even if your name will be forgotten, or would you rather have your name remembered even if none of your paintings survive. Margalit's way of philosophizing reflects historical, literary and cultural insights and concerns that are not ordinarily encountered in philosophical discussions.

=== Idolatry ===
Written jointly with Margalit's doctoral student Moshe Halbertal, the book Idolatry presents the history of the notion of idolatry and discusses its religious and ideological significance and ramifications. Based largely on the philosophy of language and on the philosophy of Wittgenstein (whom Margalit had studied for many years), the book argues that the critique of ideology finds its first expression in the critique of idolatry. Idolatry, on this view, is not just an error but a sinful error; as such it makes the idolaters miss their life's purposes. Bacon's critique of the tribal gods, and the critique of political ideology in the sense Marx used it, are shown to be the continuation of this move concerning the attitude toward the sinful and sin-causing error.

=== The Decent Society ===
From Plato on, political philosophy has dealt with the question of the just society, but not with the question of the decent society. In the book The Decent Society, Margalit argues that the pursuit of decency, understood primarily in terms of the absence of humiliation, takes precedence over the pursuit of the ideal of justice.

A decent society, in Margalit's view, is a society whose institutions do not humiliate its members. He presents the logical, moral and cognitive reasons for choosing "philosophica negativa": it is not justice that brings us to politics but injustice – the avoidance of evil rather than the pursuit of the good. In contrast to the elusiveness of the abstract notion of human dignity, the phenomenon of humiliation is tangible and instantly recognizable; so too is the notion of evil associated with it.

In essence, Margalit argues that the ideal of the decent, non-humiliating society is not only more urgent but also a more realistic and achievable ideal than that of the just society. He examines the essential manifestations of the decent society: respect for privacy, full citizenship, full employment, and resisting the trend to replace mechanisms of just distribution with organs of welfare and charity. In the second part of the book Margalit gives an account of institutions that are in particular danger of generating humiliation, like prisons, the security services, the army, and the media. The New York Review of Books’ coverage of the work noted that Margalit’s framework makes the protection of individuals from degrading treatment the most fundamental requirement of a politics of dignity. By focusing on tangible forms of humiliation, the idea of dignity gains practical force making the framework especially relevant for political systems seeking to uphold dignity in practice.

To a large extent because of its discussion of the idea of humiliation, Margalit's book has become a major source for the study of the notions of human dignity and human respect, which constitute the cornerstones of contemporary ethics, politics and legal theory. The book offers a deep analysis of the entire semantic field of the notions of dignity, respect, self-respect, honor, esteem, and their cognates. Margalit presents a "skeptical" solution to the question of human dignity. Rather than attempting to tie it to a particular characteristic shared by all humans and intrinsically worthy of respect (an attempt he believes has failed in the history of philosophy), Margalit proposes to turn this explanation on its head: the practice of according humans respect, he suggests, precedes the idea of human dignity as a character trait. This move does not evade the problem of human dignity, Margalit argues, but rather it points the way toward salvaging it from the futile and inconclusive metaphysical analysis.

=== The Ethics of Memory ===
The book The Ethics of Memory takes up the question of the duties of memory. While fundamental in the Jewish tradition, the obligation to remember ("zachor") is rarely brought up in philosophical discussions. In general, memory is not regarded as a moral concern: people remember or forget as a matter of fact, and since normally we do not control our memory, theories of ethics do not consider memory a duty. In this book, Margalit explores the evaluative and ethical dimensions of memory both in the private and in the collective spheres.

The question whether we are under a moral obligation to remember (or to forget) certain things is discussed in the book in light of a central distinction Margalit introduces, between ethics and morality. Duties of memory exist, he claims, with regard to our ethical relationships, namely the "thick" relationships we have with the members of our tribe, family, nation and circle of friends – namely, those with whom we have a shared history. Without memory there is no community; memory is a constitutive element in the making of a community. Our moral relationships, on the other hand, are "thin". Morality regulates the relationships we have with others who are strangers to us and to whom nothing more concrete ties us than our shared humanity. Regarding our moral relationships, Margalit contends, there are no obligations to remember.

One of Margalit's central theses in the book is that a "community of memory", as a political concept, is more significant and weighty than the notion of the nation. Memory forms a large part of our relationships, and a faulty memory damages the quality or strength of our thick relationships. In addition to the large question of the duty to remember, the book takes up a variety of other questions like what is a moral witness, what is a community of memory, how do we remember feelings (as distinct from moods), what is the proper relationship between remembering and forgetting, does remembering aid forgiving or does it rather hinder it, and more. Margalit believes that memory is the key to our ethical relationships, and that communities of memory are built upon a network of divisions of labor for the different representations of memory. These networks are constituted, in part, of particular people who remember the past and whose job it is to deal with it, like historians, archivists and journalists, and also of the idea that the large social network connects us all.

=== Occidentalism: the West in the Eyes of its Enemies ===
This book Occidentalism: the West in the Eyes of its Enemies, written jointly with the writer and journalist Ian Buruma, originated in a 2002 article in the New York Review of Books. According to the book, Occidentalism is a worldview that influences many, often conflicting, ideologies. As a view of the West and Western civilization, it is infused with strong elements of de-humanization: the Western man, in this view, is a machine-like creature. He is efficient yet soul-less, emotionally obtuse and led by a perverse value system.

The book claims that the occidental worldview is itself rooted in the West. It emerges, the authors argue, out of the Romantic Movement, especially in its German version, later to be taken up by the Slavophile movement. In the 20th century it can be traced to fascism – prominently in its German and Japanese varieties – on the one hand, and to communist Maoism on the other. Nowadays it is political Islam that is thoroughly imbued with a particularly pernicious version of Occidentalism. In it, the additional idea is found, that the West, via its representatives who are currently ruling many Muslim countries, is the carrier of a new Jahiliyya – namely, ignorance and barbarism of the sort that ruled the world before the evangelical mission of the prophet Mohammed.

=== On Compromise and Rotten Compromises ===
The book On Compromise and Rotten Compromises deals with political compromises: what compromises are morally acceptable and what are to be rejected as unacceptable, or "rotten". The argument of the book assigns great value to the spirit of compromise in politics, while warning against rotten ones. A rotten compromise is taken to be a compromise with a regime that exercises inhuman policies, namely systematic behavior that mixes cruelty with humiliation or and treats humans as inhuman.

The book examines central historical examples, like the Great Compromise that paved the way for the US constitution, which accepted the institution of slavery despite its inhuman, cruel and humiliating nature. Other test cases include the Munich agreement and the Yalta agreement – working from the assumption that WWII is a sort of laboratory for testing out our moral-political concepts and intuitions. The forced return by the Allies of the Russian POWs to Joseph Stalin's hands served in the book as a paradigm case of a rotten compromise.

On Compromise focuses on the tension between peace and justice, and warns against seeing these two as complementary products, like fish and chips. The author claims that compromise is justified for the sake of peace, sometimes even at the expense of justice. Yet rotten compromises, totally unjustifiable that they are, are to be avoided come what may.

=== On Betrayal ===
In On Betrayal, Margalit argues for and investigates the persistent significance of betrayal. He identifies four main types of betrayal, belonging to four spheres of human experience: political betrayal (treason), personal betrayal (adultery), religious betrayal (apostasy), and betrayal of one's class. The book defends the significance of the concept of betrayal even in modern societies, where treason no longer carries the weight it once did, where adultery is not a crime, and where apostasy, or changing one's religious affiliation, is considered a basic right. Building on his earlier distinction between thick and thin relations, Margalit argues that betrayal still matters because thick relations still matter and betrayal is the undermining of thick relations. "The basic claim in the book is that betrayal is betrayal of a thick human relationship. A thick human relationship comes very close to what fraternity means. So betrayal is the flip side of fraternity" (2).

By Margalit's analysis, betrayal is a ternary relation, that is a relation holding between three objects. Thus the standard form of betrayal is: A betrays B with/to C. For betrayal to occur the relations between A and B must be thick relations. In cases of double betrayal, the betrayed stands in thick relations to both the betrayer and the one with whom the betrayal took place (e.g.: A betrayed B with her best friend C). Thick political relations should be based neither on blood, nor on seed, nor on soil, but on shared historical memory. They consist in "thick trust". Its breach is political betrayal, or treason. Idolatry is the betrayal of thick relations with god and apostasy of thick relations with one's religious community.

Thick relations provide individuals with a sense of meaning and belonging, an orientation in the world, a home. The feature of thick relations which is eroded by betrayal is belonging, rather than trust. Belonging is not based on achievement, it is not a possession, but a bond. Betrayal undermines this bond because it "provides the betrayed party with a good reason to reevaluate the meaning of the thick relation with the betrayer" (92). But its ethical significance consists in the kind of reason it provides for this reevaluation, namely the violation of a commitment. As Michael Walzer summarizes in his review of the book, "betrayal isn't leaving a relationship but breaking it––and breaking it in a way that hurts, that leaves the other or others vulnerable, frightened, alone, at a loss."

However, not every case of disloyalty toward a thick relation is an instance of betrayal, only disloyalty to relations deserving of loyalty constitute betrayal. This gives rise to ambiguities and disagreements. Betrayal, Margalit says, is an essentially contested concept, "that is to say, in all its uses the concept of traitor is always subject to dispute along ideological lines" (24). When an alleged traitor is caught between two competing deserving loyalties, he will be regarded by one side as a traitor and by the other as a hero. When one of the loyalties is morally undeserved, the actor is either an uncontestable hero (Willy Brandt is an example) or an uncontestable traitor (e.g. Benedict Arnold). Assessments of deservedness can vary not only across societies, but also within societies. This is often the case with whistleblowers, like Edward Snowden and Chelsea Manning, seen by some as heroes and by others as traitors. The difference between a traitor worthy of contempt and a whistleblower worthy of applause, Margalit says, consists in the righteousness of their cause and the purity of their motives. The fact that both can be mixed and ambiguous explains why public opinion is often split in such cases.

Besides the four general kinds of betrayal, the book explores specific forms of potential betrayal, including collaboration with an enemy, class betrayal, secrecy and hypocrisy. It investigates with nuance complicated historical cases like Josephus Flavius, Willy Brandt, and Marshal Petain ("Petain betrayed by trying to form a France that would eradicate the memory and the legacy of the French Revolution" (215)).

== Awards ==
- In December 2001, Margalit received the Spinoza Lens Prize, awarded by the International Spinoza Foundation for "a significant contribution to the normative debate on society."
- In November 2007, he received the EMET Prize, awarded annually by the Prime Minister of Israel for "excellence in academic and professional achievements that have far-reaching influence and significant contribution to society."
- In April 2010, he was awarded Israel Prize, for philosophy.
- In May 2011 he was awarded the Dr. Leopold Lucas Prize of the University of Tübingen.
- In 2011 he was elected to the Israel Arts and Science Academy.
- He was elected as honorary associate at Queens College at Oxford University.
- In May 2012 he receives Philosophical Book Award 2012 by FIPH.
- In September 2012 he received the Ernst Bloch Prize.

He was elected to the American Philosophical Society in 2018.

== Family ==
Avishai Margalit was married to Edna Ullmann-Margalit, a professor of philosophy at the Hebrew University. She died in October 2010. He has four children and lives in Jerusalem.

== Publications ==
=== Books ===
- Idolatry (jointly with Moshe Halbertal), Harvard University Press, 1992.
- The Decent Society, Harvard University Press, 1996.
- Views in Review: Politics and Culture in the State of the Jews, Farrar, Straus and Giroux, 1998.
- The Ethics of Memory, Harvard University Press, 2002. ISBN 978-0-674-00941-7 (A partial German version of this book, Ethik der Erinnerung, was published by Fischer Taschenbuch Verlag in 2000.)
- Occidentalism: The West in the Eyes of Its Enemies (with Ian Buruma), New York: The Penguin Press, 2004. ISBN 978-0-14-303487-2
- On Compromise And Rotten Compromises, Princeton University Press, 2010
- On Betrayal, Harvard University Press, 2017
- Captive Minds: A Study in Manipulation (with Assaf Sharon), Princeton University Press, 2026.

=== Books edited ===
- Meaning and Use, D. Reidel Publishing Company, Dordrecht-Holland 1979.
- Isaiah Berlin: A Celebration (jointly with Edna Ullmann-Margalit), The Hogarth Press, 1991.
- Semantic truth theories / Yael Cohen. Jerusalem : Magnes Press, Hebrew University of Jerusalem, 1994.
- Amnestie (jointly with Garry Smith), Suhrkamp Verlag, 1998.

=== Selected articles ===
==== Philosophy of language ====
- "Vagueness in Vogue", Synthese, Vol. 33, 1976, pp. 211–221.
- "The 'Platitude' Principle of Semantics", Erkenntnis, Vol. 13, 1978, pp. 377–395.
- "Open Texture", in: Avishai Margalit (ed.), Meaning and Use, D. Reidel / Dordrecht-Holland, 1979, pp. 141–152.
- "Sense and Science", in: S. Saarinen, R. Hilpinen, I Niiniluoto and Provence Hintikka (eds.), Essays in Honor of Jaakko Hintikka, D. Reidel / Dordrecht-Holland, 1979, pp. 17–47.
- "Meaning and Monsters", Synthese 44, 1980, pp. 313–346.
- "Analyticity by way of Presumption" (jointly with Edna Ullmann-Margalit), Canadian Journal of Philosophy 12:3 (1980), pp. 435–452.

==== Logic and rationality ====
- "Newcomb's Problem Revisited" (jointly with M. Bar-Hillel), British Journal for the Philosophy of Science, Vol. 23, 1972, pp. 295–304.
- "The Irrational, the Unreasonable, and the Wrong" (jointly with M. Bar-Hillel), Behavioral and Brain Sciences, 1981.
- "Gideon's Paradox – a Paradox of Rationality" (jointly with M. Bar-Hillel), Synthese, Vol. 63, 1985, pp. 139–155.
- "How Vicious are Cycles of Intransitive Choice?" (jointly with M. Bar-Hillel), Theory and Decision, Vol. 24, 1988, pp. 119–145.
- "Holding True and Holding as True" (jointly with Edna Ullmann-Margalit), Synthese, Vol. 92, 1992, pp. 167–187.
- "Rationality and Comprehension" (jointly with Menachem Yaari), in: Kenneth J. Arrow, Enrico Colombatto, Mark Perlman and Christian Schmidt, The Rational Foundations of Economic Behavior, MacMillan Press, 1996, pp. 89–101.

==== Ethics and politics ====
- "National Self-Determination" (jointly with Joseph Raz), The Journal of Philosophy, Vol. 87, 1990, pp. 439–461.
- "Liberalism and the Right to Culture" (jointly with Moshe Halbertal), Social Research, Vol. 61, 1994, pp. 491–510.
- "The Uniqueness of the Holocaust" (jointly with Gabriel Motzkin), Philosophy and Public Affairs, Vol. 25, 1996, 65–83.
- "Decent Equality and Freedom", Social Research Vol. 64, 1997, pp. 147–160. (The entire spring issue of this volume is dedicated to Margalit's The Decent Society).
- "Recognition", Supplement to the Proceedings of the Aristotelian Society, Vol. 7, July 2001, pp 127–139.
- "The Lesser Evil", London: Proceedings of the Royal Institute of Philosophy, 2004.
- "Sectarianism", Dissent, Winter 2008.

== See also ==
- List of Israel Prize recipients
