= Siksa, Chorbat =

Village in northern Pakistan

Siksa سکسا
- Union Council
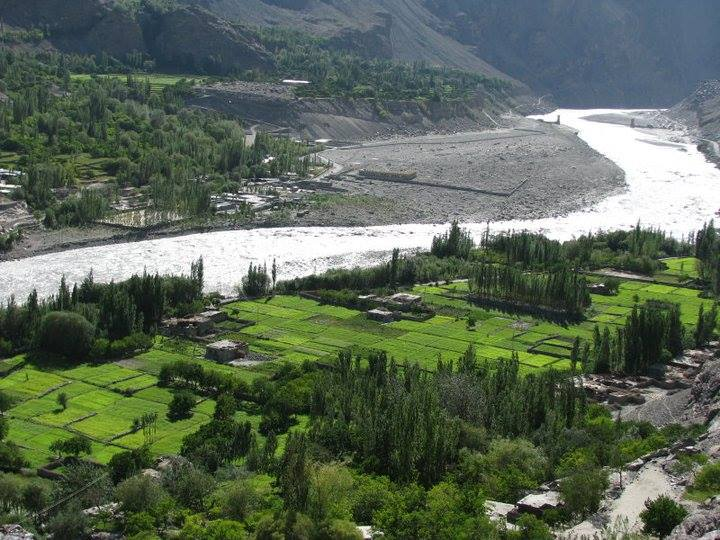
- Shyok River passing Siksa

- Siksa in Gilgit-Baltistan
- Coordinates: 34°55′48″N 76°36′57″E
- Country: Pakistan
- Autonomous territory: Gilgit Baltistan
- District: Ghanche
- Tehsil: Chorbat
- Elevation: 2,725 m (8,940 ft)
- Time zone: UTC+5 (PST)
- Postal code: 16801

Siksa (Urdu: سکسا) is a village and union council in the Chorbat tehsil, Ghanche District of Gilgit-Baltistan, lying 150 kilometres (93 mi) east of Skardu, near the Line of Control at an elevation of 2,725 metres (8,940 ft).

== History ==
In historical travel writings, Siksa is referred to as "Chorbat village". It is also described as the principal village of the Chorbat ilaqa, where the officials of Chorbat lived. Siksa is at the end of the Chorbat Lungpa valley, which leads to the Chorbat La pass, the historical route between Baltistan and Ladakh.

The language spoken is Balti. The entire population is Muslim of the Noorbakhshia and Ahl-i Hadith sects.

== Etymology ==
The name "Siksa" is believed to be derived from the Balti word meaning "a land with shortage of water". For hundreds of years this village has struggled for access to water for agriculture. Different community projects were started to meet the need for water. One of the major projects was initiated in the early 19th century to construct a channel from its eastern border which resulted in the fulfilment of agricultural needs.

== Geography ==
Siksa has an average elevation of about 8,950 feet (2,730 m), and is situated along the banks of the Shyok River, a tributary of the Indus. Villages near Siksa includes Kalan, Sogmos, Chuar and Siari.

== Resources ==
The natural resources of the village include agriculture, horticultural resources, the Shyok River, mountains and peaks. The agriculture in the village is only summer based due to extreme cold in the winter where temperature goes to -10 C. The crops include some beans, maize, potatoes, and other food crops however communities have experimented less with the agriculture due to the natural limiting factors i.e. extreme cold.

== Transport ==
Siksa is accessible only by the road, The normal route to Siksa is via Shyok Valley Road, that connect it to the District Headquarters Khaplu and to Skardu. The climate can have adverse effects on transport in and out of the Siksa, as the roads in and out of can be blocked for weeks.
