= Najeeba Arif =

Pakistani writer and poet

Najeeba Arif is a Pakistani writer, poet, academic, and translator known for her contribution to Urdu literature and research. She currently serves as the Chairperson of the Pakistan Academy of Letters (PAL), becoming the first woman to hold the post. Najeeba Arif has published some research articles and books on Urdu literature.

== Works ==
- Mukhotā (مکھوٹا – Urdu novel). Lahore: Aks Publications, 2023.
- Nawāḥ-e-Kāzima (نواحِ کاظمہ – translation of Qasida Burda Sharif from Arabic into Urdu). Islamabad: Aimal Publications, 2022.
- Rāgnī kī Khoj meñ (راگنی کی کھوج میں, memoirs). Lahore: Qausain Publishers, 2020
- Safar mulk-e-Oudh: Yūsuf Khān Kambalposh kā nādir wa ghair matbūʿa safarnāma (1847) (سیر ملک اودھ، یوسف خان کمبل پوش کا نادر وغیر مطبوعہ سفرنامہ). Lahore: Cooperative Society, 2017.
- Maʿānī se Ziyādah (معانی سے زیاده, first poetry collection). Karachi: Sheherzade, 2015. (Awarded "Best Book of the Year" at Karachi Literature Festival by Oxford University Press).
- 9/11 aur Pakistani Urdu Afsāna: Adab kā nav-muzāḥimatī rujḥān (نو گیارہ اور پاکستانی اردو افسانہ: اردو ادب کا نو مزاحمتی رُجحان, critical introduction and selected stories). Islamabad: Poorab Academy, 2011.
- Mumtaz Mufti kā Fikrī Irtiqā: Nafsiyāt, Taṣawwuf aur Qurʾān (ممتاز مفتی کا فکری ارتقا: نفسیات، تصوف اور قرآن, research monograph). Lahore: Al-Faisal Nashran, 2011.
- Rafta o āinda: Urdu adab kā manẓar-nāmah (رفتہ و آئنده، اردو ادب کا منظر نامہ). Islamabad: Poorab Academy, 2008.
- Mumtaz Mufti: Shakhsiyat aur Fan (ممتاز مفتی: شخصیت اور فن, "Makers of Pakistani Literature" series). Islamabad: Pakistan Academy of Letters, 2007.
- Janoob Asiai Musalmaanon Ki Gharb Shanasi (جنوب ایشیائی مسلمانوں کی غرب شناسی). Lahore: Sang-e-Meel Publications, 2026.

== Honours ==
Arif’s essays were included in the special issue of the periodical Sahifa published on Iftikhar Arif.
