= Ian Buruma =

Dutch writer and editor

- Born: 28 December 1951 (age 74); The Hague, Netherlands
- Occupations: Writer, historian
- Writing career
- Genre: Nonfiction
- Subjects: China, Japan, Occidentalism, Orientalism

Ian Buruma (born 28 December 1951) is a Dutch writer and editor who lives and works in the United States. In 2017, he became editor of The New York Review of Books, but left the position in September 2018.

Much of his writing has focused on the culture of Asia, particularly that of China and 20th-century Japan. He is the Paul W. Williams Professor of Human Rights and Journalism at Bard College.

== Early life and education ==
Buruma was born and raised in The Hague, Netherlands. His father, Sytze Leonard "Leo" Buruma, was a Dutch lawyer and son of a Mennonite minister; his mother, Gwendolyn Margaret "Wendy" Schlesinger, was a Briton of German-Jewish descent. He went to study at Leiden University in 1971, and obtained a Candidate degree in Chinese literature and history in 1975. He subsequently pursued postgraduate studies in Japanese cinema from 1975 to 1977 at the College of Art (Nichidai Geijutsu Gakko) of the Nihon University in Tokyo, Japan.

== Career ==
=== Overview ===
Buruma worked as a film reviewer, photographer, and documentary filmmaker in Japan between 1975 and 1981. During the 1980s, he edited the cultural section of the Far Eastern Economic Review in Hong Kong. He later traveled throughout Asia working as a freelance writer. In 1991, he was foreign editor of The Spectator in London. Buruma has contributed numerous articles to The New York Review of Books since 1985 and has written for The Guardian. He held fellowships at the Wissenschaftskolleg in Berlin (1991) and the Woodrow Wilson International Center for Scholars in Washington, D.C. (1999), and he was an Alistair Horne fellow of St Antony's College in Oxford, United Kingdom. In 2000, he delivered the Huizinga Lecture (on "Neoromanticism of writers in exile") in the Pieterskerk in Leiden, Netherlands.

From 2003 to 2018, Buruma was Professor of Human Rights and Journalism at Bard College in New York. In 2018, he became editor of The New York Review of Books (NYRB), succeeding founding editor Robert B. Silvers.

He has been a regular contributor to Project Syndicate since 2001.

=== New York Review of Books controversy ===
In September 2019, Buruma left the NYRB position following a dispute about his publication of an essay by Canadian talk show host Jian Ghomeshi. Ghomeshi was acquitted in 2016 of one count of choking and four counts of sexual assault after over 20 women complained either to the police or in the media. The publication of the essay was controversial, in part, because Ghomeshi wrote that the allegations against him were "inaccurate". In an interview with Slate magazine, Buruma defended his decision to publish the article. His stated reason was to spark a discussion about non legal punishment by public opinion; how should a person who has been acquitted in a court of law be punished? Buruma denied that the article was misleading because it had failed to mention that Ghomeshi had been required to issue an apology to one of the victims as part of the terms of a case against him, in which he was acquitted. He also denied that the title, "Reflections from a Hashtag", was dismissive of the #MeToo movement; stated that the movement has resulted in "undesirable consequences"; and said: "I'm no judge of the rights and wrongs of every allegation... The exact nature of [Ghomeshi's] behavior – how much consent was involved – I have no idea, nor is it really my concern."

In response to outrage over his defense of the article, the Review leadership later stated that it had departed from its "usual editorial practices" as the essay "was shown to only one male editor during the editing process", a statement Buruma denies, since he has maintained that many more editors were involved, and that Buruma's statement to Slate about the staff of the Review "did not accurately represent their views". More than 100 contributors to the Review, including Joyce Carol Oates and Ian McEwan, signed a letter of protest to express fears that Buruma's exit threatened intellectual culture and "the free exploration of ideas".

== Awards ==
In 2004, Buruma was awarded an Honorary Doctorate (Dr.h.c.) in Theology from the University of Groningen.

In 2008, Buruma was awarded the Erasmus Prize, which is awarded to an individual who has made "an especially important contribution to culture, society or social science in Europe". He was included in Foreign Policy magazine's 2010 list of the "100 top global thinkers".

Buruma has won several prizes for his books, including the Los Angeles Times Book Prize and the PEN/Diamonstein-Spielvogel Award for the Art of the Essay for Theater of Cruelty.

== Personal life and views ==
Buruma has been married twice. He and his first wife, Sumie Tani, had a daughter, as did he and his second wife, Eri Hotta. Buruma is a nephew of the English film director John Schlesinger, with whom he published a series of interviews in book form.

He argued in 2001 for wholehearted British participation in the European Union because they were the "strongest champions in Europe of a liberal approach to commerce and politics".

== Bibliography ==
- Richie, Donald & Ian Buruma (1980). The Japanese Tattoo. Weatherhill.
- Buruma, Ian (1983). Behind the Mask: On Sexual Demons, Sacred Mothers, Transvestites, Gangsters, Drifters, and Other Japanese Cultural Heroes. New American Library.
- A Japanese Mirror: Heroes and Villains of Japanese Culture. London: Jonathan Cape. 1984. ISBN 978-0-224-02049-7.
- Tokyo: Form and Spirit (1986) with James Brandon, Kenneth Frampton, Martin Friedman, Donald Richie ISBN 978-0-8109-1690-6
- God's Dust: A Modern Asian Journey (1989) ISBN 978-0-7538-1089-7
- Great Cities of the World: Hong Kong (1991)
- Playing the Game (1991) novel ISBN 978-0-374-52633-7
- The Wages of Guilt: Memories of War in Germany and in Japan (1994) ISBN 978-0-452-01156-4
- Introduction for Geisha: The Life, the Voices, the Art (1998) by Jodi Cobb ISBN 978-0-375-70180-1
- Voltaire's Coconuts, or Anglomania in Europe (UK title) (1998) ISBN 978-0-7538-0954-9 or Anglomania: A European Love Affair (US title) (1998) ISBN 978-0-375-50206-4
- The Pilgrimage from Tiananmen Square, The New York Times (1999)
- The Missionary and the Libertine: Love and War in East and West (2000) compilation ISBN 978-0-571-21414-3
- De neo-romantiek van schrijvers in exil ("Neoromanticism of writers in exile") (2000) ISBN 978-90-446-0028-5
- Bad Elements: Chinese Rebels from Los Angeles to Beijing (2001) ISBN 978-0-679-78136-3
- Inventing Japan: From Empire to Economic Miracle 1853–1964 (2003) ISBN 978-0-679-64085-1
- Occidentalism: The West in the Eyes of Its Enemies (2004) with Avishai Margalit ISBN 978-0-14-303487-2
- Murder in Amsterdam: The Death of Theo Van Gogh and the Limits of Tolerance (2006) ISBN 978-1-59420-108-0 winner of The Los Angeles Times Book Prize for the Best Current Interest Book.
- Conversations with John Schlesinger (2006) ISBN 978-0-375-75763-1
- Commentary on the History of China for the time period of The Last Emperor, The Criterion Collection 2008 DVDs (ASIN: B000ZM1MIW, ISBN 978-1-60465-014-3).
- The China Lover (2008) novel ISBN 978-1-59420-194-3
- China's class ceiling, published in the Los Angeles Times
- Taming the Gods: Religion and Democracy on Three Continents (2010) ISBN 978-0-691-13489-5, with some historical examples of the value the separation of religion and national governance with the separation of church and state as one example.
- Grenzen aan de vrijheid: van De Sade tot Wilders (Limits to Freedom: From De Sade to Wilders) (2010) ISBN 978-90-477-0262-7 – Essay for the Month of Philosophy in the Netherlands.
- Year Zero: A History of 1945. New York, NY: The Penguin Press. 2013. ISBN 978-1-59420-436-4.
- "The Man Who Got It Right", The New York Review of Books (2013)
- Theater of Cruelty: Art, Film, and the Shadows of War (2014) ISBN 978-1-59017-777-8
- — (July 20, 2015). "The Sensualist: What Makes 'The Tale of Genji' So Seductive". The Critics. Books. The New Yorker. Vol. 91, no. 20. pp. 64–71. (Note: Title in the online table of contents is "Why 'The Tale of Genji' Is Still Seductive".)
- Their Promised Land: My Grandparents in Love and War (2016)
- — (June 19, 2017). "Dance with the Dragon: Are the United States and China on a Collision Course?". The Critics. Books. The New Yorker. Vol. 93, no. 17. pp. 61–66. (Note: Online version is titled "Are China and the United States Headed for War?".)
- A Tokyo Romance. New York, NY: The Penguin Press. 2018. ISBN 978-1-101-98141-2.
- The Churchill Complex: The Rise and Fall of the Special Relationship and the End of the Anglo-American Order. United Kingdom: Atlantic Books. 2020. ISBN 978-1-78649-465-8.
- The Collaborators: Three Stories of Deception and Survival in World War II, Penguin Random House, 2023.
- — (October 16, 2023). "The Verdict". The Critics. Books. The New Yorker. pp. 71–76. (Note: Online version is titled "What the Tokyo Trial Reveals about Empire, Memory, and Judgment".)
- Spinoza: Freedom's Messiah, Yale University Press, 2024.
- Stay Alive: Berlin, 1939-1945, Penguin Press, 2026.
