= Indian Himalayan Region =

Region in northern India

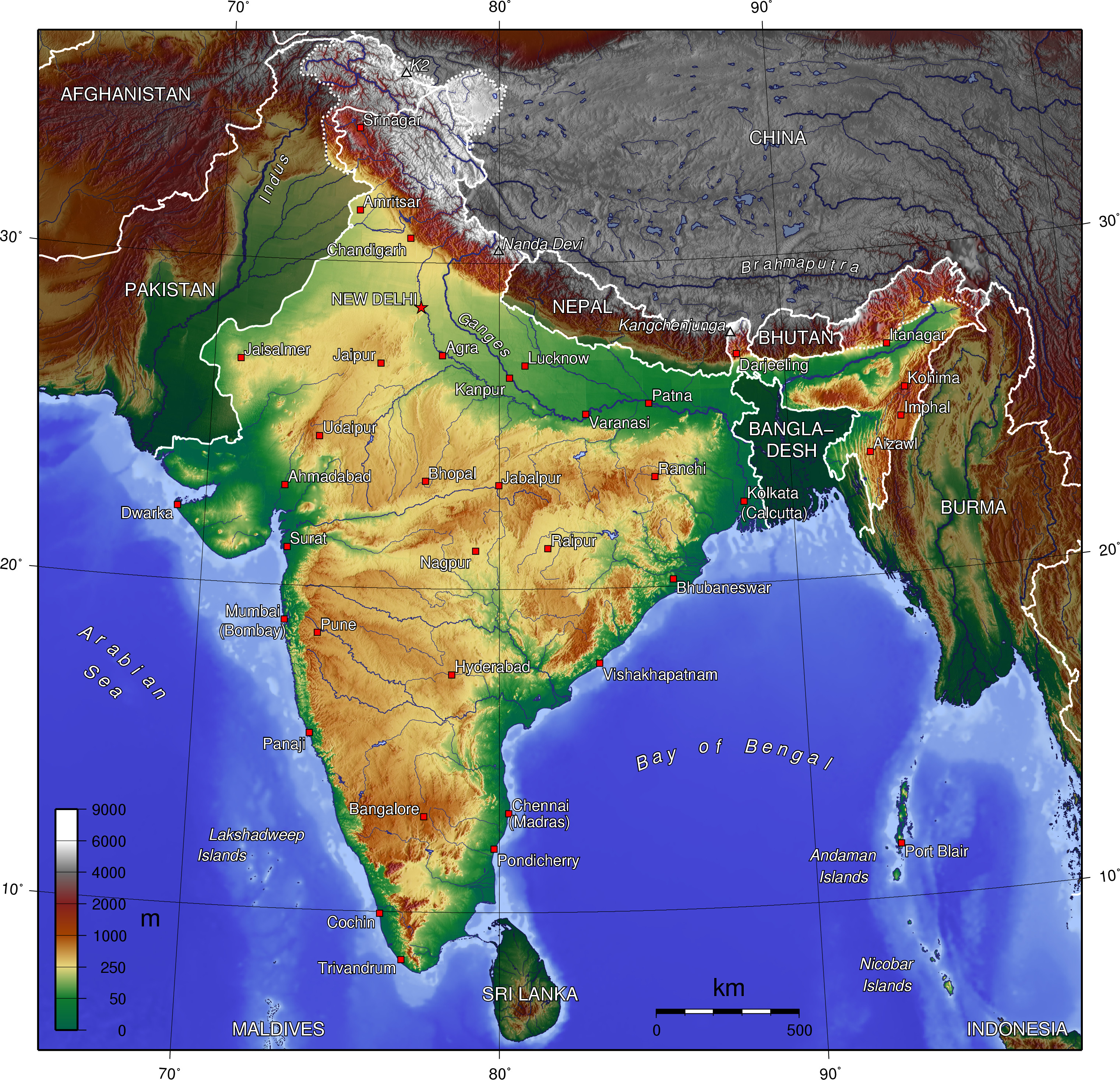
The parts of India marked in brown and white on this map lie in the IHR

The Indian Himalayan Region (abbreviated to IHR) is the section of the Himalayas within the Republic of India, spanning thirteen Indian states and union territories, namely Ladakh, Jammu and Kashmir, Himachal Pradesh, Uttarakhand, Sikkim, West Bengal, Arunachal Pradesh, Nagaland, Manipur, Mizoram, Tripura, Meghalaya, and Assam. The region is responsible for providing water to a large part of the Indian subcontinent and contains various flora and fauna.

Physiographically, the Himalayas start from the foothills of south (Sivaliks) and extend up to the Tibetan plateau of the north (Trans-Himalaya). Three major geographical entities, the Himadri (greater Himalaya), Himachal (lesser Himalaya) and the Sivaliks (outer Himalaya), extend almost uninterrupted throughout its length and are separated by major geological fault lines. Huge but older waterways like the Indus, Sutlej, Kali, Kosi and Brahmaputra cut steep gorges through the main Himalayan range to escape into the Great Plains, establishing their antecedence.

The northernmost range of mountains are the trans-Himalayan Karakoram Mountains that continue from India into Pakistan and China. To the south of the Karakoram Range lie the Zanskar and Ladakh ranges.

Some of the highest mountains on Earth are also found in the region. Many perennial, glacier-fed rivers flow from the Himalayas.

== Trans-Himalaya ==
Trans-Himalaya ranges in India include the Karakoram, Zanskar and Ladakh ranges that run through Ladakh and Himachal Pradesh. At the eastern end, some portion of the Kangri Karpo (a trans-Himalayan range) forms part of the northern boundary of Arunachal Pradesh with Tibet.

=== Karakoram Range ===
The Karakoram is a giant range, which geographically divides India and Central Asia. The range consists of high mountain peaks like K2, Rimo and Teram Kargri. The Korakoram Pass acts as the main connector between the markets of Yarkand, Leh and Kashgar.

=== Ladakh Range ===
To the north of the Leh lies the Ladakh Range which is an important part of the Trans-Himalayan range that merges with the Kailash Range in Tibet. Here, the important passes are the famous Khardung La, and Digar La, which lie to the northeast of Leh.

=== Zanskar Range ===
The Zanskar Range lies to the north of the main Himalaya. It acts as a backbone of Ladakh south of the Indus River, extending 250 kilometres (160 mi) from the Karcha (Suru) River near Kargil in the northwest to Tso Kar in the southeast. The range separates Indus Valley from the Zanskar Valley. It is divided from the main Himalaya by the Stod, Tsarap and Zanskar valleys. Some of the main passes are the Fatu La, on the Leh-Srinagar road, while the main trekking passes into the Zanskar valley are Singge La, the Cha Cha La and the Rubrang La.

== Middle Himalaya ==
=== Pir Panjal Range ===
To the south of the main Himalayas lies the lesser Himalayan Pir Panjal Range, with an average height of 5,000 metres (16,000 ft), in Jammu and Kashmir and Himachal Pradesh. The Kashmir valley is bounded by this range to its west and south. The resort town of Gulmarg is located on the northern slope of the range. Important passes include the Banihal pass, the Pir Panjal pass, the Sinthan pass and the Rohtang pass.

=== Dhauladhar Range ===
To the south of the Pir Panjal lies the Dhauladhar range. It lies to the north of the Kangra valley, from where it appears to rise almost vertical. It forms the water divide between the Ravi and Beas rivers. In the west it divides the Chenab valley and the Tawi Valley. It is located mostly in Himachal Pradesh.

== Sivalik Hills ==
The southern most range of the Himalayas are the Sivaliks. Sivaliks extend over a width of 10–50 km, and have an altitude varying between 900 m and 1100 m.

These ranges are called by different names in different regions:

- Jammu Hills in Jammu region
- Mishmi Hills in Arunachal Pradesh

These parts consist of thick gravel and alluvium.

The valley lying between the Lesser Himalayas and Shivalik ranges are called as Duns. Dehradun, Kalka Dun, Kiyarda Dun and Jammu Dun are some of the prominent Duns. It is the southern most region of the Himalayas.

== See also ==
- Himalayan Rim
- Mainland India
