= Zanskari =

Zanskari may refer to:

- Something of, from or related to Zanskar district, Zanskar River or Zanskar Range in Ladakh, India
  - Zangskari language, a Sino-Tibetan language of most of the people of Zanskar which is, apparently, closely related to Ladakhi
  - Zaniskari pony, a breed of pony found around Leh, Ladakh, India
