= Rangdum =

- Village
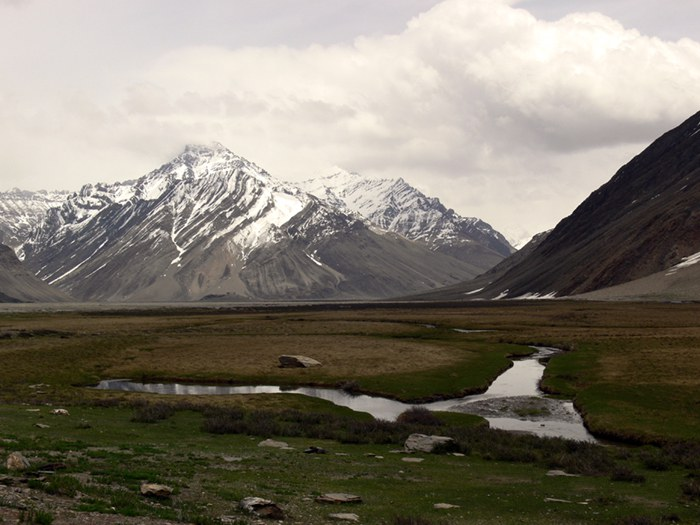
- Rangdum
- Interactive map of Rangdum
- Location in Ladakh, India Rangdum (India)
- Coordinates: 34°03′21″N 76°19′30″E
- Country: India
- Union territory: Ladakh
- District: Zanskar
- Tehsil: Phey
- Elevation: 3,657 m (11,998 ft)

Languages
  - Official: Hindi, English
  - Spoken: Ladakhi, Purgi, Urdu
- Time zone: UTC+5:30 (IST)

Rangdum is a village located in the Suru Valley of Zanskar district in the union territory of Ladakh in Northern India. On one side are the colourful hills while on the other side are rocky mountains and glaciers, notably Drang-drung.

It is located on the NH301 Kargil-Padum Highway.

== Geography ==
Rangdum is located midway between Kargil and Padum. It is about 100 kilometres (62 mi) from Kargil.

"Rangdum, with its gompa and the attendant village of Juliodok, is the last inhabited region in the Suru valley; it is also the destination of the nomadic herds people called Bakarwals, who trek up every year from the Himalayan foothills near Jammu, bringing their flocks of sheep and goats to grow fat on the rich summer growth of grass. From Rangdum the valley rises to 4400 metres and the Pensi-la, the gateway into Zanskar."

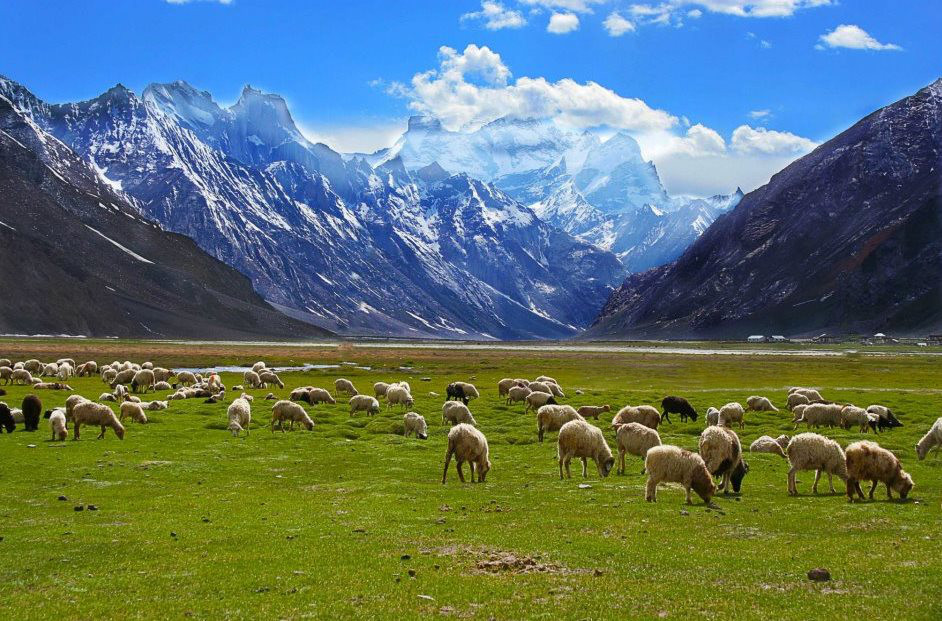
Sheep of Rangdum village

The country surrounding Rangdum Monastery is very bleak and crops sometimes cannot ripen in the brief summer. The locals depend on their flocks and supplies from lower down the Suru Valley or over the pass from Zanskar.

== Demography ==
The population of the Suru Valley as far as Parkachik are all Muslim. The valley is, however, practically uninhabited past Parkachik other than a couple of tiny settlements. The small villages of Yuldo and Julidok, at the end of the valley, are entirely Buddhist. The people are socially and culturally part of neighbouring Zanskar and support the 18th-century Rangdum Monastery belonging to the Gelugpa sect of Tibetan Buddhism.

== Tourism ==
Rangdum has a tourist bungalow, three tea-houses and, around 2 km from the village, a summer-only camp offering accommodation for tourists in bedded tents.

== See also ==
- Geography of Ladakh
- Tourism in Ladakh

== Bibliography ==
- Janet Rizvi. (1996). Ladakh: Crossroads of High Asia. Second Edition. Oxford University Press, Delhi. ISBN 0-19-564546-4.
- Schettler, Margaret & Rolf (1981). Kashmir, Ladakh & Zanskar. Lonely Planet Publications. South Yarra, Victoria, Australia. ISBN 0-908086-21-0.
