= National Highway 301 (India) =

National highway in India

National Highway 301
- Map of the National Highway in red

Route information
- Auxiliary route of NH 1
- Maintained by NHIDCL
- Length: 234 km (145 mi)

Major junctions
- North end: NH 1, Kargil
- South end: Zanskar

Location
- Country: India
- States: Ladakh

Highway system
- Roads in India; Expressways; National; State; Asian
← NH 1	→ NH 501

National Highway 301, commonly referred to as NH 301 is an intermediate-lane national highway in India. It is a spur road of National Highway 1. NH-301 traverses the union territory of Ladakh in India.

== Route ==
Route, declared a national highway in 2017, is as follows:

- Kargil city, junction with NH1 Srinagar-Leh Highway
- Suru Valley: Suru River flows south-to-north from Penzi La to Kargil
  - Sankoo
  - Panikhar
  - Julidok (Zulidok)
  - Rangdum
- Pensi La (Penzi La) pass
- Stod River (Doda River) sub-valley of Zanskar valley: Stod/Doda River flows north-to-south from Penzi La to Padum
  - Akshu
  - Hamiling
  - Phey (not to be confused with namesake Phey in Leh district)
  - Tungri, home of Tungri Monastery
  - Techa Khasar
  - Padum, junction with Nimmu–Padum–Darcha road where Stod/Doda river confluences with Tsarap River to form the Zanskar River

== Major intersections ==
- NH 1 northern terminal near Kargil.
- Nimmu–Padum–Darcha road (NPD Road) southern terminal at Padum town.

== Tunnel ==
There is demand to build Pensi La Tunnel for all-weather connectivity, as the Pensi La (Penzi La) pass remains open only during 6-7 months of the year, and gets cut off during winter snow. See also Tunnels in North West India.

== See also ==
- Various highways to Leh and Ladakh
- India–China Border Roads (ICBR)
- List of national highways in India
- List of national highways in India by state
