= Parkachik Glacier =

Glacier in Ladakh, India

- Location within Ladakh Location within India
- Type: Mountain glacier
- Location: Ladakh, India
- Coordinates: 34.05°N 75.98°E

Parachik Glacier is a mountain glacier in Kargil, Ladakh, India.

Parkachik Glacier, located at Parkachik, is a mass of ice moving slowly down the Nun-Kun slopes. This ice mass falls finally into the Suru River, providing views of the huge ice-fall.

Great slabs of ice periodically peel off the glacier's 300-foot high front wall. A suspension footbridge over the Suru River is there for the visitors to walk up to the glacier. Some mountaineers use this glacier to approach the difficult north face route to scale Mt Nun.

Camping areas are offered in the upper Suru Valley. Panikhar is a nearby place of attraction.

Parkachik can be approached from Kargil, which is 90 km north.
