= Northern South Asia =

Northern part of South Asia

- Population: ~500,000,000 (2022)
- Demonym: Northern South Asian
- Countries: Afghanistan; Bangladesh; Bhutan; India (North India); Nepal; Pakistan
- Languages: Most common first languages: Bengali; Hindi–Urdu; Nepali; Assamese
- Time zones: UTC+5:30; UTC+5:45; UTC+06:00
- Internet TLD: .in, .pk, .np, .bt
- Calling code: Zone 8 & 9
- Religions: Hinduism, Islam, Christianity, Buddhism, Irreligion, Tribal, Jainism, Sikhism, Judaism Zoroastrianism
- Ethnic groups: Indo-Aryan, Iranian, Dravidian, Tibeto-Burman, Munda, Khasi
- Historical names: Hindustan, Aryavarta

Northern South Asia is a geographical area in South Asia, and includes the country of Afghanistan, the Himalayas, parts of the Tibetan Plateau and the northern region of the Indian subcontinent. The Indo-Gangetic Plain forms the dominant feature. Depending on definition, it covers some or all of the countries of Afghanistan, Bhutan, Nepal and India (specifically North India), and Pakistan. Ethnolinguistically, northern South Asia is predominantly Indo-Aryan, along with Iranic populations in Afghanistan and Pakistan's Balochistan, and Khyber Pakhtunkhwa regions and diverse linguistic communities near the Himalayas. Until the Partition of India in 1947, northern South Asia had a significant degree of cultural and political unity; the 1947 partition, along with the 1971 secession of Bangladesh from Pakistan, resulted in significant inter-migration in the region. Since the end of colonial rule in the region, some of its borders have been heavily contested (primarily between India and its neighbours Pakistan and China), resulting in a significant military presence in the region and negative consequences for local peoples. This tension in the region has also contributed to difficulties in sharing river waters among Northern South Asian countries; climate change is projected to contribute significantly to this and other problems.

Dominated by the Indo-Gangetic Plain, the region is home to about half a billion people and is the poorest region of the subcontinent.

== History ==
=== Ancient era ===
The sixteen "mahajanapada" dynasties flourished in Northern South Asia starting in the sixth century BC, and the region was known as Aryavarta. They were conquered by the Maurya Empire starting in the late fourth century BC. This was then replaced by a number of competing polities that fought over territory until the development of robust states starting in the fourth century AD. Throughout the first millennium AD, regional political dynasties emerged that formed alliances and controlled vast swathes of the region.

From the tenth century CE until about the eighteenth, it was invaded and ruled by Muslims from Afghanistan, Persia and Central Asia. Persian became the language of the courts, and influenced vernacular languages; this is when Hindi and Urdu, two prominent modern-day standards in South Asia, first started to emerge from the Hindustani language.

=== Modern era ===
After the 1947 partition, religious nationalism led to a starker divide between Hindi and Urdu, which were respectively modified to have a greater share of their vocabularies come from Sanskrit and Perso-Arabic sources.

== Social issues ==
It has more gender inequality and constrictions on women's rights than other parts of South Asia.

== See also ==
- North India
- North Bengal
- Eastern South Asia
- Southern South Asia
- Himalayan Rim
  - Indian Himalayan Region
