= Zanskar Range =

Mountain range in Ladakh

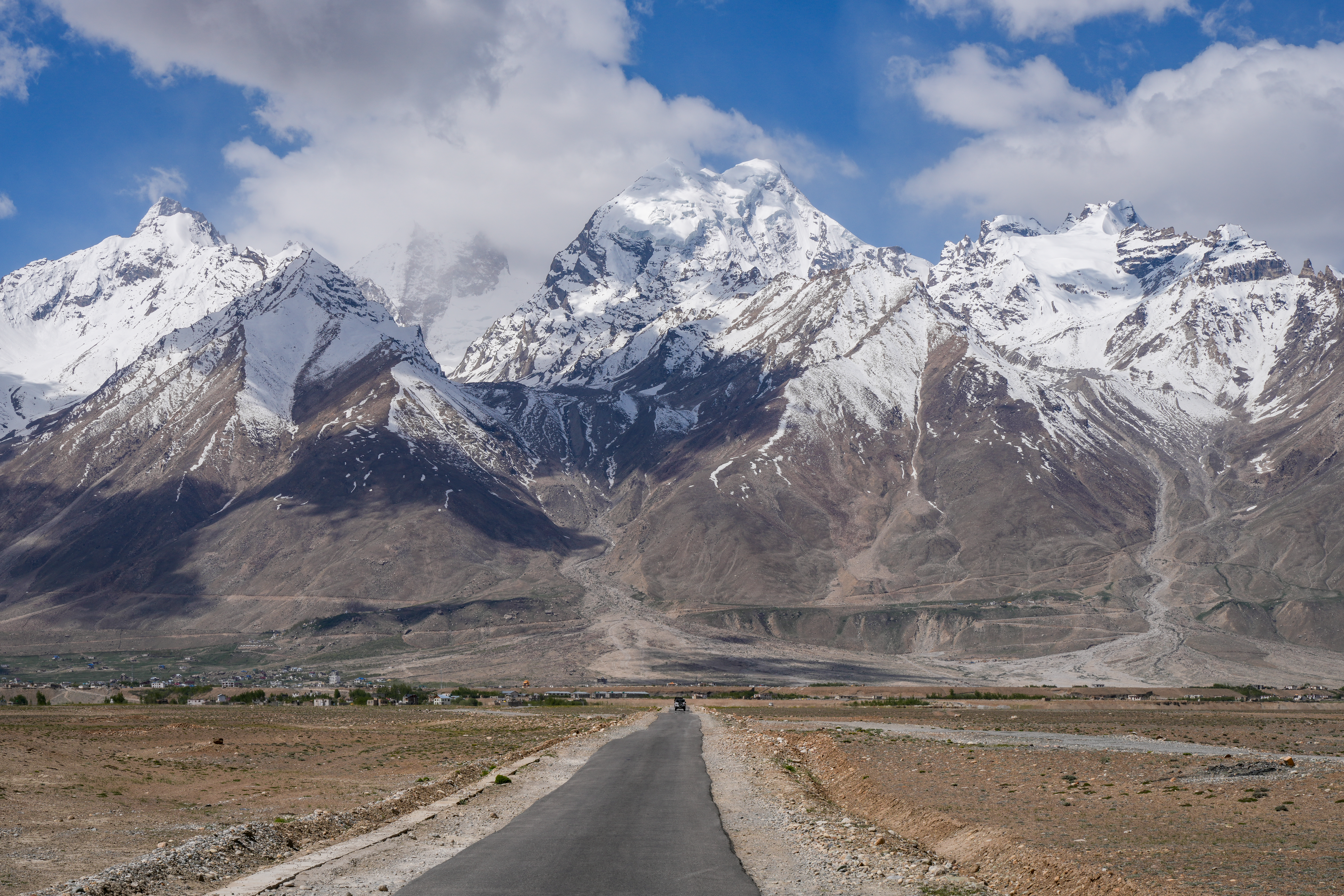
- Zanskar mountains towering over road to Padum

Dimensions
- Length: 250 km (160 mi)

Naming
- Native name: ཟངས་དཀར་ (Zangskari)

Geography
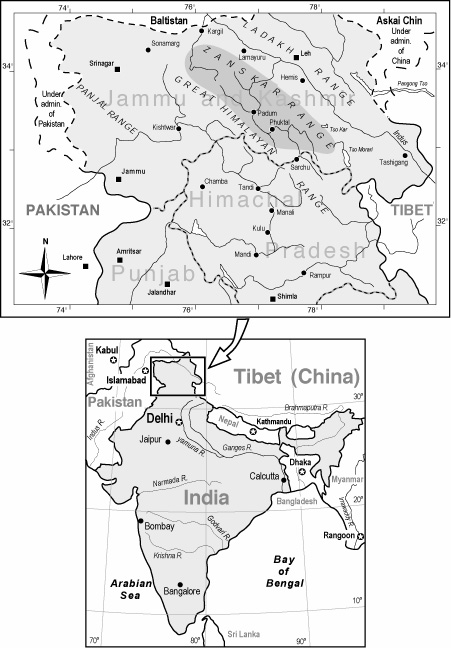
- Location: Zanskar, Ladakh, India
- Range coordinates: 33°48′N 77°12′E
- Parent range: Tethys Himalaya

The Zanskar Range (locally Zahar or Zangskar ) is a mountain range in northern India spanning Ladakh and Himachal Pradesh that separates the Zanskar valley from the Indus valley. The range lies between and runs parallel to the Great Himalayas to the southwest and the Ladakh Range to the northeast. Geologically, the Zanskar Range is part of the Tethys Himalaya. There are a number of peaks higher than 6,500 m (21,300 ft). Its eastern part is known as Rupshu.

== Geography ==
The Zanskar range spans 250 kilometres (160 mi) from the Karcha (Suru) River near Kargil in the northwest to Tso Kar in the southeast. The range separates Indus Valley from the Zanskar Valley.

The range is divided from the main Himalaya by the Stod, Tsarap and Zanskar Valleys. The Zanskar River cuts a deep gorge into the range.

Passes in the range include Fotu La (on the Leh-Srinagar road), Wakha La, Kanji La, Charchar La, Ruberang La, and Taglang La.

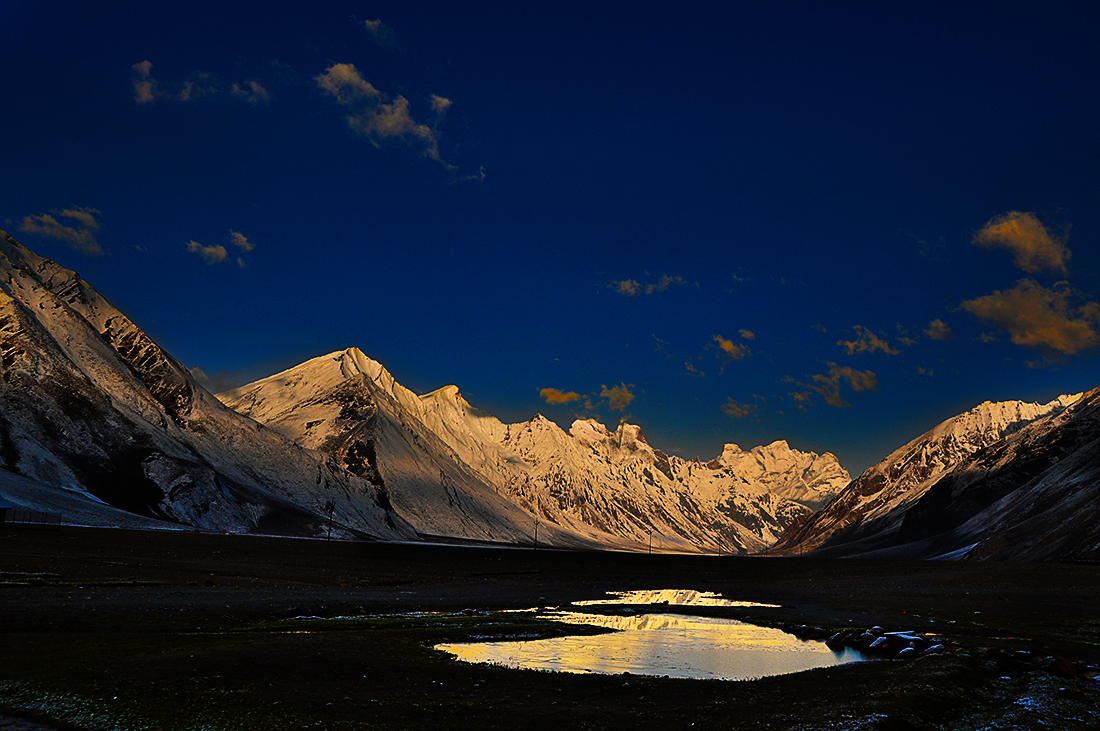
Zanskar Range, sunrise at Rangdum

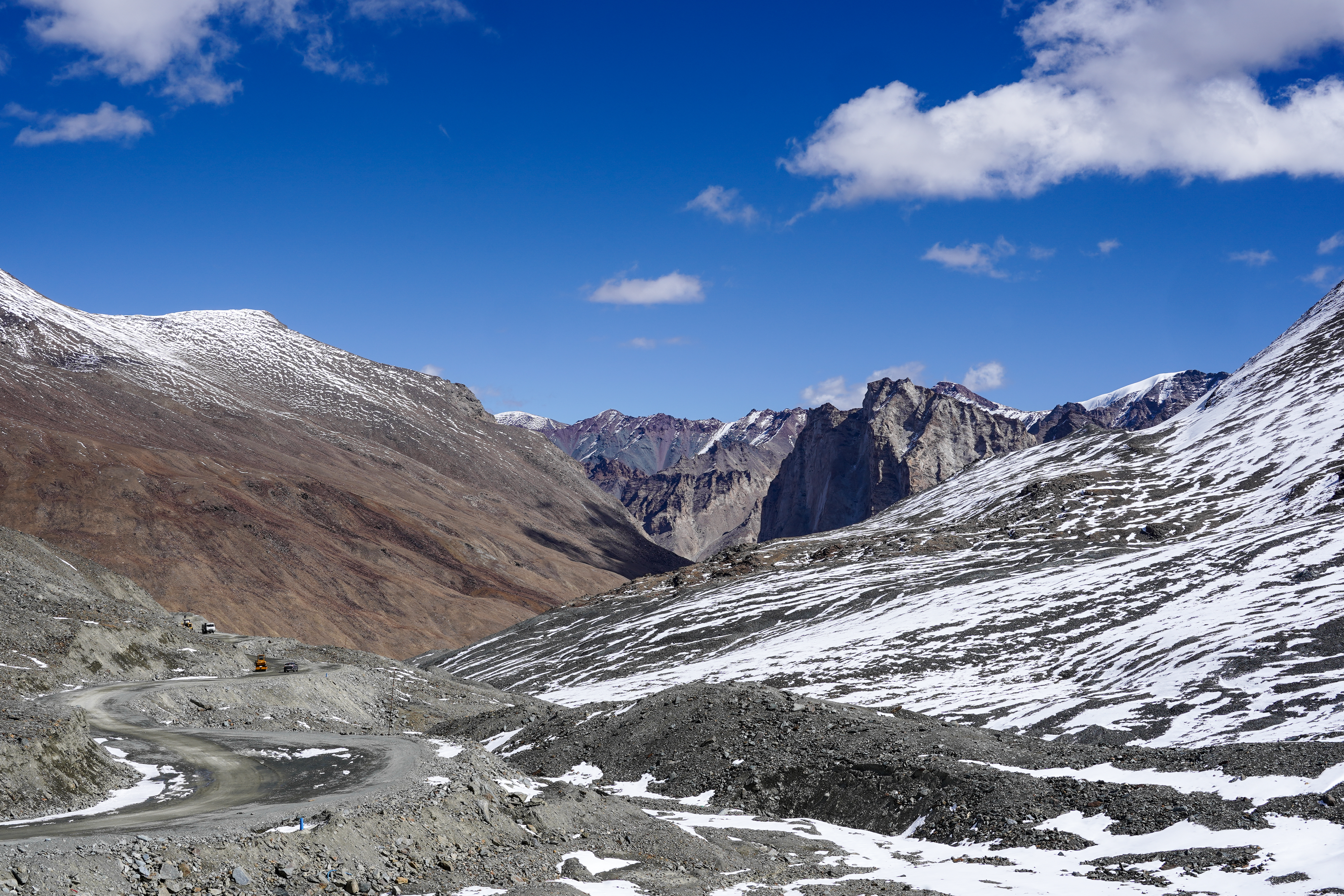
Shingo La, view north towards Zanskar

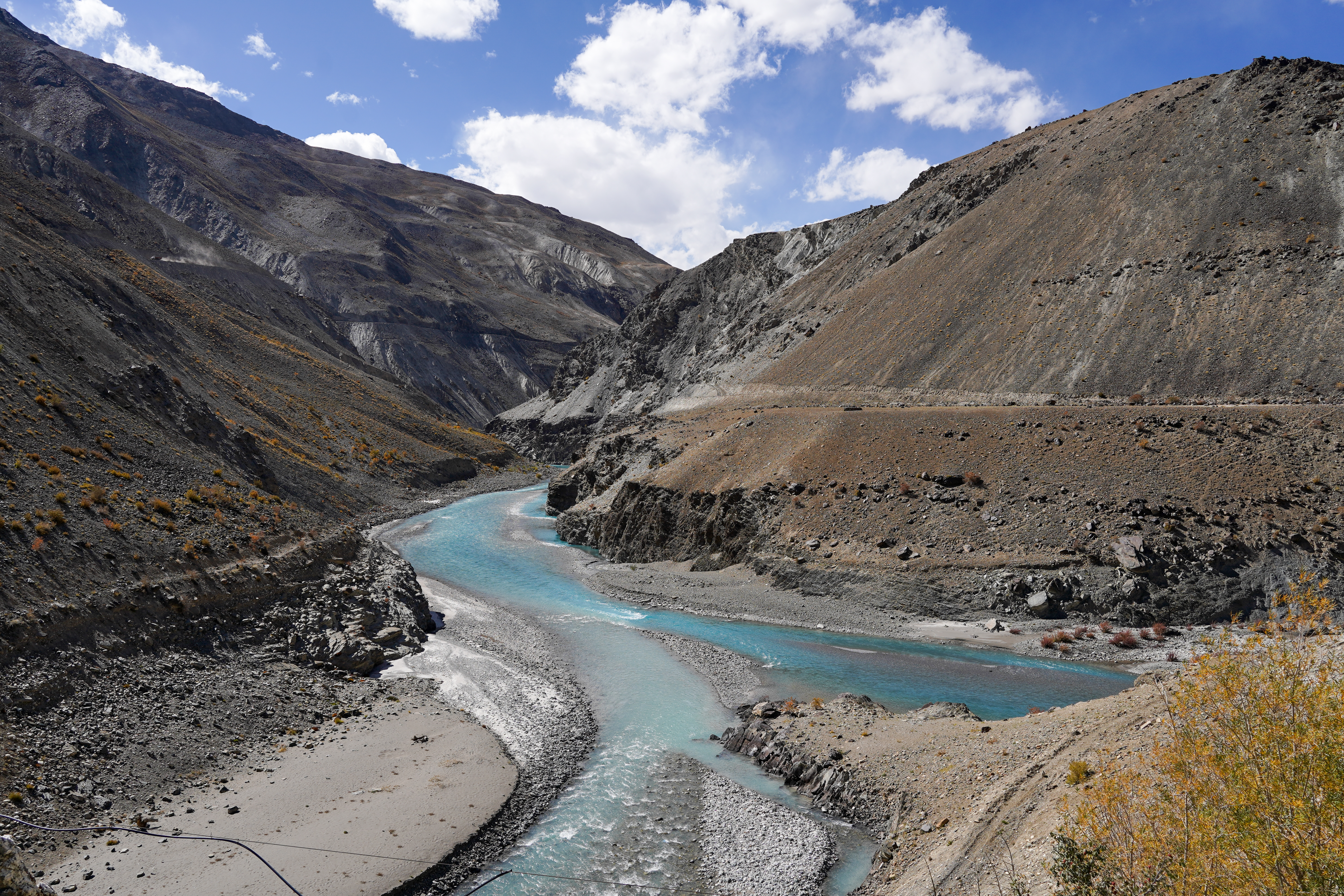
Confluence of the Kargiakh and Tsarap

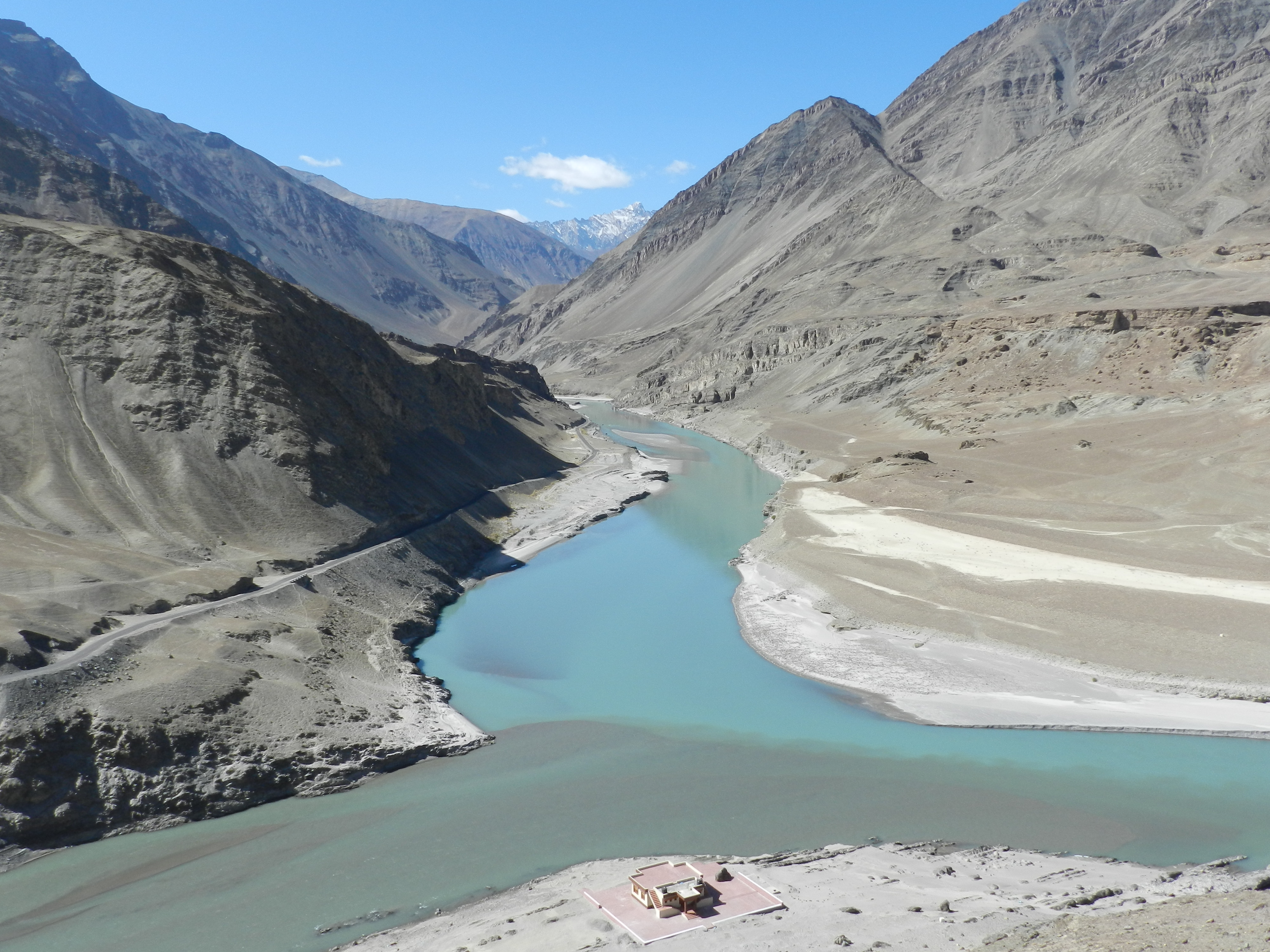
Zanskar River meeting the Indus

== See also ==
- Indian Himalayas
