= Himalayan states =

Group of countries straddling the Himalayas

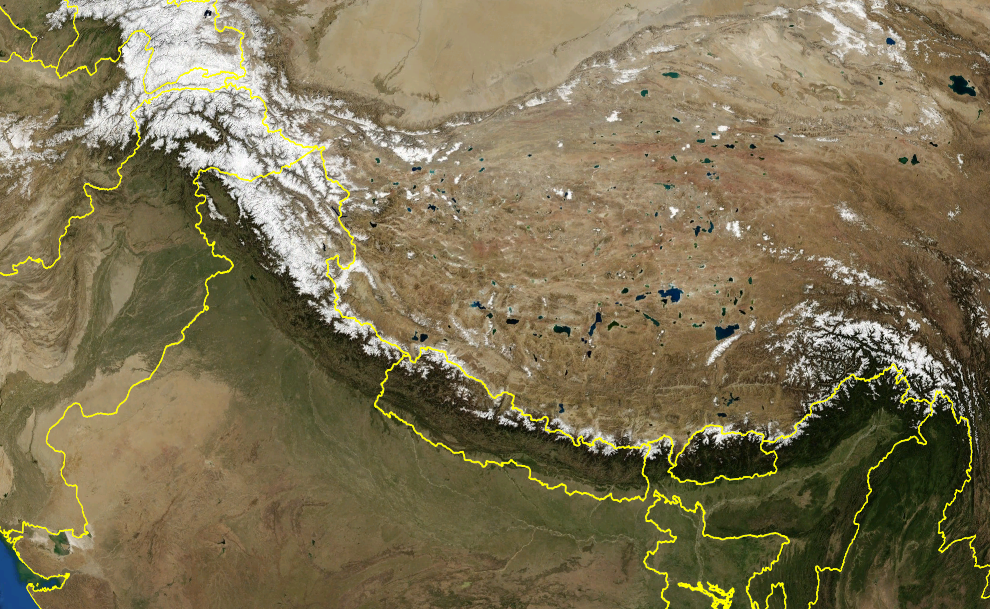
- Satellite imagery of the Himalayas, with state borders overlaid
- Countries: Bhutan; China; India; Nepal; Pakistan sometimes included: Afghanistan; Myanmar

The term Himalayan states is used to group countries that straddle the Himalayas. It primarily denotes Bhutan, China, India, Nepal, and Pakistan; some definitions also include Afghanistan and Myanmar. Two countries—Bhutan and Nepal—are located almost entirely within the mountain range, which also covers southern Tibet, the Indian Himalayan Region, and northern Pakistan.

The inhabitants of this region are mostly speakers of the Indo-Aryan languages and the Tibeto-Burman languages.

Some of the world's major transboundary rivers originate in the territory of the Himalayan states, including the Brahmaputra, the Ganges, the Indus, and the Irrawaddy.

== See also ==
- Alpine states
- Baltic states
- Andean states
