= Drang-Drung Glacier =

Glacier in India

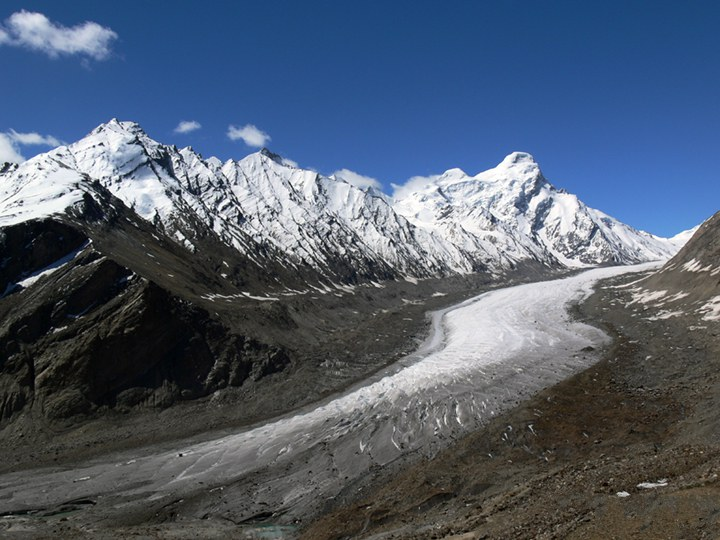
- Drang-Drung Glacier

- Location within Ladakh Location within India
- Interactive map of Drang-Drung Glacier
- Type: Mountain glacier
- Location: Himalaya Range, Zanskar Range, Pensi La, Ladakh
- Coordinates: 33°45′19″N 76°18′04″E
- Length: 23 km (14 mi)

The Drang-Drung Glacier (also called Durung Drung Glacier) is a mountain glacier near the Pensi La pass on the Kargil-Zanskar Road in the Kargil district of Ladakh in India.

The Drang-Drung Glacier is likely to be the largest glacier in Ladakh after the Siachen Glacier in the Karakoram Range, with a maximum length of 23 km (14 mi) at an average elevation of 4,780 m (15,680 ft; 2.97 mi). The glacier lies in the northeastern Himalayan Range known as the Zanskar Range, 142 km (88 mi) south of Kargil and 331 km (206 mi) east of Srinagar, the capital of Jammu and Kashmir.

The Drang-Drung Glacier is a long river of ice and snow, a source of the Stod River, a tributary of the Zanskar River, itself a tributary of the Indus River. Doda Peak with an elevation of 6,550 m (21,490 ft; 4.07 mi) rises from the glacier.

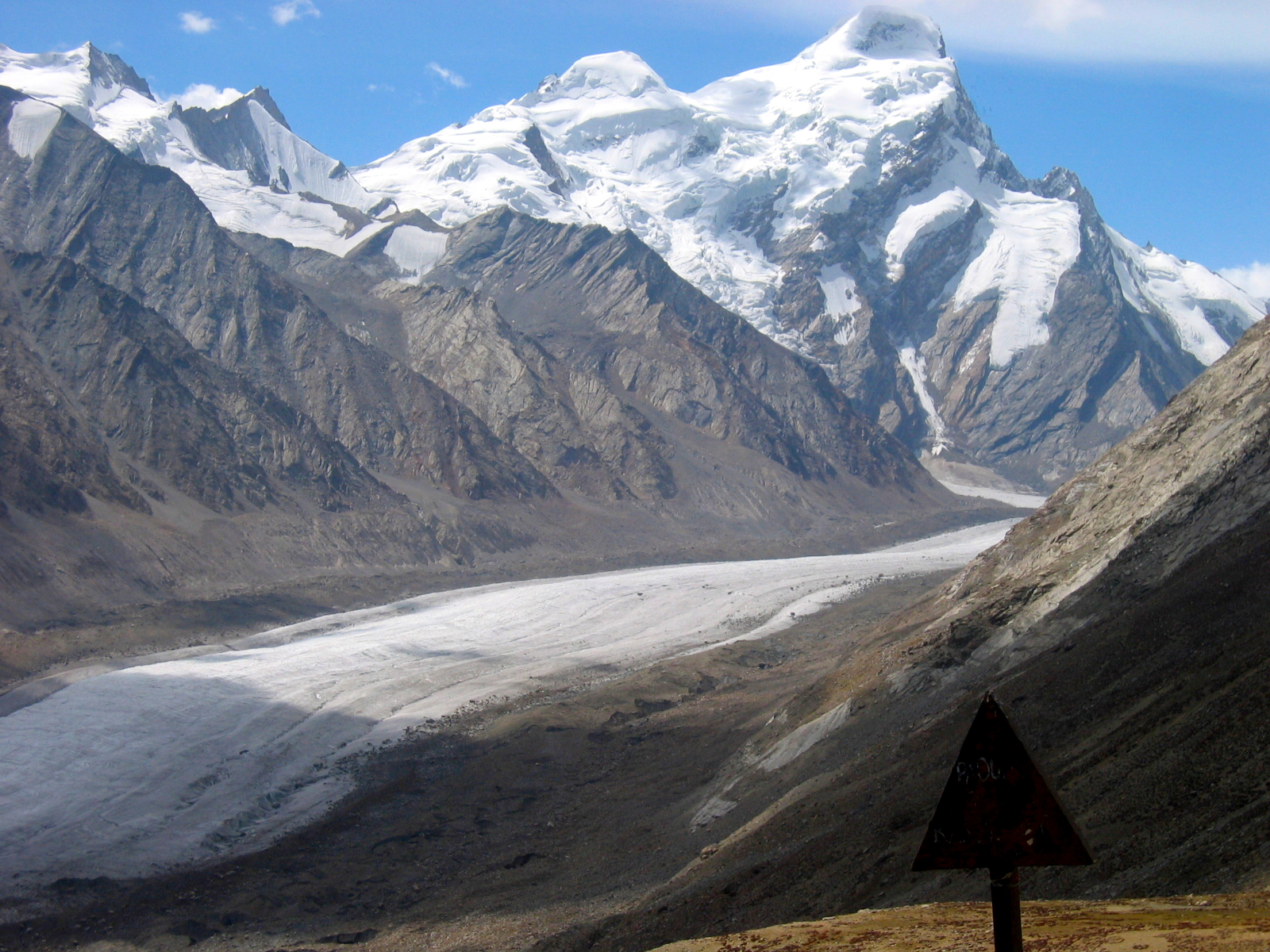
Drang Drung Glacier seen from Pensi La

== Access ==
The Drang-Drung Glacier is accessible from Srinagar or Srinagar Airport in two days, 331 km (206 mi) by car or bus along NH 1D, which connects Srinagar and Leh through the towns of Ganderbal, Kangan, Sonamarg, and Dras. Kargil town is at the half-way point. From Kargil the glacier lies on the right side of Kargil-Zanaskar Road which passes through a gorge of the Suru River and below two mountain peaks, Nun and Kun. After crossing the Pensi La mountain pass a trek of one day from the road leads to the head of Drang-Drung glacier. The road is only open to traffic from May–September due to heavy snowfall at Zojila and Pensi La passes, and the best time to visit is July to August.
