= Suru Valley =

Valley in Ladakh, India

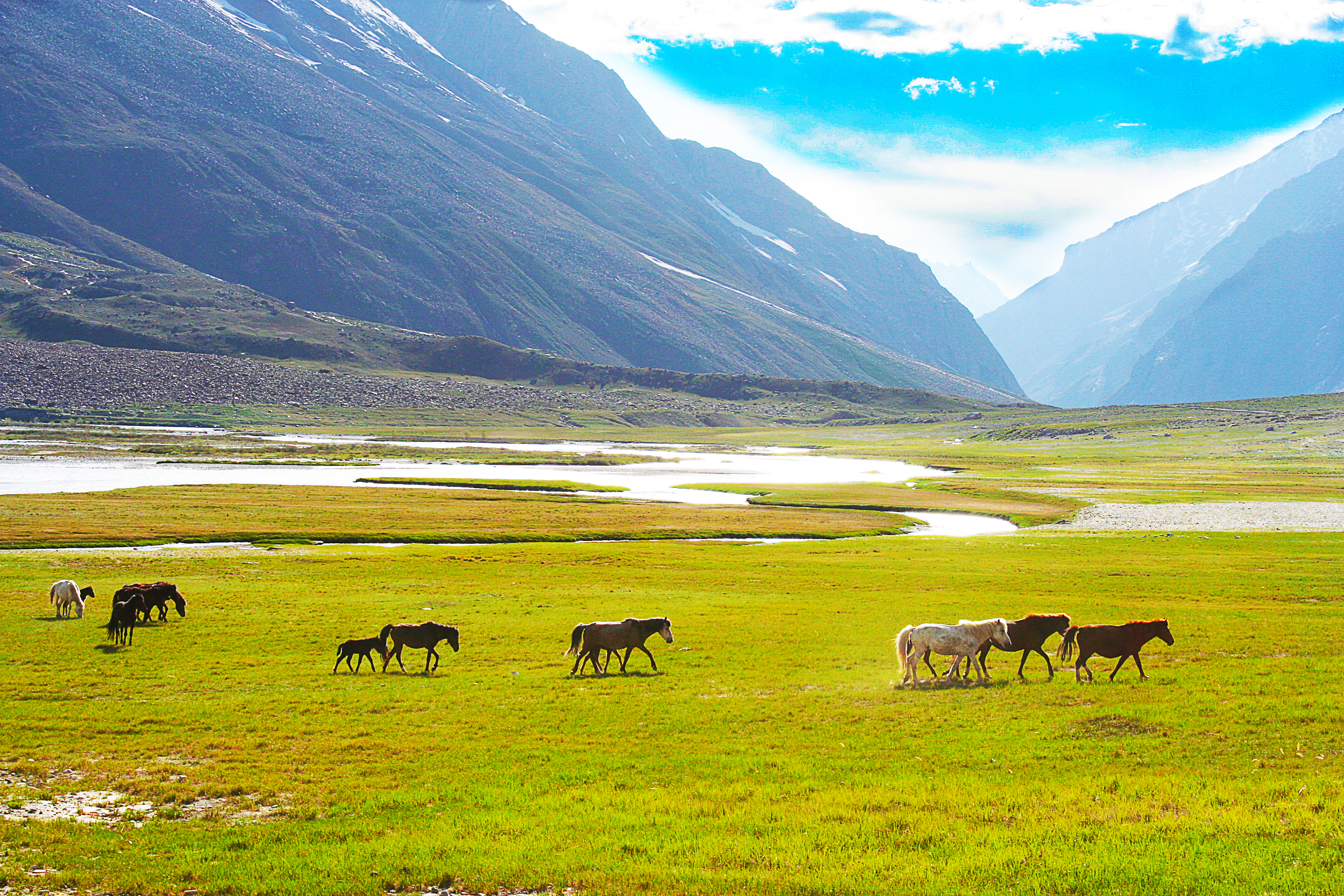
Suru Valley

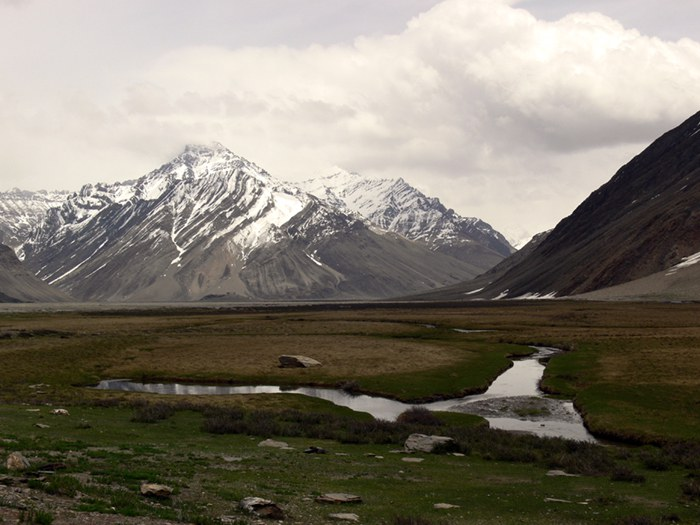
The upper Suru Valley near Rangdum.

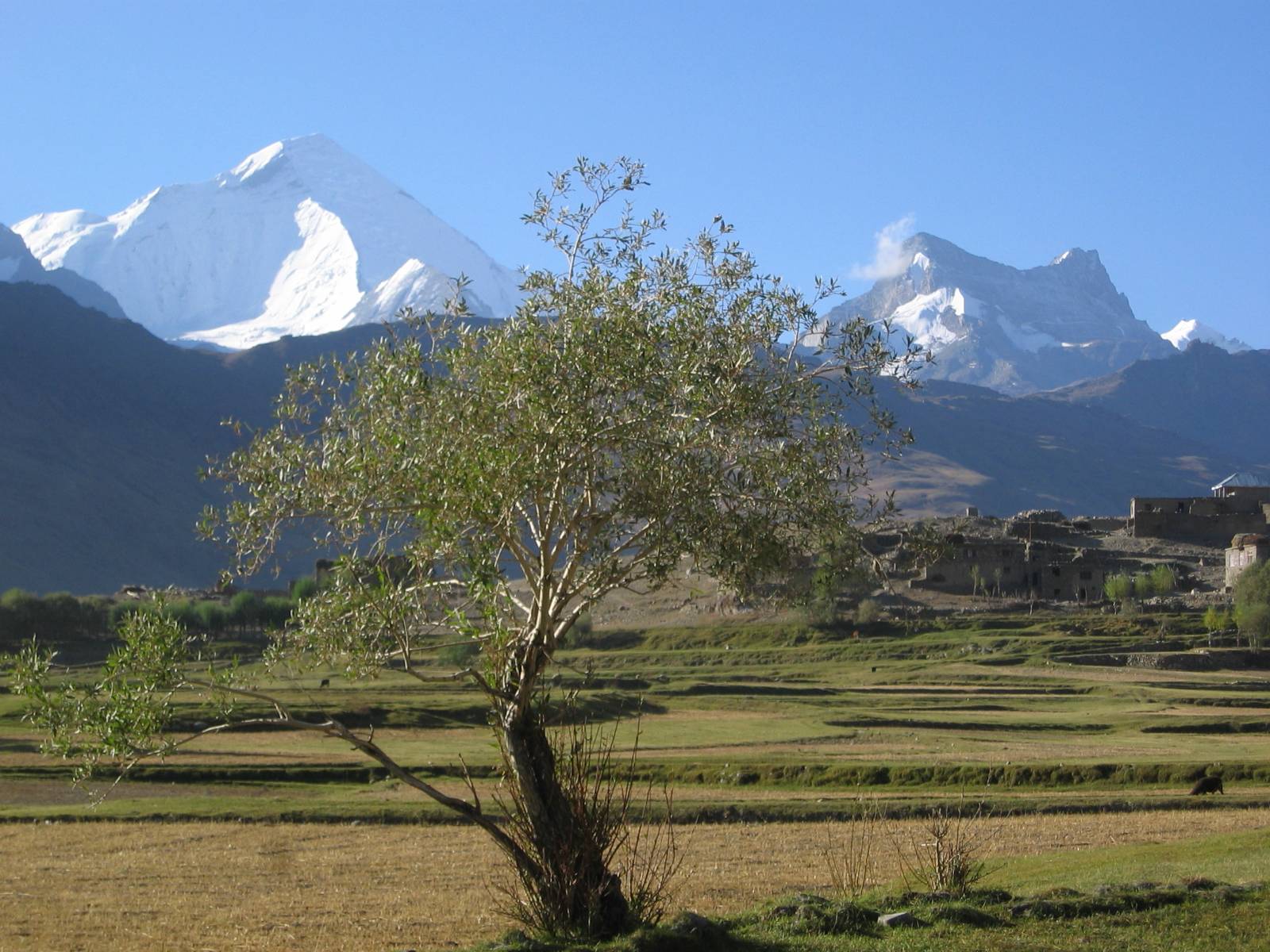
The landscape of the lower Suru Valley, looking south towards Nun Kun. As viewed from between Sanku and Panikhar.

The Suru Valley is a valley in the Sankoo district in the Union Territory of Ladakh, India. It is drained by the Suru River, a tributary of the Indus River. The valley's most significant town is Sankoo. Horses, yaks and other animals can be found in the valley. In winter Suru Valley experiences heavy snowfall and avalanches. The literacy rate of Suru Valley is very low as compared to other parts of Ladakh.

NH301 Padum-Pensi La-Kargil Highway runs along the Stod River (Doda River) Valley from Padum in south to Pensi La in north. From north of Pensi La (Penzi La), the highway runs further north through Suru Valley to Kargil town.

== History ==
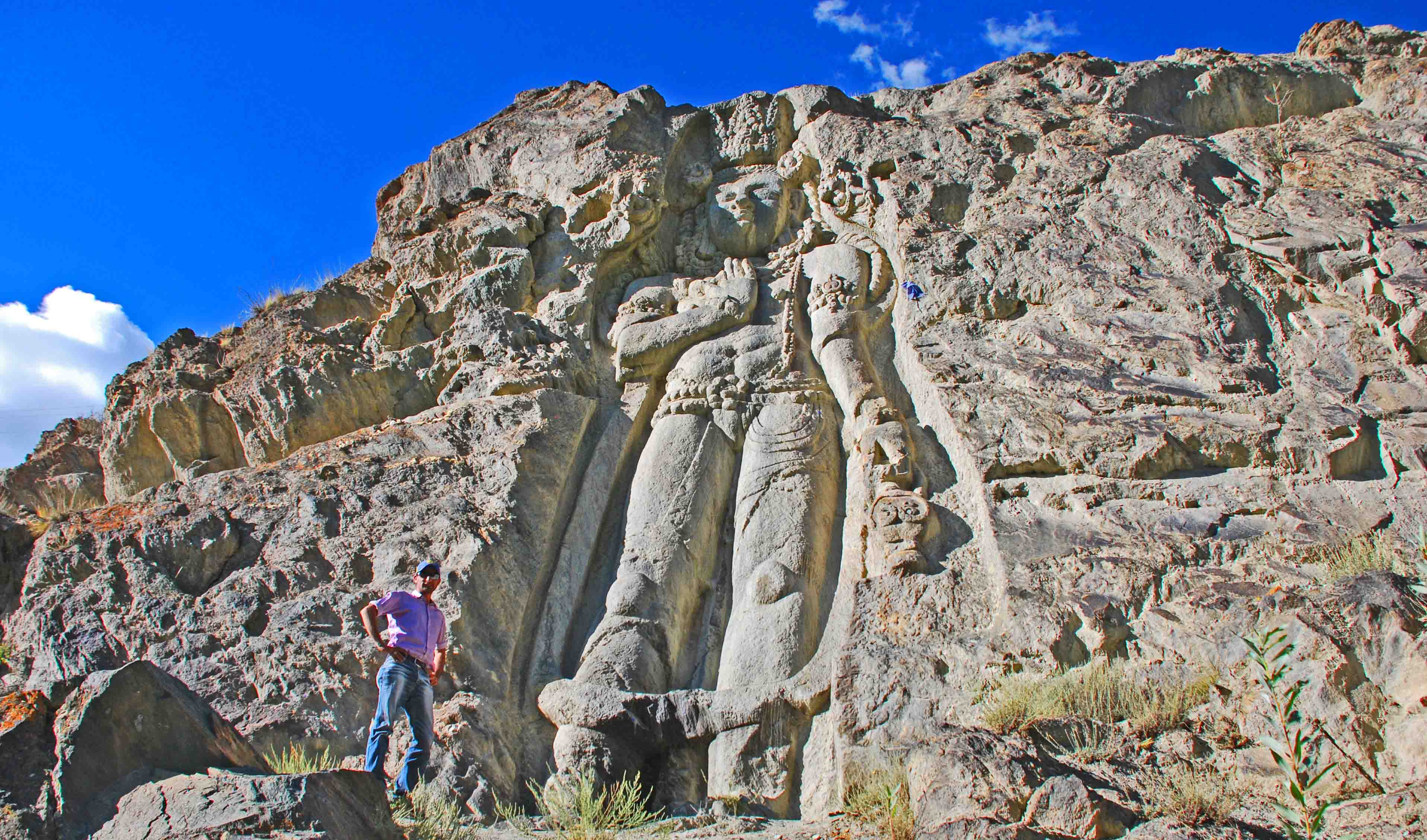
Giant Maitreya rock carving at Karpokhar near Kartse

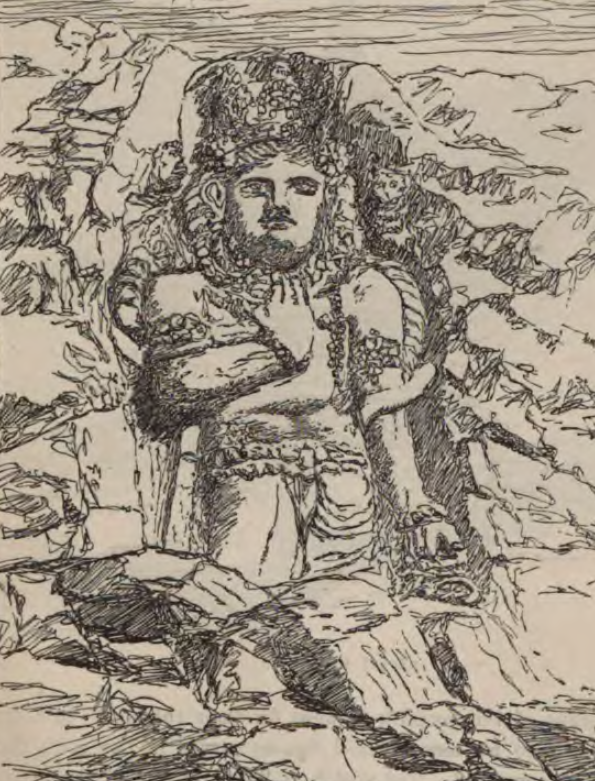
Sketch of the Maitreya carving by Frederic Drew

The Suru Valley was historically ruled from Kartse (Wylie: dkar rtse, 34.2672°N 76.0018°E), a fort in a branch valley near Sankoo. An inscription names its ruler as Tri-gyal (Wylie: k'ri rgyal). Tibetologist A. H. Francke believes that the dynasty of Tri-gyals might have been in existence prior to the formation of the Maryul kingdom (in modern Ladakh) in the 10th century. However, there is no mention of it in Ladakh Chronicles. When the Maryul kingdom was formed under Lhachen Palgyigon, its extent ran up to the Zoji La pass. (Note: This would imply that Wakha Rong and Dras valleys (on the route between Zoji La and upper Ladakh) were under Ladakhi control, but Suru, being a side valley of the main route, was treated separately. It was not considered part of "Purig" until the modern period.)

The principality of Kartse apparently controlled the entire western Ladakh, from Mulbekh and Wanla in the east to Dras in the west, even though the extent of territory would have varied with time. The Tri-gyals were Buddhist and adopted the religion from Kashmir in ancient times. They commissioned a giant Maitreya rock carving in the vicinity of Kartse, and others at Mulbekh and possibly Apati.

The conversion of Kashmir to Islam in the 14th century had implications for western Ladakh. Baltistan was invaded during the reign of Sultan Sikandar (r. 1394–1416), and the influence of Islam spread there. Zain-ul-Abidin (r. 1418–1470) raided Ladakh, Guge and Purang (in western Tibet) and collected tribute. The Tri-gyal of Kartse is said to have become his vassal and assisted in the invasions.

Islam was introduced into the area from the 16th century onward by preachers traveling through Baltistan. Around the 16th century, a Muslim chieftaincy connected to Skardu appeared in Purig, first at Sod northeast of Kargil, then with a branch at Chiktan northeast of Namika La. During the invasion of Ladakh by Mirza Haidar Dughlat in 1532, Sod and Chiktan appear to have submitted, but not Kartse. Joint raids were conducted on Kartse but they failed. The chief or commander of Suru, named "Baghan", is also said to have been killed during one of the raids. (Note: Baghan is described as "a Chui of the provinces of Tibet", which is taken to mean "headman" by Petech.)

A succession of Ladakhi kings from Tashi Namgyal (r. 1555–1575) onwards attempted to make forays into Purig, but Kartse is not mentioned by name until the time of Deldan Namgyal (r. 1642–1680). (Note: Francke speculates that the two prominent chiefs of Purig at the time of Jamyang Namgyal were those of Chiktan and Kartse, and that both of them had accepted Islam. Petech has not accepted the supposition.) Deldan Namgyal, having made peace with Lhasa and the Mughal Empire in Kashmir in his early years, sent a comprehensive invasion force to Purig under general Shakya Gyatso. Chiktan, Pashkum, Sod and Kartse were all conquered. Tri Sultan of Kartse, (Note: The change of title from "Tri-gyal" to "Tri Sultan" indicates conversion to Islam having taken place. Local tradition informs us that the father of this ruler first converted to Islam.) who appears to have been an independent king at that time, was taken prisoner. Kashmir sent a small force to check the Ladakhis, but it was repulsed. After the Tibet–Ladakh–Mughal War (1679–1683), Ladakh was apparently compelled to return the Purig principalities to their former independence.

In the early 18th century, the Suru valley became part of the chiefdom of Purig. According to local traditions, around the year 1720, Mohammed Thi Sultan, who did not have an heir, adopted the Ladakhi ruler Nyima Namgyal as his son. After Nyima Namgyal's abdication, Purig was assigned to his second son Tashi Namgyal to rule independently. Five noble familites of Purig are said to have paid tributes to Tashi Namgyal at Mulbekh. (Note: Judged by the later encounters of Zorawar Singh in 1834, these noble families are likely to have been those of Kartse, Sod, Pashkum, Chiktan and possibly Dras.) After Tashi Namgyal, Purig reverted as an integral part of Ladakh.

The Dogras conquered the entire area by 1847 and it proved to be disastrous for the natives. The Dogras were especially harsh to Muslims (including the nobles) in the area, and they attempted to rebel against the Dogras. The current line of control runs near modern Kargil.

== People ==
Religion in Sanku tehsil (2011)
1. Islam (99.9%)
2. Hinduism (0.00%)
3. Buddhism (0.07%)
4. Christianity (0.00%)
5. Sikhism (0.00%)
6. Others (0.00%)
7. Not stated (0.00%)

The Suru valley is inhabited 25,000 by Purgi people of Tibetan descent. The majority of the population are followers of Shia Islam. According to local tradition, the populace was converted from Tibetan Buddhism during the rule of Thi-Namgyal, chief of Kartse and his Balti wife Thi Lha Khatun, who brought Muslim scholars to the area, which ultimately led to many conversions. Beyond Parkachik, the valley is practically uninhabited other than a couple of tiny settlements (Yuldo and Julidok) that make up Rangdum. People here are socially and culturally part of neighbouring Buddhist Zanskar and support the 18th century Rangdum Monastery belonging to the Gelugpa sect of Tibetan Buddhism. About 25 km south of Rangdum Monastery, the 4,400 m (14,436 ft) Pensi La (pass) leads into Zanskar

=== Religion ===
Almost the entire population of Suru valley are adherents of Shia Islam. A small fraction of the population also follows the Sunni branch of Islam, mostly concentrated in the villages of Panikhar and Prantee. The few other religious demographics shown in the census are mostly migrant workers from other parts of India.

=== Languages ===
The Purgi language is the predominant language in the Suru Valley, spoken by about 95 percent of the people in the Sankoo Tehsil.

== Landscape and agriculture ==
The lower part of the valley, at altitudes below 3,000 metres (9,843 ft), is one of the most agriculturally productive parts of Ladakh with two crops a year being harvested, watered by the run-off from the very heavy winter snowfalls, and even plantations of willow and poplar trees making it a relatively lush and very attractive area, but around Rangdum the landscapes are stark, flat moorlands ringed by arid crags. The spiky white topped mountain peaks of the Nun-Kun massif, topping 7000 m, are visible from several places in the valley.

== Tourism ==
Despite considerable potential, tourism activity is very limited in the valley with most visitors rushing through to Padum and Zanskar. There are few facilities for visitors but Ladakh UT Tourism does have basic tourist bungalows in several of the villages. and there's a summer tent-camp in Rangdum. Tangole village is a possible starting point for mountaineering expeditions up Nun Kun.

== See also ==
- Geography of Ladakh
- Tourism in Ladakh

== Bibliography ==
- Devers, Quentin (2020), "Buddhism before the First Diffusion? The case of Tangol, Dras, Phikhar and Sani-Tarungtse in Purig and Zanskar (Ladakh)", Études Mongoles & Sibériennes, Centrasiatiques & Tibétaines, 51 (51), doi:10.4000/emscat.4226, S2CID 230579183
- Francke, Rev. A. H. (1907), A History of Western Tibet, S. W. Partridge & Co – via archive.org
- Grist, Ncola (1995), "The History of Islam in Suru", in Henry Osmaston; Philip Denwood (eds.), Recent Research on Ladakh 4 & 5: Proceedings of the Fourth and Fifth International Colloquia on Ladakh, Motilal Banarsidass Publ., pp. 175–, ISBN 978-81-208-1404-2
- Nicola Grist (1998), Local Politics in Suru Valley of Northern India (PhD Thesis)
- Grist, Nicola (2005), "The History of Islam in Suru", in Bray, John (ed.), Ladakhi Histories: Local and Regional Perspectives, Brill's Tibetan Studies Library, vol. 9, Brill Publishers, pp. 175–, ISBN 9789004145511
- Grist, Nicola (2008). "Urbanisation in Kargil and its Effects in the Suru Valley". In Martijn van Beek; Fernanda Pirie (eds.). Modern Ladakh: Anthropological Perspectives on Continuity and Change. BRILL. ISBN 978-90-474-4334-6.
- Gupta, Radhika (2013). "Allegiance and Alienation: Border Dynamics in Kargil". In David N. Gellner (ed.). Borderland Lives in Northern South Asia. Duke University Press. pp. 47–71. ISBN 978-0-8223-7730-6.
- Gupta, Riya (2019). "Pre-modern cosmopolitanism: a challenge to Ladakh's 'Tibetanness'". In Sutapa Dutta; Nilanjana Mukherjee (eds.). Mapping India: Transitions and Transformations, 18th–19th Century. Taylor & Francis. ISBN 978-1-00-018640-6.
- Handa, O. C. (2001), Buddhist Western Himalaya: A politico-religious history, Indus Publishing, ISBN 978-81-7387-124-5
- Howard, Neil (1997), "What happened between 1450 and 1550 AD? and other questions from the history of Ladakh", in Henry Osmaston; Nawang Tsering; International Association for Ladakh Studies (eds.), Recent Research on Ladakh 6: Proceedings of the Sixth International Colloquium on Ladakh, Leh 1993, Motilal Banarsidass Publ., pp. 121–138, ISBN 978-81-208-1432-5
- Petech, Luciano (1977), The Kingdom of Ladakh, c. 950–1842 A.D., Instituto Italiano Per il Medio ed Estremo Oriente – via archive.org
- Rizvi, Janet (1996), Ladakh: Crossroads of High Asia (Second ed.), Oxford University Press, ISBN 978-0-19-564016-8 – via archive.org
  - Janet Rizvi. (1996). Ladakh: Crossroads of High Asia. Second Edition. Oxford University Press, Delhi. ISBN 0-19-564546-4.
- Schwieger, Peter (1997), "Kathog Rigzin Tsewang Norbu's (Kah-thog-rig-'dzin Tshe-dbang-nor-bu) diplomatic mission to Ladakh in the 18th century", in Henry Osmaston; Nawang Tsering (eds.), Recent Research on Ladakh 6: Proceedings of the Sixth International Colloquium on Ladakh, Leh 1993, Motilal Banarsidass Publ., pp. 219–, ISBN 978-81-208-1432-5
