= Himalayan Rim =

Asian region surrounding Himalayas

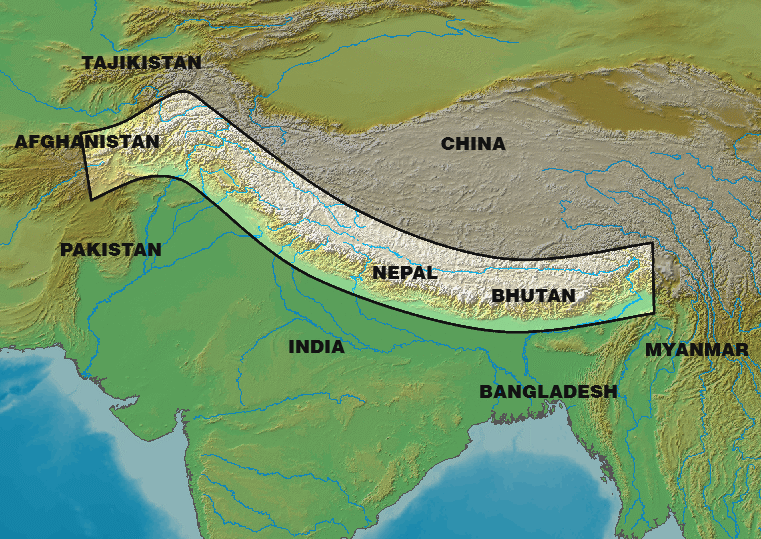

The Himalayan Rim is the Asian region surrounding the Himalayas.

== Definition ==
Geographically, it is surrounded by the Iranian Plateau in the west, Hindu Kush and Karakoram and Pamir ranges in the northwest, the Tibetan Plateau in the north, the Indochinese Peninsula in the east, and the Indian subcontinent in the south.

The countries bordering the Himalayas include China (Tibet in particular) to the north, Myanmar to the east, India, Bhutan, Nepal, Pakistan to the south (see also: Northern South Asia), and Afghanistan to the west.

== History ==
=== Pre-contemporary era ===
The Himalayas impacted the way that religions and cultures spread throughout Asia, as can be seen in the spread of Buddhism along the Silk Road, or the way that Tibetans interacted with Indic Himalayan peoples throughout history.

In the early second millennium, Buddhism became less prominent in South Asia, with Hinduism and Islam becoming the primary religions south of the Himalayas. By the early 16th century, Guru Nanak, the founder of Sikhism, brought the religion to the Himalayan Rim in his third udasi. During this time period, local Muslims, such as the Khache of Tibet, were participating in trans-Himalayan trade networks.

In the 19th century, as the East India Company had consolidated control over most of India, it began seeking influence and access to Himalayan routes and peripheral regions (see also: Great Game). Thus, in 1816, the Treaty of Sugauli was signed, affirming the India-Nepal border and establishing better relations in the region.

=== Contemporary era ===
In postcolonial times, various conflicts have broken out along the Himalayan Rim, such as the Chinese annexation of Tibet and the Indo-China War of 1962, and in general, there are significant tensions between various neighboring countries in the region as a result of border disputes. In the 21st century, disputes over fresh-water resources in the region are likely to intensify.

== See also ==
- List of territorial disputes
  - Territorial disputes of the People's Republic of China
  - Territorial disputes of India
- Indian Himalayan Region
  - Asian relations with Northeast India
- Third Pole
