= Zanskar River =

River in Ladakh, India

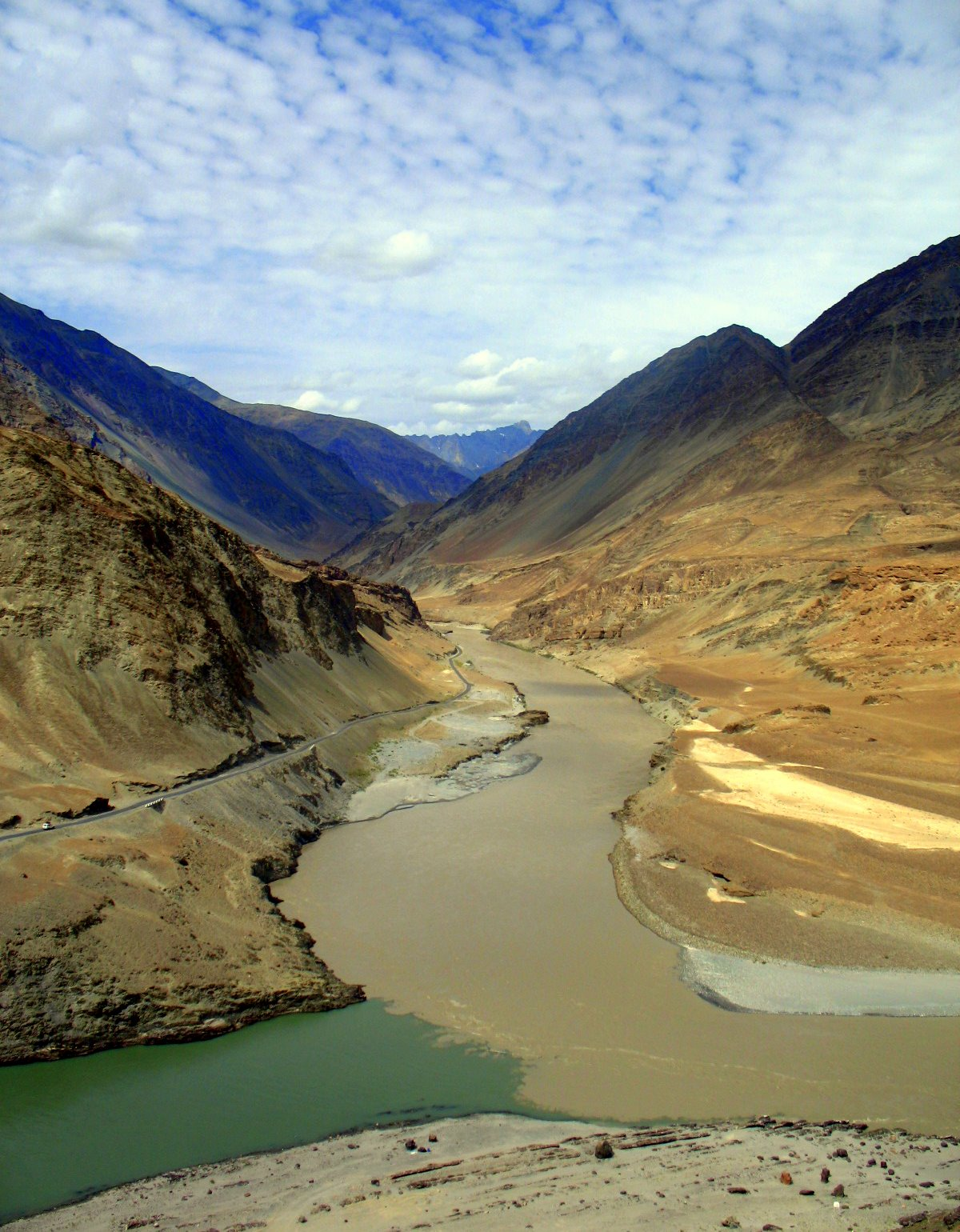
- Zanskar River

- Map of the Indus River System. The Zanskar is a tributary of the Indus.

- Location of mouth Zanskar River (India)

Location
- Country: India
- State: Ladakh

Physical characteristics
- Source
  - coordinates: 33°31′3″N 76°56′10″E
- Mouth
  - coordinates: 34°9′54″N 77°19′52″E

Basin features
- Progression: Indus→ Arabian Sea
- River system: Indus River

The Zanskar River is the first major tributary of the Indus River, equal or greater in volume than the main river, which flows entirely within Ladakh, India. It originates northeast of the Great Himalayan range and drains both the Himalayas and the Zanskar Range within the region of Zanskar. It flows northeast to join the Indus River near Nimo.

== Etymology ==
Zanskar (Zangs-kar) means "white copper" or brass.

== Course ==
In its upper reaches, the Zanskar has two main branches. First of these, the Doda, has its source near the Pensi-la 4,400 m (14,400 ft) mountain-pass and flows south-eastwards along the main Zanskar valley leading towards Padum, the capital of Zanskar. The second branch is formed by two main tributaries known as Kargyag river, with its source near the Shingo La 5,091 m (16,703 ft), and Tsarap river, with its source near the Baralacha-La. These two rivers unite below the village of Purne to form the Lungnak river (also known as the Lingti or Tsarap). The Lungnak river then flows north-westwards along a narrow gorge towards Zanskar's central valley (known locally as Gzhung khor), where it unites with the Doda river to form the main Zanskar river. This river then takes a north-eastern course through the dramatic Zanskar Gorge until it joins the Indus near Nimo in Ladakh.

== Tourism ==
Zanskar River in November

The area has homestays, Buddhist monastery and valley tourism.

Lower (northern) sections of that gorge are popular in summer with tourists making rafting trips, typically from Chiling to Nimmu. In winter when the road to Zanskar is closed by snow on the high passes, the only overland route to Padum is by walking along the frozen river, a multi-day hike that is now sold as an adventure activity called the Chadar Trek ('ice sheet'). This trek will eventually be rendered obsolete once the road from Chiling to Padum is completed.

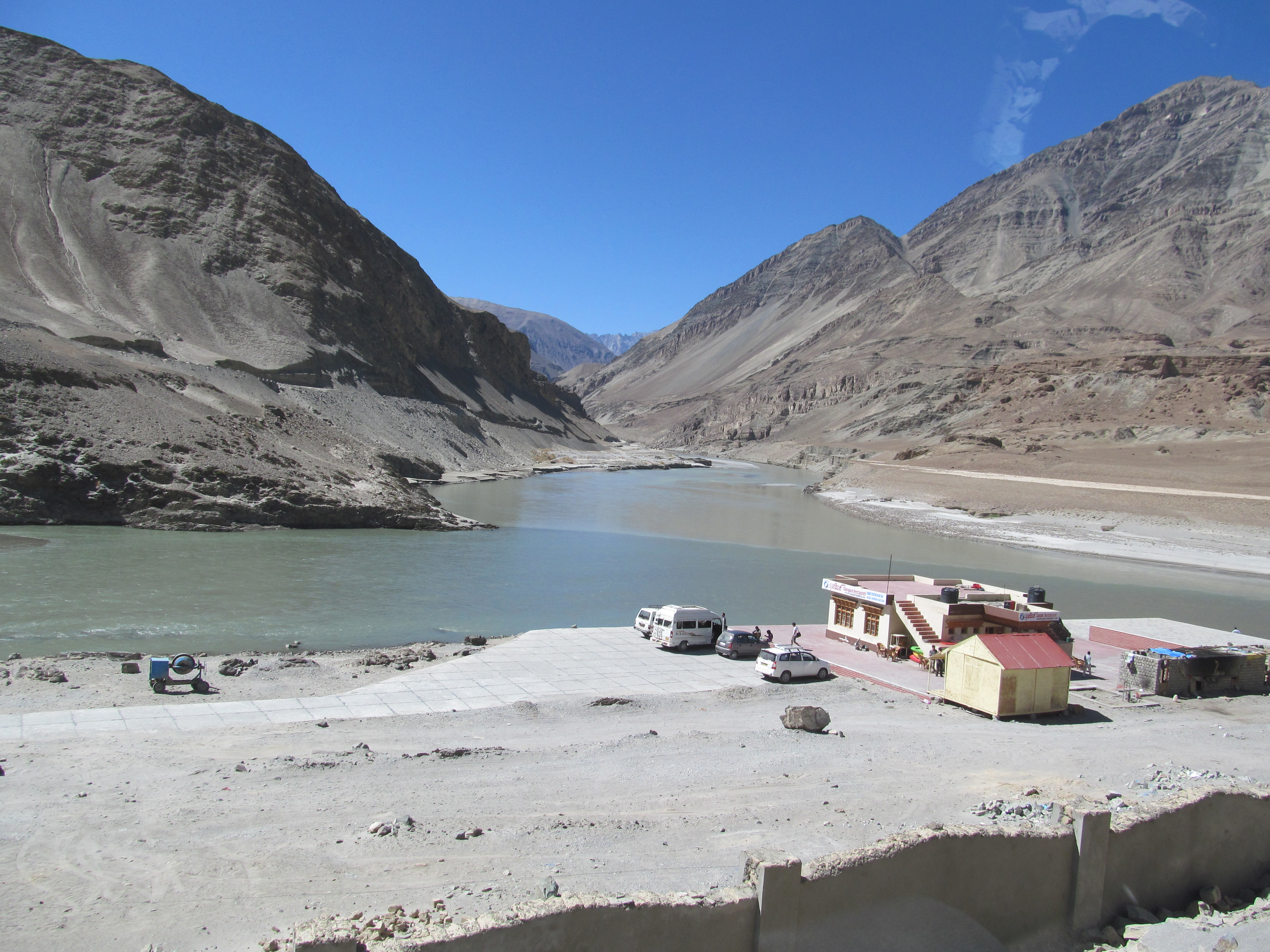
The confluence of the Zanskar River (from top) and the Indus (bottom flowing from left to right)

== See also ==
- Shyok River
- Suru River

== Bibliography ==
- Cunningham, Alexander (1854), Ladak: Physical, Statistical, Historical, London: Wm. H. Allen and Co – via archive.org
- Drew, Frederic (1875), The Jummoo and Kashmir Territories: A Geographical Account, E. Stanford – via archive.org
- Strachey, Henry (1854), Physical Geography of Western Tibet, London: William Clows and Sons – via archive.org
