= Suru River (Indus) =

River in India and Pakistan

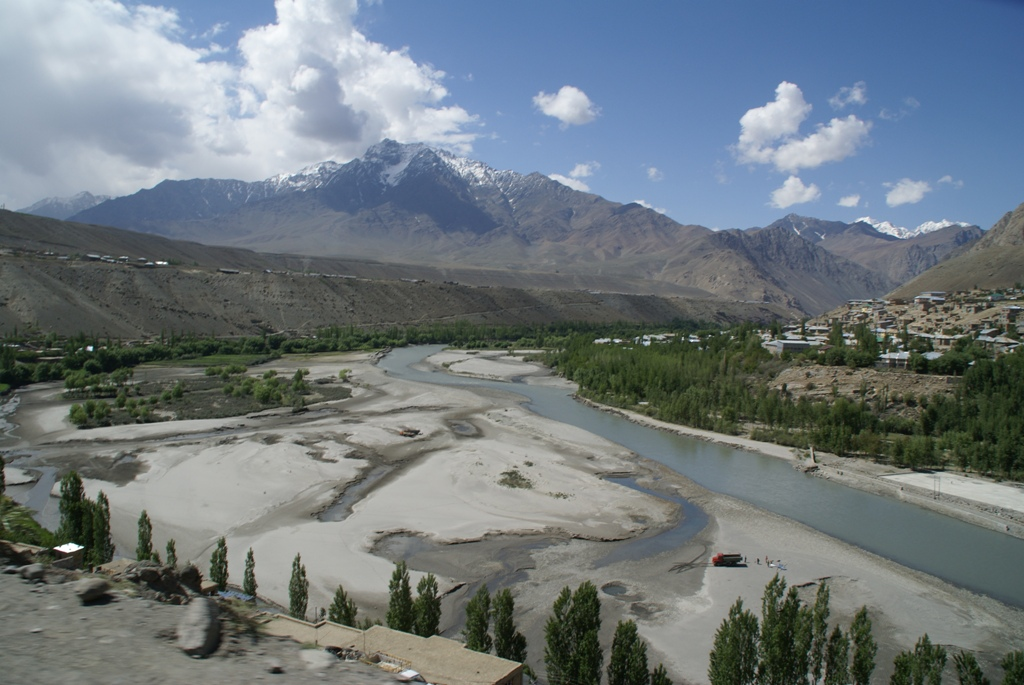
- Suru River passing through the town of Kargil

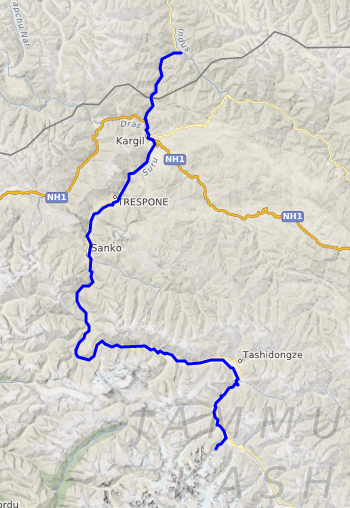
- Course of the Suru

Location
- Country: India, Pakistan
- Territory: Ladakh (India), Gilgit-Baltistan (Pakistan)
- District: Kargil (India), Skardu (Pakistan)

Physical characteristics
- Source: Panzella glacier
  - location: Pensi La Kargil, India
  - coordinates: 33.832917°N 76.21861°E
  - elevation: 4,555 m (14,944 ft)
- Mouth: Indus River
  - location: Marol, Kharmang District, Pakistan
  - coordinates: 34.746134°N 76.215927°E
  - elevation: 2,528 m (8,294 ft)
- Length: 185 km (115 mi)
- Discharge
  - average: 385 m^{3}/s (13,600 cu ft/s)

Basin features
- Progression: Indus→ Arabian Sea

The Suru River is a tributary of the Indus River that flows through the districts of Sankoo and Kargil in Ladakh, India, into the Kharmang District in Gilgit-Baltistan in Pakistan. It joins the Indus River near Marol. Near the Kargil Town, just before entering Baltistan, it is joined by the major tributary Dras River (or Shingo River). The combined river is also sometimes called Shingo River.

== Geography ==
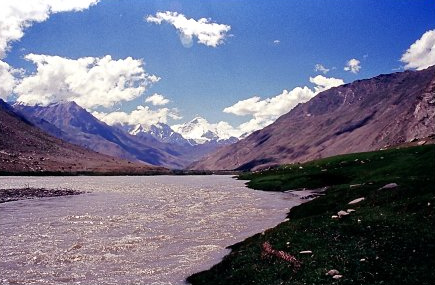
Nun Kun Mountain massif in the distance.

The Suru River is a 185 kilometres (115 mi) long river that originates from the Panzella glacier which lies at Pensi La pass near the Drang Drung Glacier (Pensilungpa Glacier). The Drang Drung Glacier also gives rise to the north-to-south flowing Stod River which flows down in the opposite direction from the Suru. The source of the Suru River lies 142 kilometres (88 mi) south of Kargil town, and 79 kilometres (49 mi) north of Zanskar. Srinagar, the capital of Jammu and Kashmir lies 331 kilometres (206 mi) to the west. The Suru River forms the western and northern boundary of the Zanskar Range. The river flows westward, along the NH301 Kargil-Zanskar Road, from its source and forms the Suru valley, which is towered by the massif of Nun Kun mountain. It drains the Nun Kun mountain massif of the Zanskar Range in the Suru valley, and is joined by a tributary "Chilling Nala" at the pastures of Gulmatango. This stream originates from the Parkachik Glacier. The Suru River then flows northwards, via Sankoo where it collects Lingber Lungpa tributary, through a deep-narrow gorge to Kargil town, where it is fed by the Botkul River which originates from the glacier of the same name. The Dras River, fed by the Shingo River, joins the Suru River at Hardas (also called Kharal), 7 kilometres (4.3 mi) north of Kargil town. The Suru River then enters the Pakistani Administered Kashmir 5 kilometres (3.1 mi) ahead from the point of merger of Dras and Suru rivers through Post 43 and Post 44 of India and Pakistan respectively and merges with the Indus River near Marol.

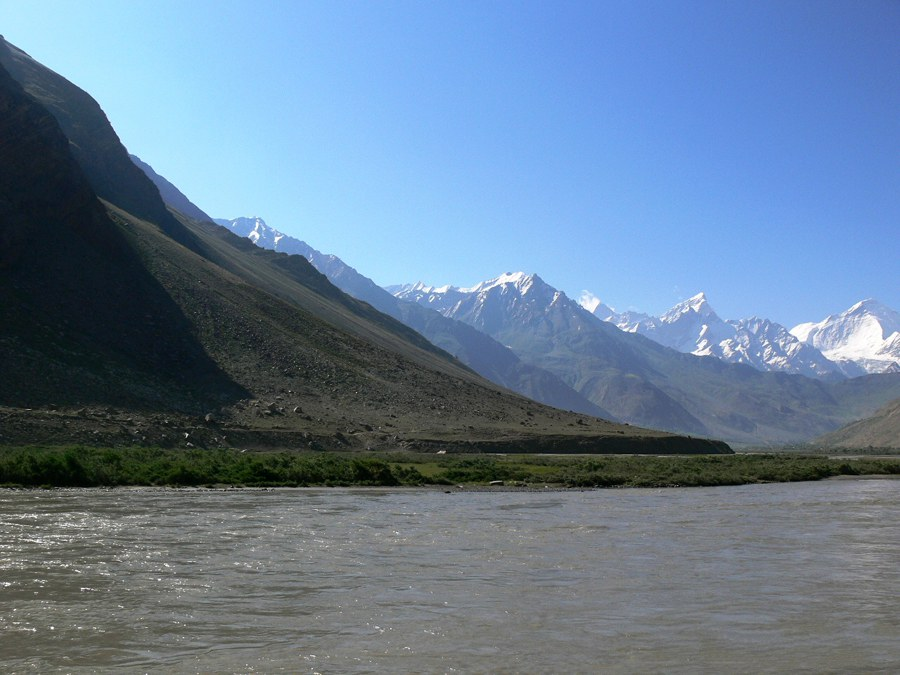
Suru River

The upper Suru Valley makes up the Sankoo district and the lower Suru Valley the Kargil district. The river flows through the towns of Sankoo, Tongul, Suru, Grantung, Goma, Kargil and Hardas. The Kargil town is the largest city situated on the banks of the Suru River, and also the second largest city in the Ladakh region after Leh. The trade route between Baltistan (Skardu) and Ladakh (Leh) once ran alongside the Suru River. The road is now closed due to the de facto partition of Kashmir between India and Pakistan.

== Economy ==
Agriculture in Ladakh is scarce due to the dry climate, and is restricted to the river valleys. The Suru valley, formed by the catchment of the Suru River, receives irrigation through the canals of the Suru River. The main crops grown in the valley include barley, buckwheat, turnips and mustard.

== Tourism ==
The Suru River has extensive possibilities for rafting and it is practised during the summer. The Suru Valley is the starting point for rafting trips, and it also provides a base for mountaineering expeditions to the Nun Kun mountain massif.

== Transport ==
NH301 Padum-Pensi La-Kargil Highway runs along the Stod/Doda River Valley from Padum (on Nimmu–Padum–Darcha road) in south to Pensi La (Penzi La) in north. From north of Pensi La, the highway runs further north through Suru River Valley to Kargil town (on NH1 Srinagar-Kargil-Leh Highway).

== See also ==
- Geography of Ladakh
- Tourism in Ladakh
