= Rangdum Monastery =

Tibetan Buddhist monastery in Julidok, Ladakh, India

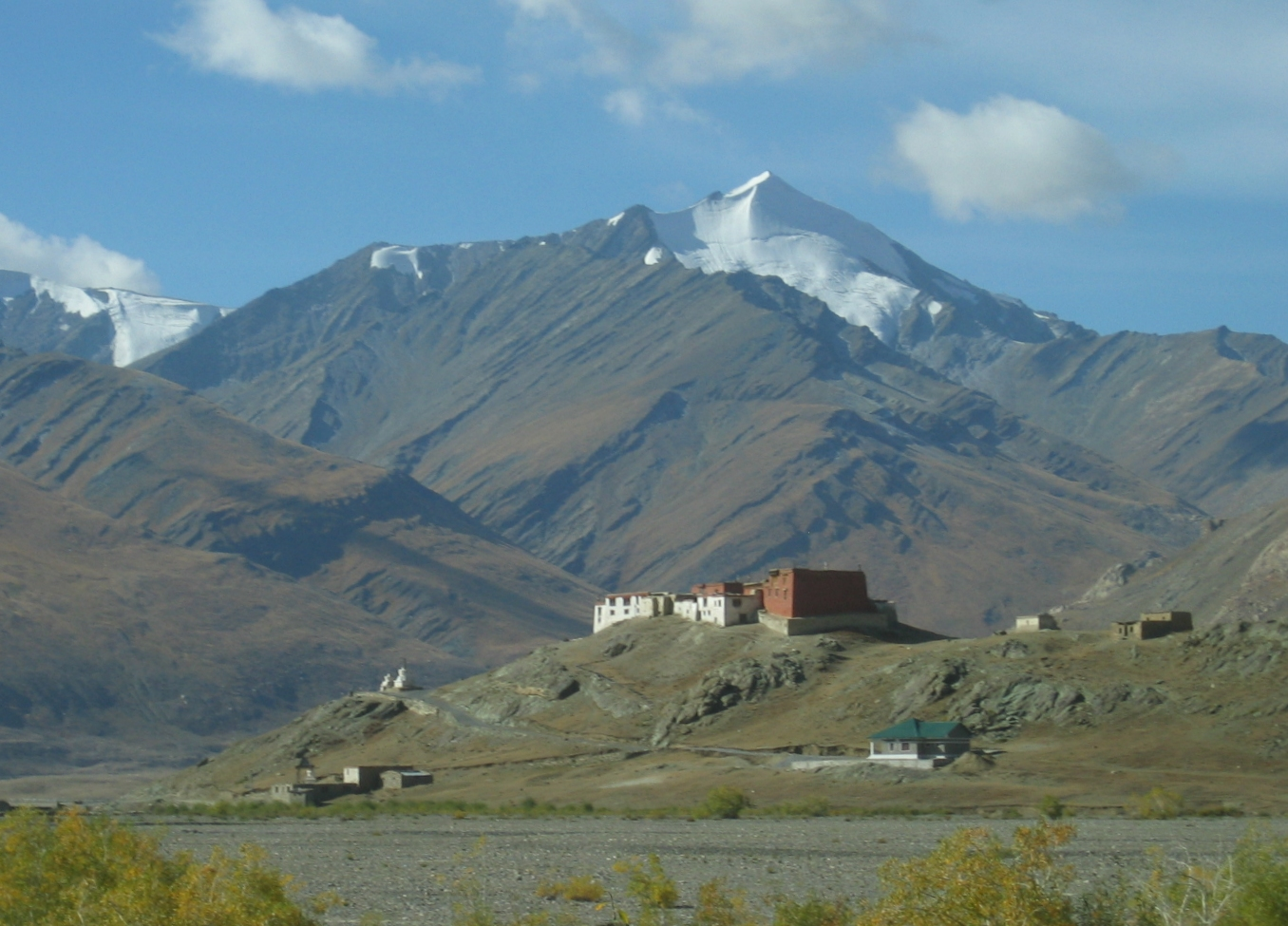
- Rangdum Monastery seen from the north

- Location in Ladakh, India

Religion
- Affiliation: Tibetan Buddhism
- Sect: Gelug

Location
- Location: Suru Valley, Ladakh, India
- Coordinates: 34.0366°N 76.3731°E

Architecture
- Established: 18th century

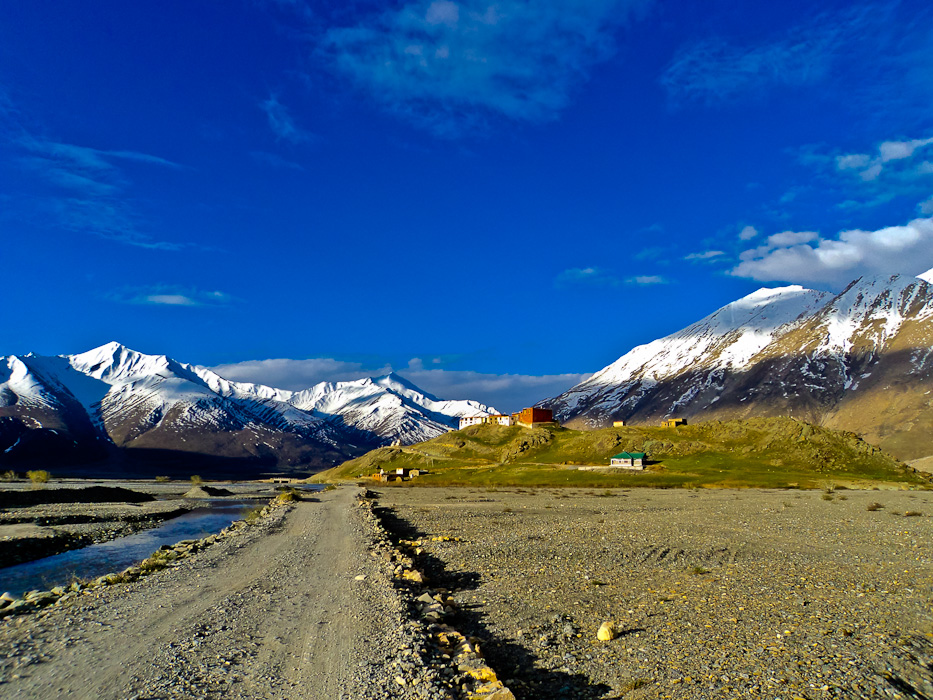
Rangdum Monastery

Rangdum Monastery (also known as Rangdum Gompa or Shadup Dzamlinggyan) is a Tibetan Buddhist monastery belonging to the Gelugpa sect, situated on top of a small but steep sugarloaf hill at an altitude of 4,031 m (13,225 ft) at the head of the Suru Valley, in Ladakh. It is next to the tiny village of Julidok (Zulidok), and about 25 km north of the 4,400 m (14,436 ft) Pensi La (pass), which leads into Zanskar. It is on Padum-Sankoo-Kargil Road, 103 km northwest of Padum, 87 km southeast of Sankoo & 196 southeast of Kargil. The monastery was electrified using solar energy in June 2017 by Global Himalayan Expedition (GHE)

== History ==
According to an inscription the monastery was built by Gelek Yashy Takpa during the reign of King Tsewang Namgyal II (1753-1782) of Ladakh.

Although it is physically in the Suru Valley, it is culturally part of Zanskar.

Because the summer's brevity sometimes interferes with crop harvests, to supplement the locally produced dairy products, both the village and the monastery depend on outside supplies brought up the largely barren Suru Valley, or over the 4,400 metre (14,436 ft) Pensi La pass from Zanskar. The monastery was electrified using solar energy in June 2017 by Global Himalayan Expedition, along with the nearby village of Shakma Karpo. The first two female engineers of the region trained by Barefoot College and GHE executed the project.

The monastery is home to about 30 monks and almost as many donkeys. To ensure income for the nearby local communities, GHE has set up homestays in the villages, allowing travelers to visit the monastery while experiencing an authentic culture in the homestays.

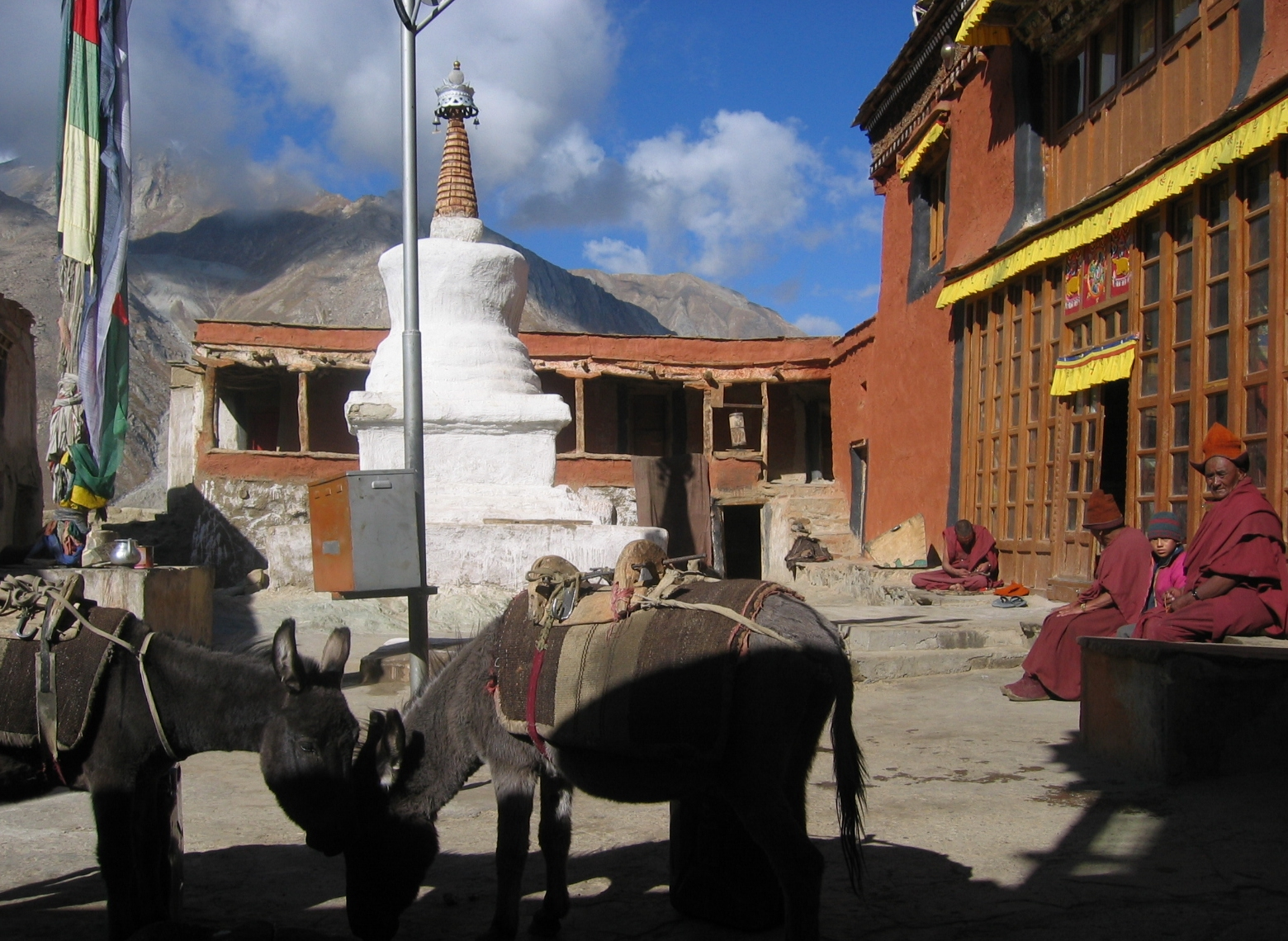
View of the monastery's interior courtyard with some of its famous donkeys

== See also ==
- List of buddhist monasteries in Ladakh
- Geography of Ladakh
- Tourism in Ladakh
