= Phey =

- Village
- Location in Ladakh, India Phey (India)
- Coordinates: 34.1334873°N 77.4658948°E
- Country: India
- Union Territory: Ladakh
- District: Leh
- Tehsil: Leh
- Elevation: 3,186 m (10,453 ft)

Population (2011)
  - Total: 331
- Time zone: UTC+5:30 (IST)
- 2011 census code: 854

Phey is a village in the Leh district of Ladakh, India. It is located in the Leh tehsil.

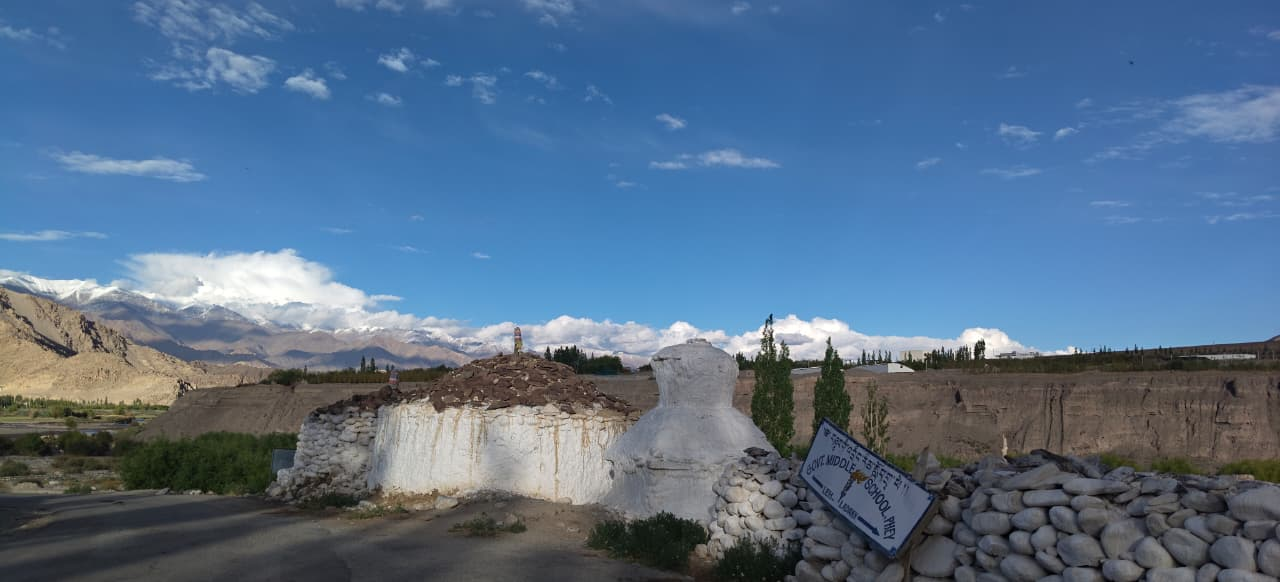
Phey Village, Leh, Ladakh

== Demographics ==
According to the 2011 census of India, Phey has 57 households. The effective literacy rate (i.e. the literacy rate of population excluding children aged 6 and below) is 83.16%.

Demographics (2011 Census)
	Total	Male	Female
Population	331	184	147
Children aged below 6 years	34	14	20
Scheduled caste	0	0	0
Scheduled tribe	281	153	128
Literates	247	150	97
Workers (all)	166	90	76
Main workers (total)	57	39	18
Main workers: Cultivators	0	0	0
Main workers: Agricultural labourers	0	0	0
Main workers: Household industry workers	0	0	0
Main workers: Other	57	39	18
Marginal workers (total)	109	51	58
Marginal workers: Cultivators	76	27	49
Marginal workers: Agricultural labourers	1	1	0
Marginal workers: Household industry workers	1	0	1
Marginal workers: Others	31	23	8
Non-workers	165	94	71

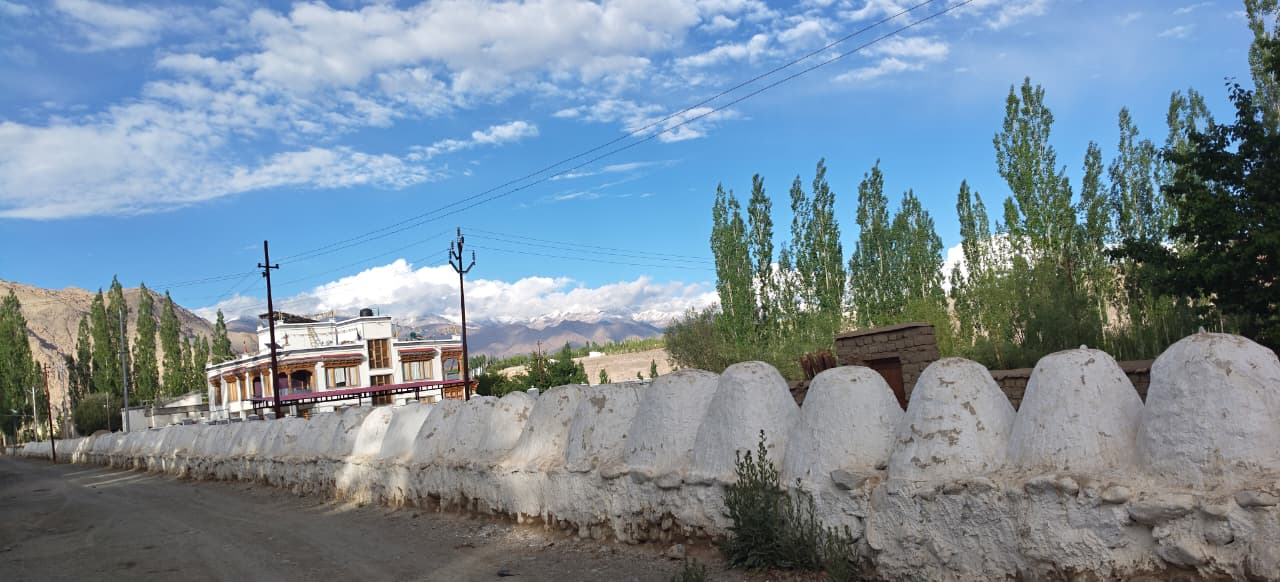
108 Chortens in Peh
