= Tsarap River =

River in Ladakh, India

Tsarap River Tsarap Chu
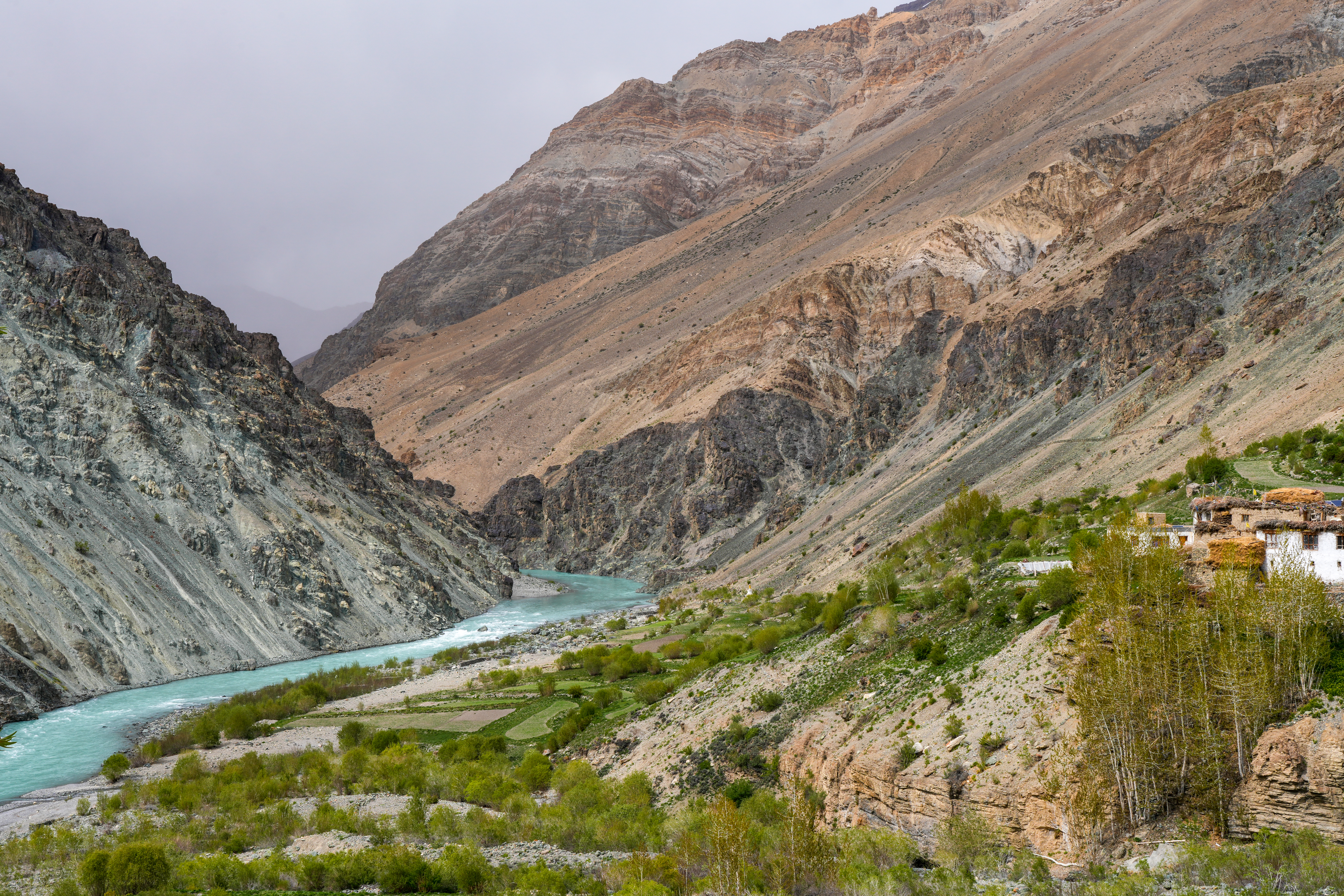
- Tsarap River at Yugar, opposite Phuktal Gompa

Location
- Country: India
- State: Ladakh
- Region: Zanskar
- District: Kargil

Physical characteristics
- Source: 32.69796°N 77.890177°E
  - location: Pankpo La, Sarchu
  - elevation: 4,650 m (15,260 ft)
- Mouth: 33.515855°N 76.933805°E
  - location: Stod River together forms Zanskar River at Padum Zanskar
  - elevation: 3,485 m (11,434 ft)
- Length: 182 km (113 mi)
- Discharge
  - average: 208 m^{3}/s (7,300 cu ft/s)

Basin features
- River system: Indus Basin
- Tributaries
  - left: Stod River

Tsarap River, also known as Tsarap Chu, forms the eastern part of the Zanskar valley, in the Ladakh union territory of India. The 182 km (113 mi) long river is used for irrigation in riparian villages, and for adventure sports by tourists.

== Geography ==
The Tsarap River has its source in the glaciers near Pankpo La Pass at the border of Ladakh and Himachal Pradesh. After rising from its source, the Tsarap River flows north-east up to Sarchu, a camping site at the Leh-Manali Highway. Here the Tsarap River joins a confluence of three rivers: of Lingti, Yunan and Sarchu River. At village Purne, the Tsarap River is joined by Kargyag River, which originates near the Shingo La pass. Then the Tsarap River flows down the main Zanskar valley, through the towns of Mone, Tichip, Jamyang Lang, Dorzong and Chia. The river then meets the Stod River at a confluence near Padum, the capital of Zanskar. Together, these two rivers form the Zanskar River, a tributary of the Indus River.

The Tsarap River contributes to the minimal agricultural production of the Zanskar valley, mainly to the lower areas of Chia, by providing irrigation to the fields of barley, wheat, buckwheat and peas. Accessible in the summer, the Pensi La mountain pass which connects Zanskar with rest of the country, receives heavy snowfall along with the other pass, Zojila, which results in the valley being cut off during winter from rest of the state, with the river freezing during this season. The river source at Pankpo La near Sarchu lies 255 kilometres (158 mi) southeast from the nearest airport of Leh. The Tsarap River is famous for adventure sports. Rafting events are organised in the Tsarap, Stod and the Zanskar rivers.

== Landslide dam ==
A lake was formed on the Tsarap River due to a landslide dam at 33°17′25″N 77°17′06″E, 90 miles (140 km) upstream (south) of Padum, the commercial hub of Zanskar. The landslide, which occurred on 31 December 2014 between Shun and Phuktal villages, was first noticed when the Alchi Hydroelectric Power Project downriver reported a drop in water level. The dam created by the debris was 60 metres (200 ft) high, 90 metres (300 ft) wide and 600 metres (2,000 ft) long and the artificial lake was at 80% of the height of the debris. As of 1 February 2015, the artificial lake formed behind the dam was nearly 14 kilometres (8.7 mi) long and covered about 110 hectares of land.

The barrier was believed to be fine-grained, with boulders having a narrow crest. A report submitted by local authorities prohibited the use of explosives to clear the debris, for fear that it would trigger more landslides and aggravate the situation. They called on the National Disaster Management Authority for assessment of the situation. According to the deputy collector of Zanskar, "The lake has been created around 90 km from the Padam area of Zanskar and beyond 43 km no one can go by foot. After consulting all local engineers, including Army engineers, we were not able to do anything". On 20 February 2015, the National Disaster Management Authority submitted a report after a ground survey. The committee, headed by the Union Cabinet Secretary, deployed a team at the site to carry out controlled blasting and manual work to allow channelized flow of water.

The severe temperatures in the region, below -20 °C, had frozen the lake and chances of a breach would rise with a temperature increase in the following days. Authorities closed down the old trade route, the Chadar Trek, and airlifted the people stranded therein to safer places. People living downstream of Tsarap were also warned to move to higher ground. Control rooms were set up at Padum and Phuktal to keep watch on the situation.

The landslide dam burst on May 7, 2015, washing away 13 bridges as far away as Padum, 90 km (56 mi) downstream. Two school buildings and numerous residences were destroyed.

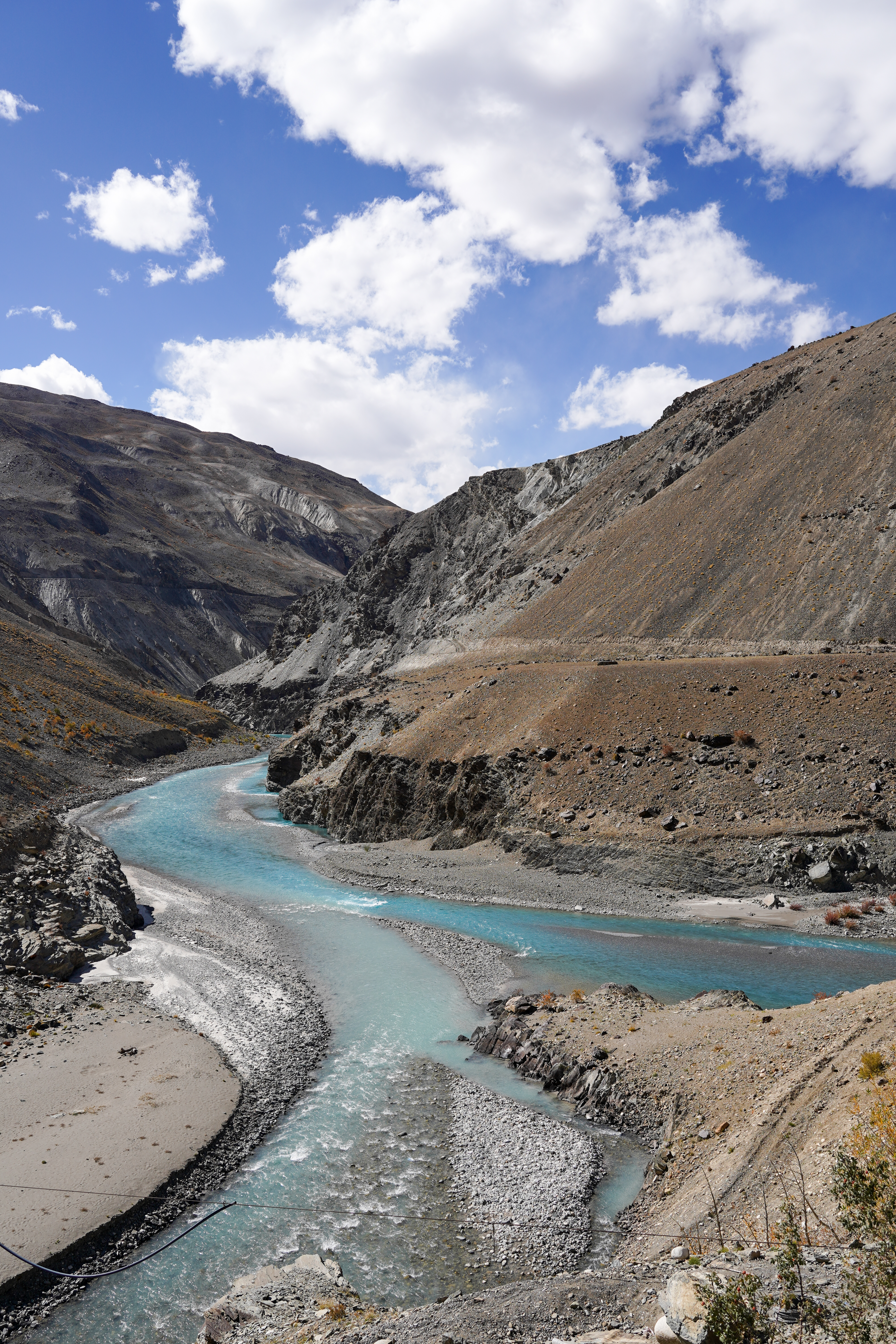
Kargiakh confluence with the Tsarap, below Purne

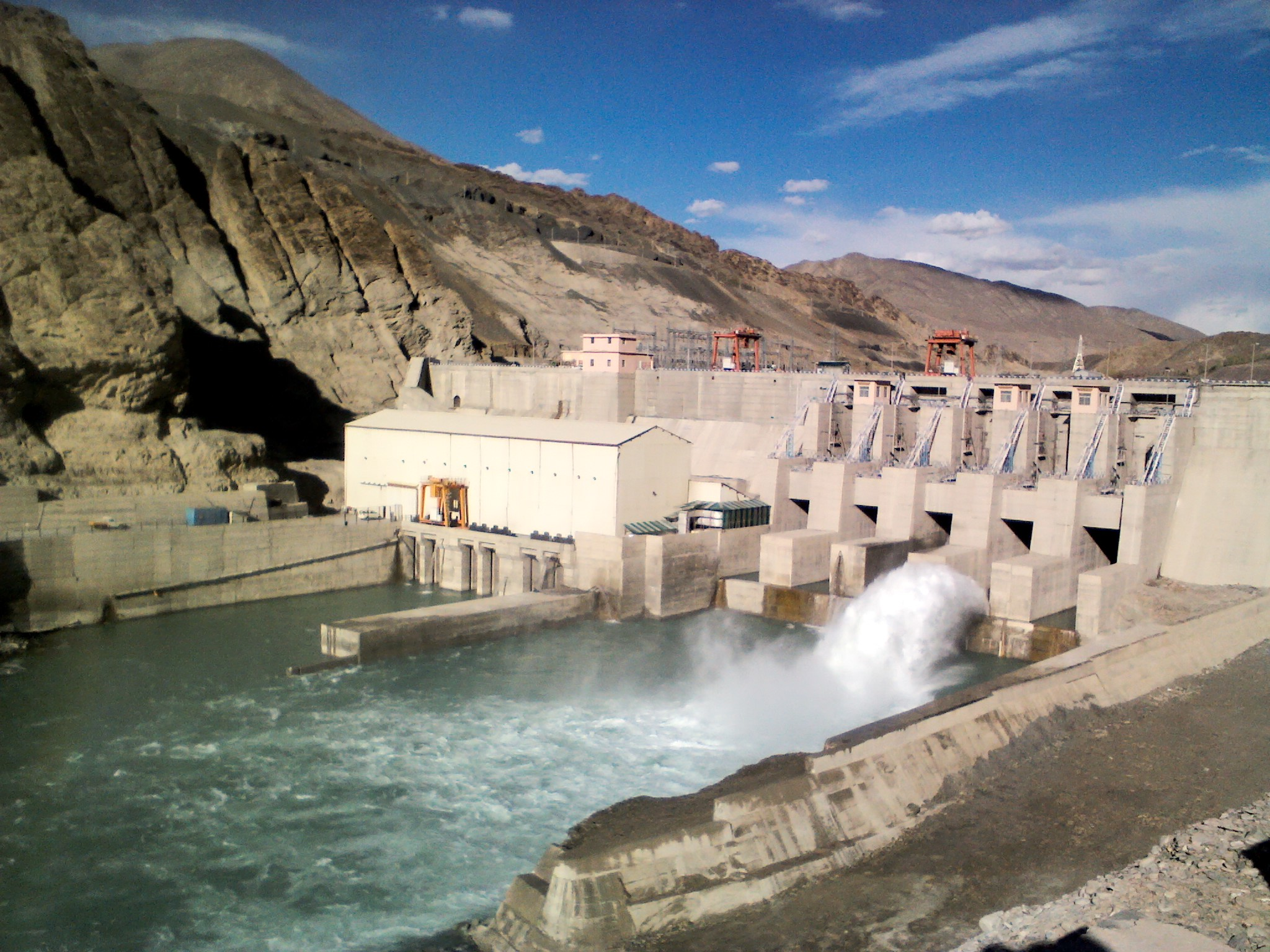
Alchi Hydroelectric Power Project down the river

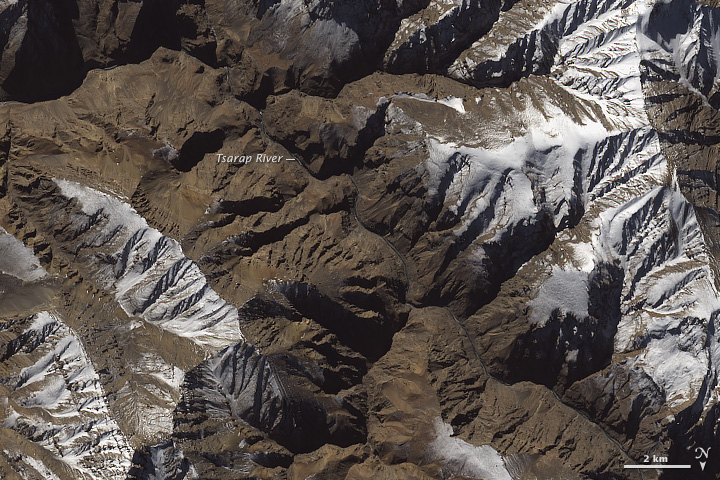
Satellite image of the Tsarap River in December 2014 before the landslide

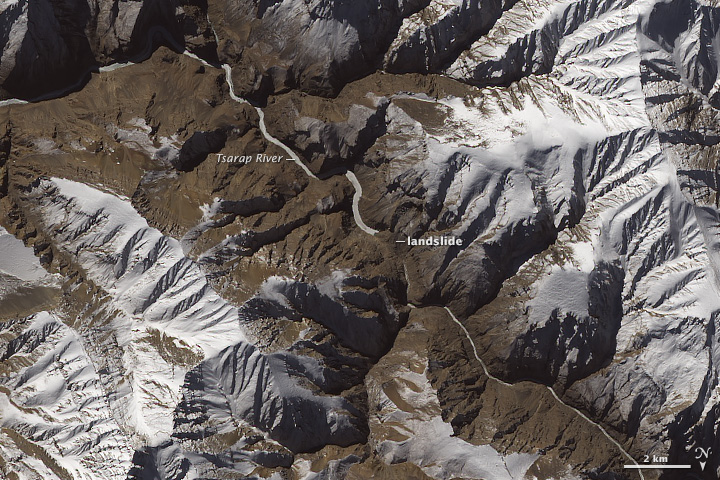
Satellite image of the Tsarap River in January 2015 showing the landslide and lake building up. In addition, the river is frozen and is covered in snow
