= Doda River =

Doda River Stod River
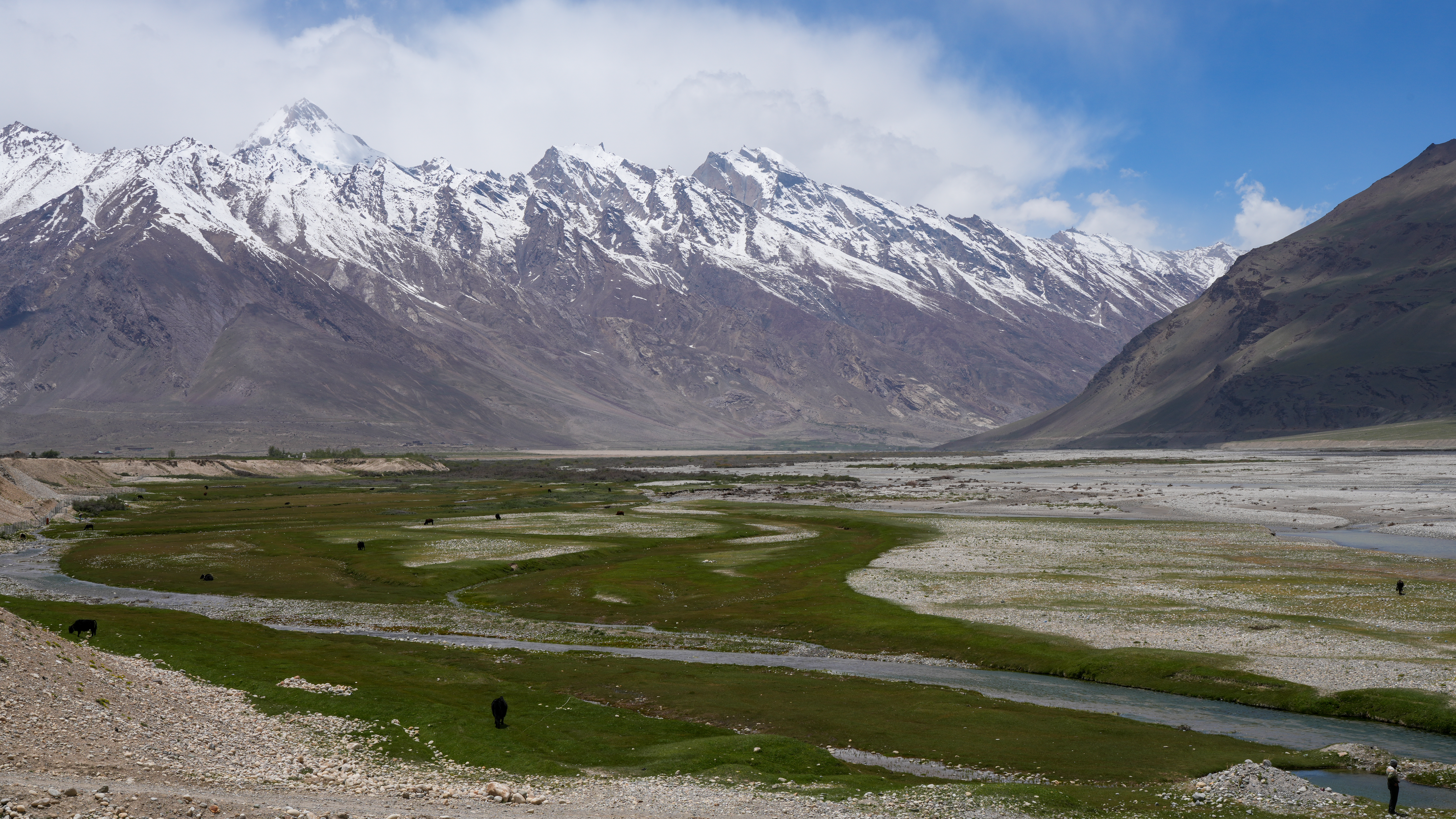
- Stod River near Padum

Location
- Country: India
- Union Territory: Ladakh
- District: Kargil

Physical characteristics
- Source: 33.794578°N 76.339341°E
  - location: Drang-Drung Glacier at Pensi La
  - elevation: 4,560 m (14,960 ft)
- Mouth: 33.515855°N 76.933805°E
  - location: Tsarap River together forms Zanskar River at Padum, Zanskar
  - elevation: 3,485 m (11,434 ft)
- Length: 79 km (49 mi)
- Discharge
  - average: 206 m^{3}/s (7,300 cu ft/s)

Basin features
- River system: Indus Basin
- Tributaries
  - right: Tsarap River

The Doda River or the Stod River is a river 79 kilometres (49 mi) long, which forms the Stod Valley in the Zanskar valley of the Leh district in the Union Territory of Ladakh in India.

NH301 Padum-Pensi La-Kargil Highway runs along the Stod/Doda River Valley from Padum in south to Pensi La in north. From north of Pensi La (Penzi La), the highway runs further north through Suru valley to Kargil town.

== Geography ==
The Doda River rises from the Drang-Drung Glacier near Pensi La, a mountain pass off the Zanskar-Kargil road. The Drang-Drung Glacier is a river of ice and snow by itself and is the largest glacier other than the Siachen Glacier in Ladakh outside the Karakoram Range. It gives rise to a mountain peak named Doda Peak, 21,490 ft (6,550 metres) high, and gives its name to the Doda district, which lies in the rear of the glacier. The Doda River is also known as Stod River. After rising from its source, the Doda River flows southeast along the Kargil — Zanskar road in the main Zanskar valley, through the towns of Akshu, Abran, Kushol and Phey. The river then meets the Tsarap River at a confluence near Padum, the capital of Zanskar. Together, these two rivers form the Zanskar River, a tributary of the Indus River.

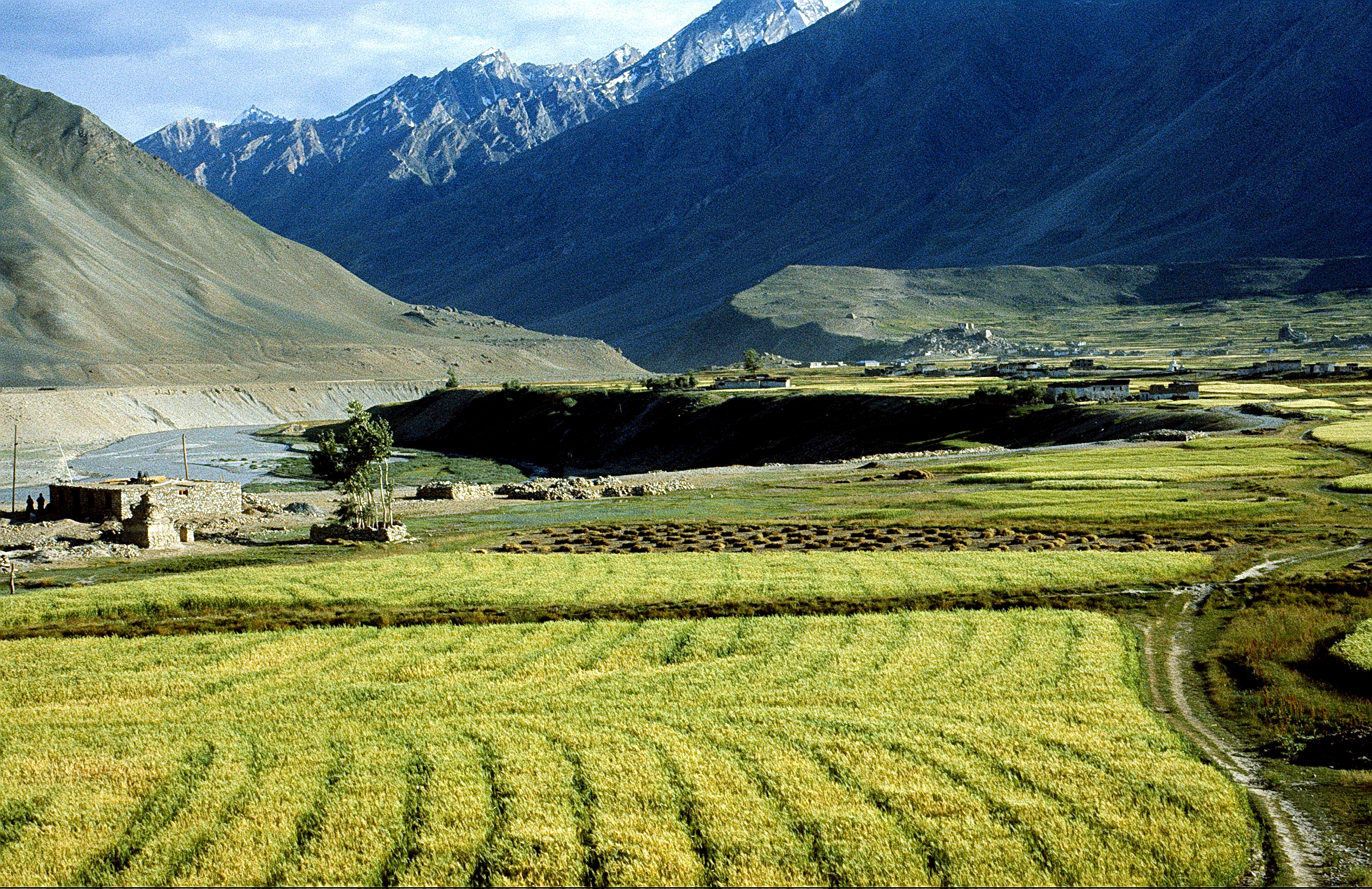
The river at Kursha Monastery

The Doda River contributes to the minimal agricultural production of the Zanskar valley by providing irrigation to the fields of barley, wheat, buckwheat and peas. Accessible in the summer, the Pensi La mountain pass at the source of the river receives heavy snowfall along with the other pass, Zojila, which cuts off the Stod Valley from the rest of the country during the winter season when the river freezes. The river source at Pensi La lies 350 kilometres (220 mi) east from Srinagar, the capital of Jammu and Kashmir. The Doda River is famous for adventure sports. Rafting events are organised along the length of the Doda and the Zanskar.

== See also ==
- Geography of Ladakh
- Tourism in Ladakh
