= Pensi La =

Mountain pass in India

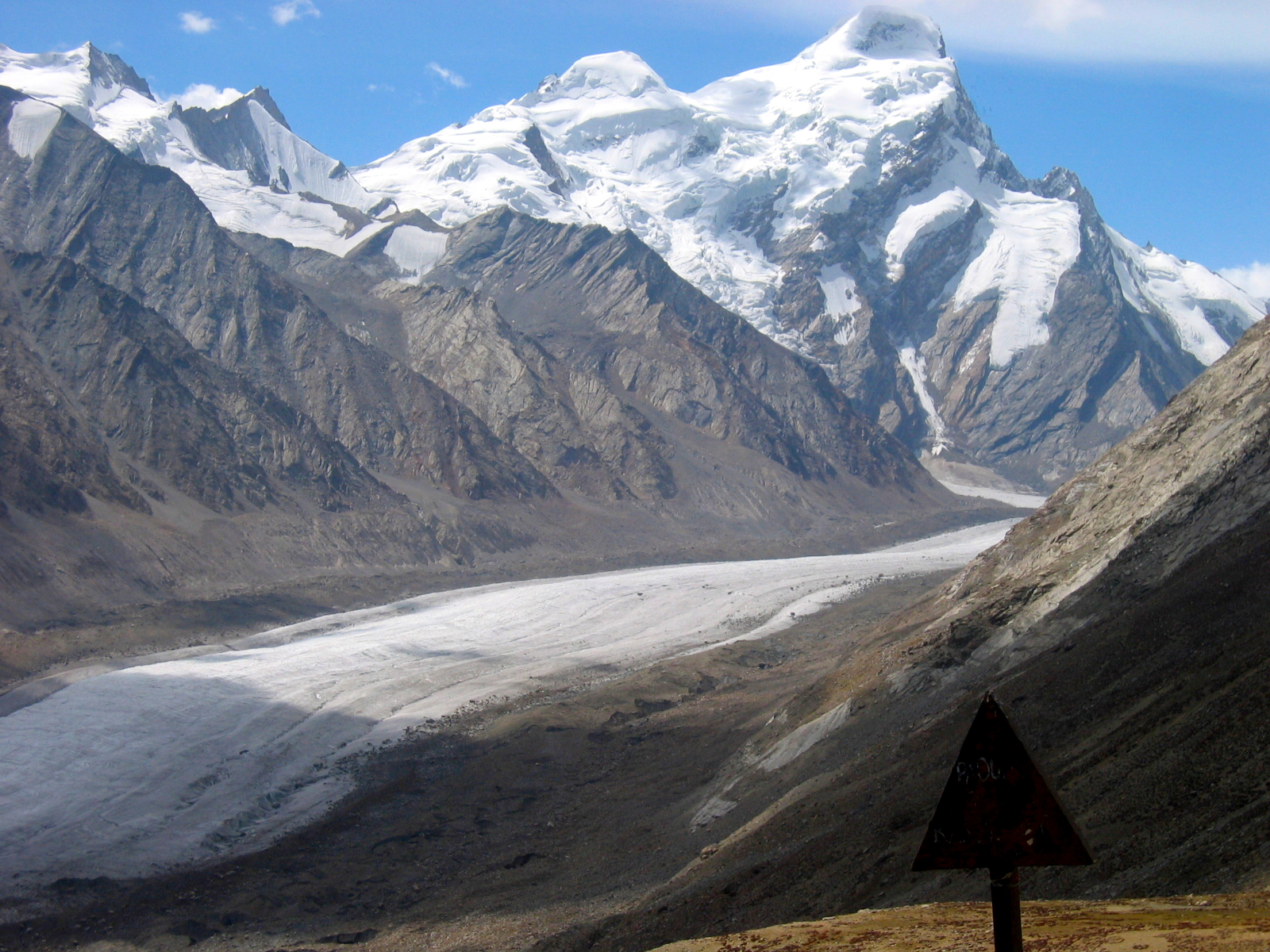
- Drang-Drung Glacier seen from the Pensi-La pass

- Location within Ladakh Location within India
- Interactive map of Pensi La
- Elevation: 4,400 metres (14,400 ft)

Third Approach
- Location: Ladakh, India
- Range: Himalaya
- Coordinates: 33°52′04″N 76°21′19″E

Pensi-la (Pensi Pass) is a mountain pass in the Ladakh union territory of India, which is known as the Gateway to Zanskar. Pensi La is 4,400 metres (14,400 ft) above sea level and connects the Suru Valley region to the Zanskar Valley region. The summit at this end of the Suru Valley, the only peak which can be seen, is 7,012 metres (23,005 ft) high, while the mountain to the north is 6,873 metres (22,549 ft). The pass is about 25 km from Rangdum Monastery.

The Pensi La pass is located on the 240 km-long NH301 Kargil-Padum Highway which connects Kargil town to Padum via Suru Valley. Before the modern NH301 highway was built, the Pensi La used to be open only three months of the year because of heavy snows, and now it remains open for 6 to 7 months and still shuts down during the winter snow, hence there is an ongoing unfulfilled demand for the Pensi La tunnel for all-weather connectivity for boosting geostrategic logistics and tourism in this underdeveloped area.

== Geography ==
To the west of Pensi La watershed flows the south-to-north flowing Suru River, an important tributary of the Indus, which it meets at Kargil. The Drang-Drung Glacier on the eastern flank of Pensi La is the source of north-to-south flowing Stod River or Doda River, which flows into the Padum Valley, and joins with Tsarap Chu to form the Zanskar River.

"The descent from the Pensi La into the Stod Valley [in Zanskar] is steeper than the climb up from Rangdum Gompa, but not too difficult. The road winds about with many hairpin turns, which can be cut across on foot, to the river below. Wild rhubarb can be seen growing on the slopes. The generally used trekking route follows the road on the left bank of the Stod (or Doda). . . . The grass at the foot of the Pensi La furnishes a good pasturage and this is a fine camping spot."

== Gallery ==
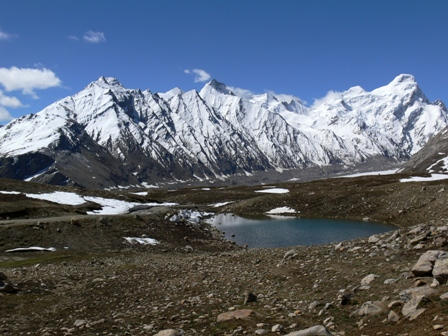
View of Glacial lake and the Drang Drung Glacier, as seen from Pensi La, Zanskar, Ladakh, India.

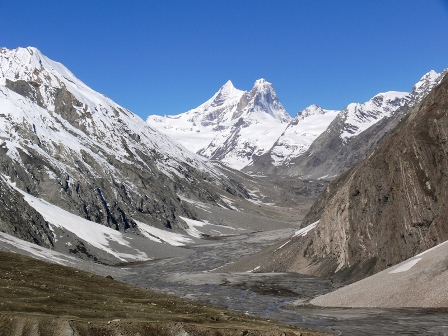
Pensi La Peak - Source of Stod River

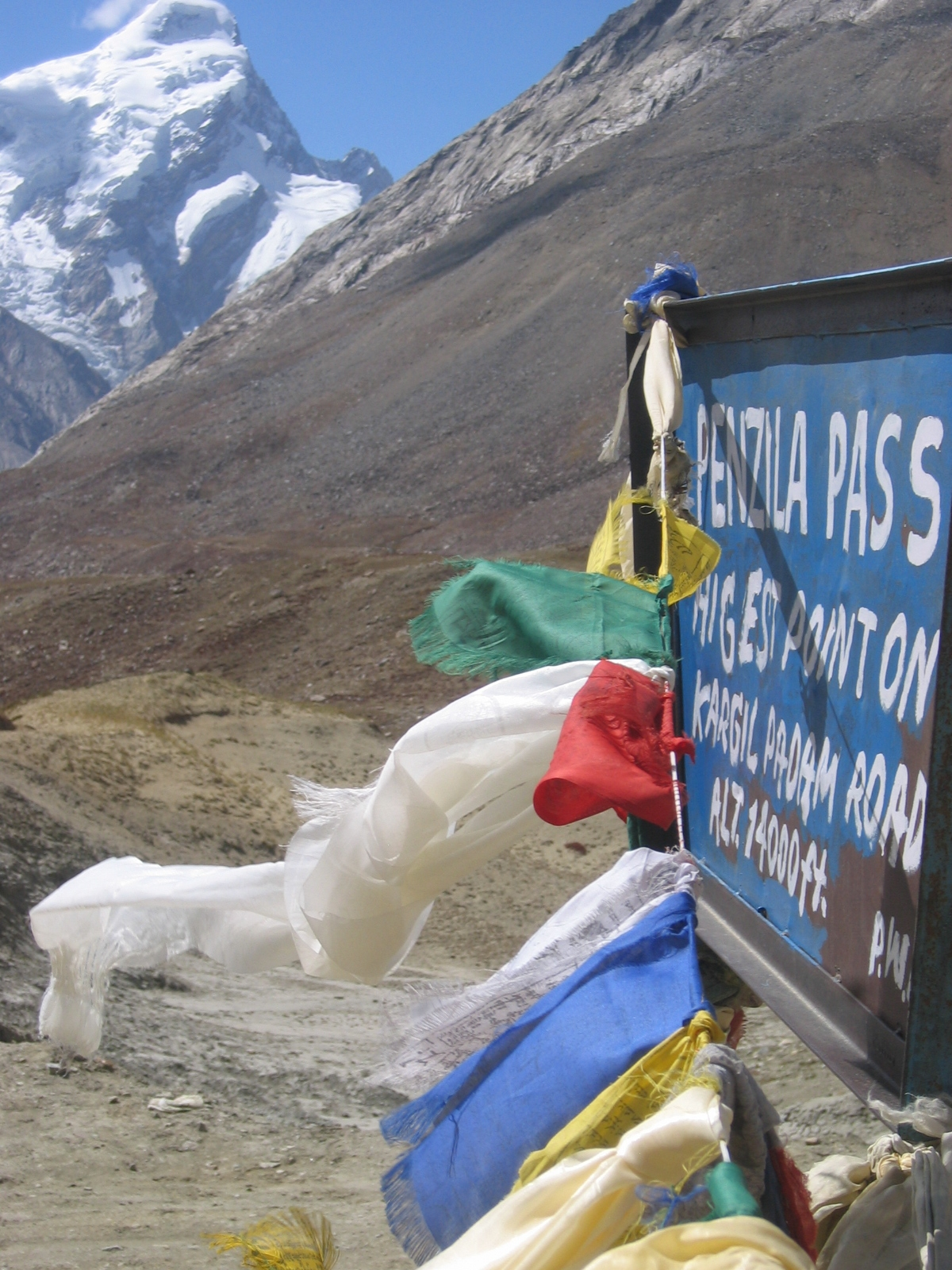
Buddhist prayer flags flutter at the highest point of the road pass

== See also ==
- Geography of Ladakh
- Tourism in Ladakh
