= Hardas =

- Village
- Interactive map of Hardas
- Location in Ladakh, India Hardas (Kashmir) Hardas (India)
- Coordinates: 34°36′19″N 76°05′46″E
- Country: India
- Union Territory: Ladakh
- District: Kargil
- Tehsil: Kargil

Area
  - Total: 71.2 km^{2} (27.5 sq mi)

Population (2011)
  - Total: 1,480
  - Density: 20.8/km^{2} (53.8/sq mi)

Languages
  - Official: Hindi, English
  - Spoken: Balti
- Time zone: UTC+5:30 (IST)
- PIN: 194103
- Census code: 974

Hardas (Alternative Spellings Har Dras, Hardras, Hardass, and Hardus) is a village in Kargil district of the Indian union territory of Ladakh, close to the India–Pakistan border (LOC). The village is located 10 kilometres north of Kargil, the district headquarters, on the left of the Dras River.

== Geography ==
Hardas is on the left bank of the Dras River, shortly before its confluence with the Suru River. The village is laid out on a large alluvial plain formed by a mountain stream. The villagers had built a three-mile long aqueduct to channel the water from the steam to water the farms and gardens of the village, which was described with much admiration by Alexander Cunningham.

Closer to the confluence of Dras and Suru is the hamlet of Kharal, (Note: Alternative spellings: Karal, Kharol, and Kharul.) on a small alluvial plain inside the wide bend of the Dras River as it joins the Suru. During the British Raj period, there was a rest house at Kharal. There was also a bridge over the Dras River, called "Kharol bridge", which was a necessary part of the route from Kargil to Skardu as well as Kargil to Drass (and Kashmir beyond it).

The present highway between Srinagar and Kargil runs on the right bank of the Dras River. The road to Skardu continues to exist but breaks at the Line of Control just before the Gangani village of Baltistan.

== Demographics ==
Most of the population of the village are Balti. According to the 2011 census of India, Hardas has 233 households. The literacy rate of Hardas was 76.24%. In Hardas, Male literacy stands at 87.86% while the female literacy rate was 64.25%.

Demographics (2011 Census)
	Total	Male	Female
Population	1480	739	741
Children aged below 6 years	247	113	134
Scheduled caste	0	0	0
Scheduled tribe	1335	674	661
Literacy	76.24%	87.86%	64.25%
Workers (all)	305	247	58
Main workers (all)	134	–	–
Marginal workers (total)	171	139	32

== Transport ==
Hardas is well-connected by road to other places in Ladakh and India by the Srinagar-Leh Highway or the NH 1.

The nearest major railway stations to Hardas is the Srinagar railway station located at a distance of 223 kilometres.

The nearest airport is at Kargil located at a distance of 18 kilometres but it is currently not operational. The next nearest major airports are Srinagar International Airport and Leh Airport located at a distance of 219 kilometres and 225 kilometres.

== Maps ==
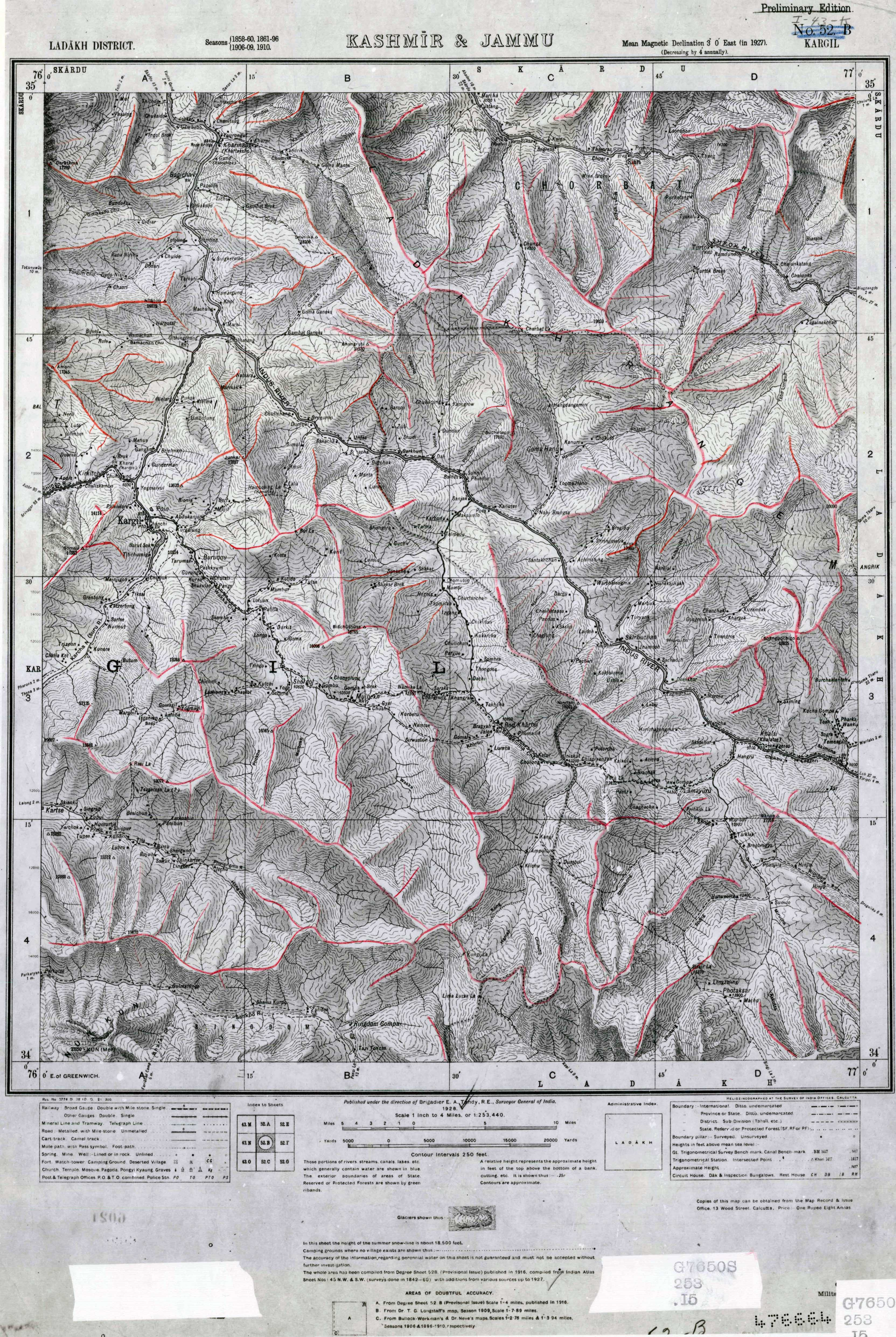
SoI map, 1928

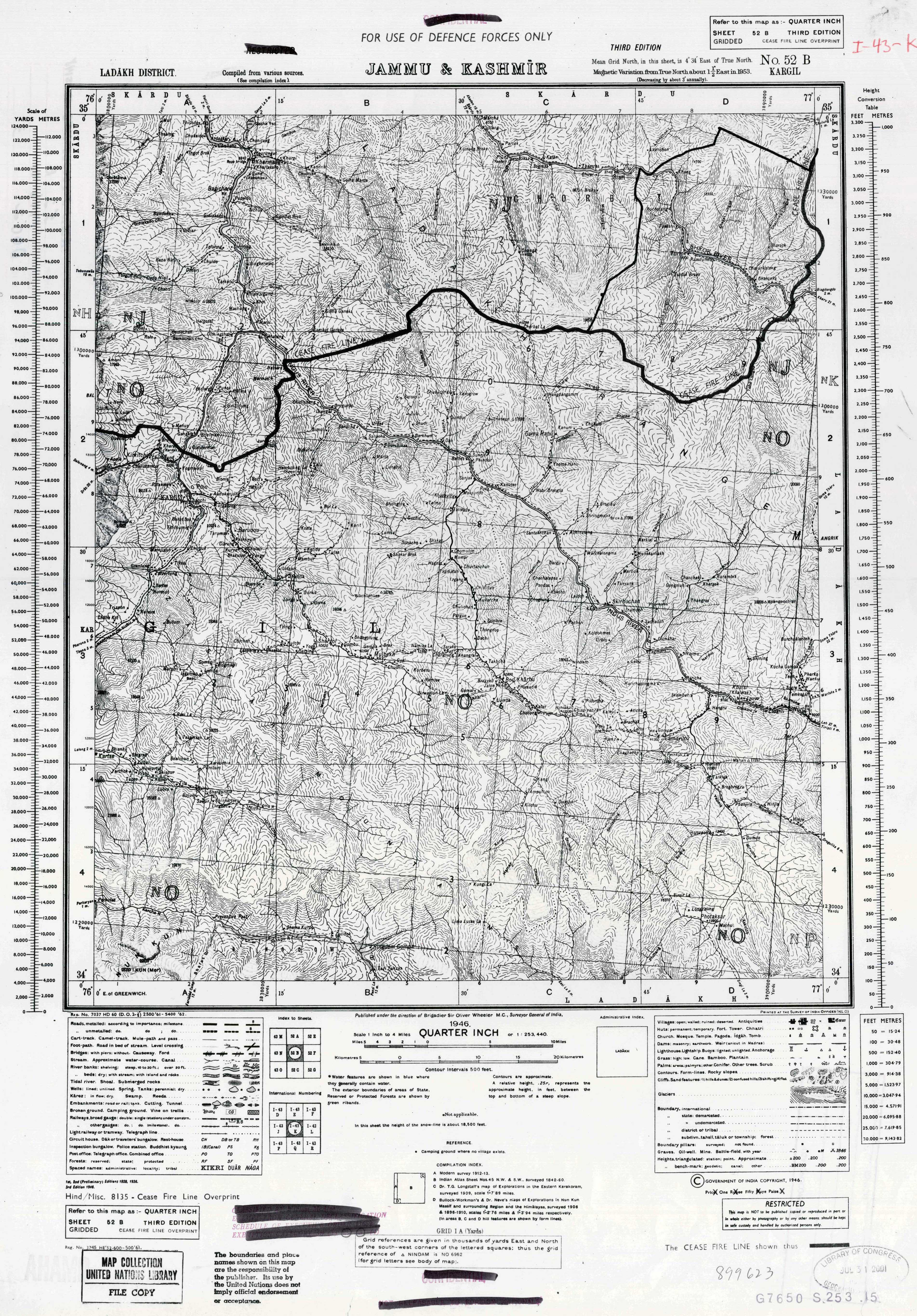
SoI map, 1946, showing the 1948 LoC

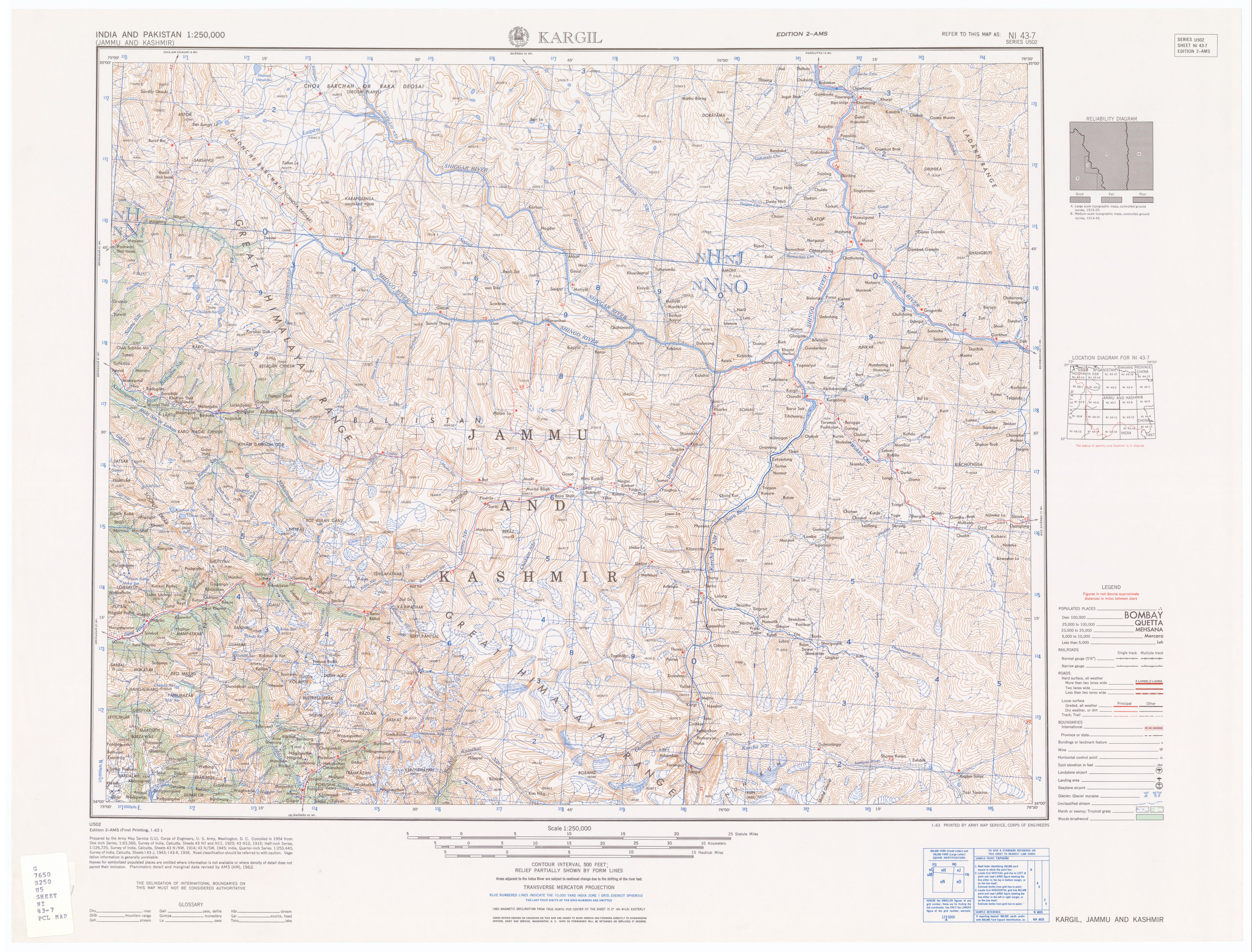
Map showing "Kharal (Hardus)" (AMS, 1955)

== See also ==
- Hunderman

== Bibliography ==
- Gazetteer of Kashmir and Ladak, Calcutta: Superintendent of Government Printing, 1890 – via archive.org
- District Census Handbook: Kargil (PDF), Directorate of Census Operations, Jammu and Kashmir, 2011, archived from the original (PDF) on 21 November 2017
- Dani, Ahmad Hasan (2001), History of Northern Areas of Pakistan: Upto 2000 A.D., Sang-e-Meel Publications, ISBN 978-969-35-1231-1 – via archive.org
- Filippi, Filippo de (1912), Karakoram and Western Himalaya 1909, New York: E. P. Dutton and Company – via archive.org
