= Kharbu =

Kharbu Kharboo
- Village
- Location in Ladakh, India Kharbu (India)
- Coordinates: 34.53°N 75.98°E
- Country: India
- Union Territory: Ladakh
- District: Drass
- Tehsil: Thasgam

Population (2011)
  - Total: 1,074

Languages
  - Official: Hindi, English
  - Spoken: Shina, Urdu
- Time zone: UTC+5:30 (IST)
- PIN: 194103

Kharbu or Kharboo is a village in Thasgam tehsil in Drass district of the Indian union territory of Ladakh. The village is located 26 kilometres from Kargil.

== Demographics ==
According to the 2011 census of India, Kharbu has 145 households. The literacy rate of Kharbu village is 79.23%. In Kharbu, Male literacy stands at 93.58% while the female literacy rate was 64.29%.

Demographics (2011 Census)
	Total	Male	Female
Population	1074	566	508
Children aged below 6 years	188	114	74
Scheduled caste	0	0	0
Scheduled tribe	1064	559	505
Literacy	79.23%	93.58%	64.29%
Workers (all)	345	231	114
Main workers (all)	170	–	–
Marginal workers (total)	175	92	83

== Transport ==
=== Road ===
Kharbu is well-connected by road to other places in Ladakh and India by the Srinagar-Leh Highway or the NH 1.

=== Rail ===
The nearest railway station to Kharbu is the Srinagar railway station located at a distance of 201 kilometres.

=== Air ===
The nearest airport is at Kargil located at a distance of 35 kilometres but it is currently non-operational. The next nearest major airports are Srinagar International Airport and Leh Airport located at a distance of 198 kilometres and 241 kilometres.

== See also ==
- Ladakh
- Kargil
- Suru Valley
- Drass
