= Jusgund =

Jusgund Jasgound
- Village
- Location in Ladakh, India Jusgund (India)
- Coordinates: 34.38°N 75.68°E
- Country: India
- Union Territory: Ladakh
- District: Drass
- Tehsil: Thasgam

Population (2011)
  - Total: 467

Languages
  - Official: Hindi, English
  - Spoken: Shina, Urdu
- Time zone: UTC+5:30 (IST)
- PIN: 194105

Jusgund (also called Jasgound) is a village in Thasgam tehsil in Drass district of the Indian union territory of Ladakh. The village is located 30 kilometres from Kargil.

== Demographics ==
According to the 2011 census of India, Jusgund had 53 households. The literacy rate of Jusgund village is 78.92%. In Jusgund, Male literacy stands at 88.46% while the female literacy rate was 69.68%.

Demographics (2011 Census)
	Total	Male	Female
Population	467	224	243
Children aged below 6 years	97	42	55
Scheduled caste	0	0	0
Scheduled tribe	464	223	241
Literacy	78.92%	88.46%	69.68%
Workers (all)	95	84	11
Main workers (all)	53	–	–
Marginal workers (total)	42	39	3

== Transport ==
=== Road ===
Jusgund is connected by road to other places in Ladakh and India by the NH 301.

=== Rail ===
The nearest major railway stations to Jusgund are Sopore railway station and Srinagar railway station located at a distance of 247 kilometres and 253 kilometres.

=== Air ===
The nearest airport is located in Kargil at a distance of 36 kilometres but it is currently non-operational. The next nearest major airport is Leh Airport located at a distance of 243 kilometres.

== See also ==
- Ladakh
- Kargil
- Drass
