= Goshan =

- Village
- Location in Ladakh, India Goshan (India)
- Coordinates: 34.40°N 75.79°E
- Country: India
- Union Territory: Ladakh
- District: Drass
- Tehsil: Drass

Population (2011)
  - Total: 1,485

Languages
  - Official: Hindi, English
  - Spoken: Purgi, Shina, Urdu
- Time zone: UTC+5:30 (IST)
- PIN: 194102

Goshan is a village in Drass tehsil in Drass district of the Indian union territory of Ladakh.

== Demographics ==
According to the 2011 census of India, Goshan had 189 households. The literacy rate of Goshan village is 76.49%. In Goshan, Male literacy stands at 85.07% while the female literacy rate was 67.13%.

Demographics (2011 Census)
	Total	Male	Female
Population	1485	763	722
Children aged below 6 years	290	140	150
Scheduled caste	0	0	0
Scheduled tribe	1476	758	718
Literacy	76.49%	85.07%	67.13%
Workers (all)	370	249	121
Main workers (all)	100	–	–
Marginal workers (total)	270	162	108

== Transport ==
=== Road ===
Goshan is connected by road to other places in Ladakh and India by the Srinagar–Leh Highway or the NH 1.

=== Rail ===
The nearest railway stations to Goshan are Sopore railway station and Srinagar railway station located at a distance of 178 kilometres and 185 kilometres. The nearest major railway station is Jammu Tawi railway station located at a distance of 445 kilometres.

=== Air ===
The nearest airport is located in Kargil at a distance of 85 kilometres but it is currently non-operational. The next nearest major airports are Srinagar International Airport and Leh Airport located at a distance of 183 kilometres and 292 kilometres.

== See also ==
- Ladakh
- Kargil
- Drass
