= Hunderman =

- Hamlet
- Location within Ladakh Location within India
- Coordinates: 34.616°N 76.130°E
- Country: India
- Union Territory: Ladakh
- District: Kargil
- Tehsil: Kargil

Government
  - Type: Panchayati raj
  - Body: Gram panchayat

Population (2011)
  - Total: 216

Languages
  - Official: Balti, Ladakhi, Urdu
- Time zone: UTC+5:30 (IST)
- PIN: 194103

Hunderman or Hundarmaan or Hundurmaan is one of the northernmost hamlets in India and is situated in the Kargil district of Ladakh. Located on the right bank of Suru River 10 km north of Kargil, it is a hamlet under Shilikchey village of Kargil district. It was under Pakistan's control until 1971, when the hill range around it was captured by the Indian Army.There are two parts to Hunderman: Hunderman Mal (lower village, on the riverbank) and Hunderman Broq (hill village).

== History ==
At the end of the Indo-Pakistani War of 1947, Hunderman came under the control of Pakistan. The Indian Army captured Hunderman after the Indo-Pakistani War of 1971.

== Tourism ==
Hunderman–Museum of Memories in Hunderman Boq was founded by restoring three rooms in one of the private houses in the row of abandoned storied traditional houses in Hunderman. After the India Pakistan 1971 War, the residents of Hunderman moved to higher slopes of mountains, abandoning the original Hunderman village at LoC at the lower heights. It displays the old kitchen utensils, traditional jewelry, indoor games, family documents, letters to armaments from the wars. Ilyas Ansari, who has native connection to this village, along with Ajaz Hussain Munshi, museum curator from Kargil and other organizations (the Roots Collective and the Farside Collective of Leh), built the museum.

== Demographics ==
According to the 2011 census of India, Hunderman has a population of about 216.

Demographics (2011 Census)
	Total	Male	Female
Population	216	107	109
Children aged below 6 years	27	14	13
Scheduled caste	0	0	0
Scheduled tribe	215	–	–
Literates	118	70	48
Literacy Rate	54.6%	–	22.2%
Workers (all)	38	–	–
Non-workers	178	–	–

== Transport ==
Hunderman is connected by road to other places in Ladakh and India by the Srinagar-Leh Highway or the NH 1 and the LOC View Point Road.

The nearest railway station is Srinagar railway station, 229 kilometres away. The nearest airport is at Kargil, 18 kilometres away. Nearest major airport is Leh Airport, 225 kilometres away.

== See also ==
- Dras War Memorial
