= List of airports in Ladakh =

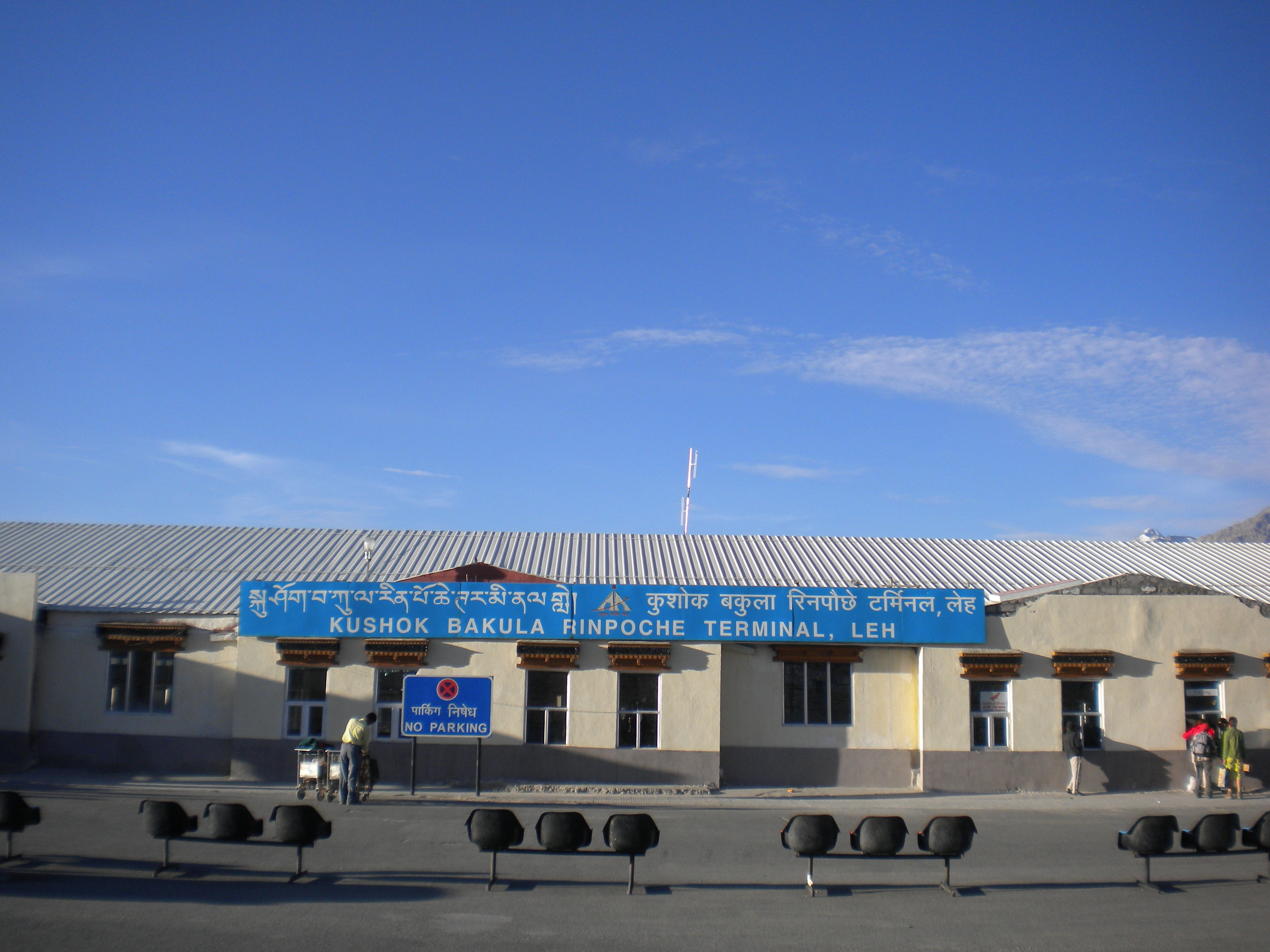
Kushok Bakula Rimpochee Airport, Leh

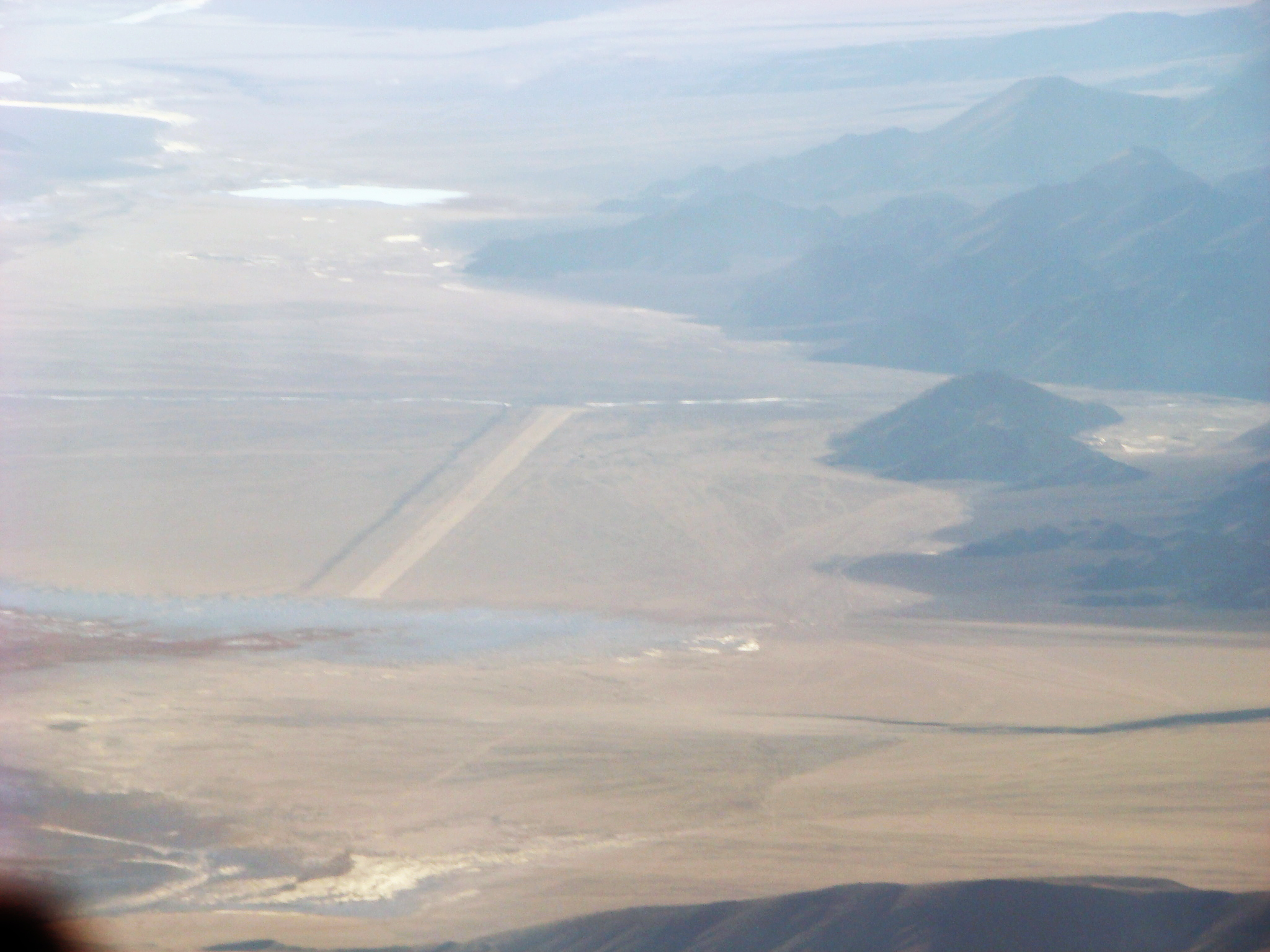
Fukche Advance Landing Ground

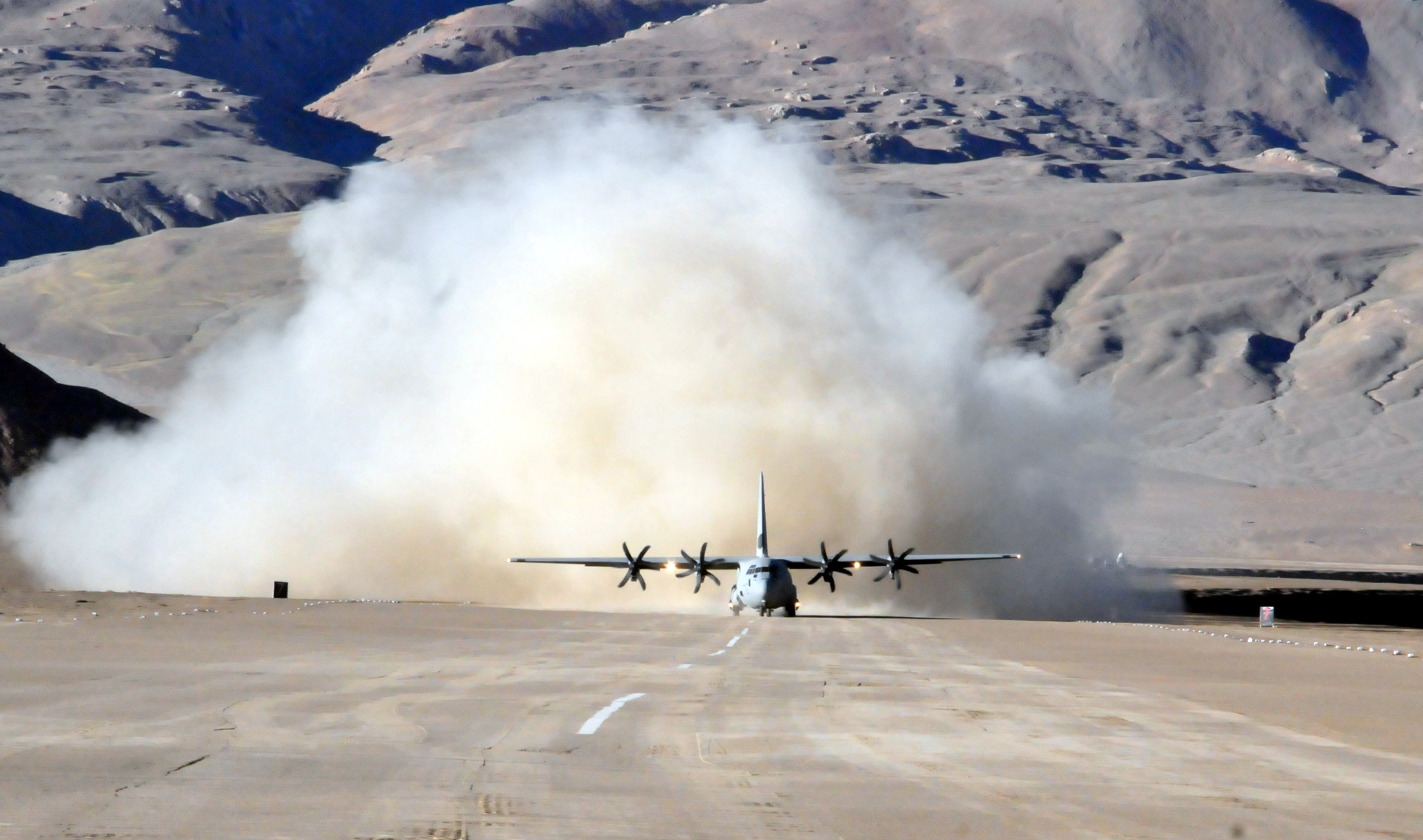
IAF C-130J aircraft at Daulat Beg Oldie

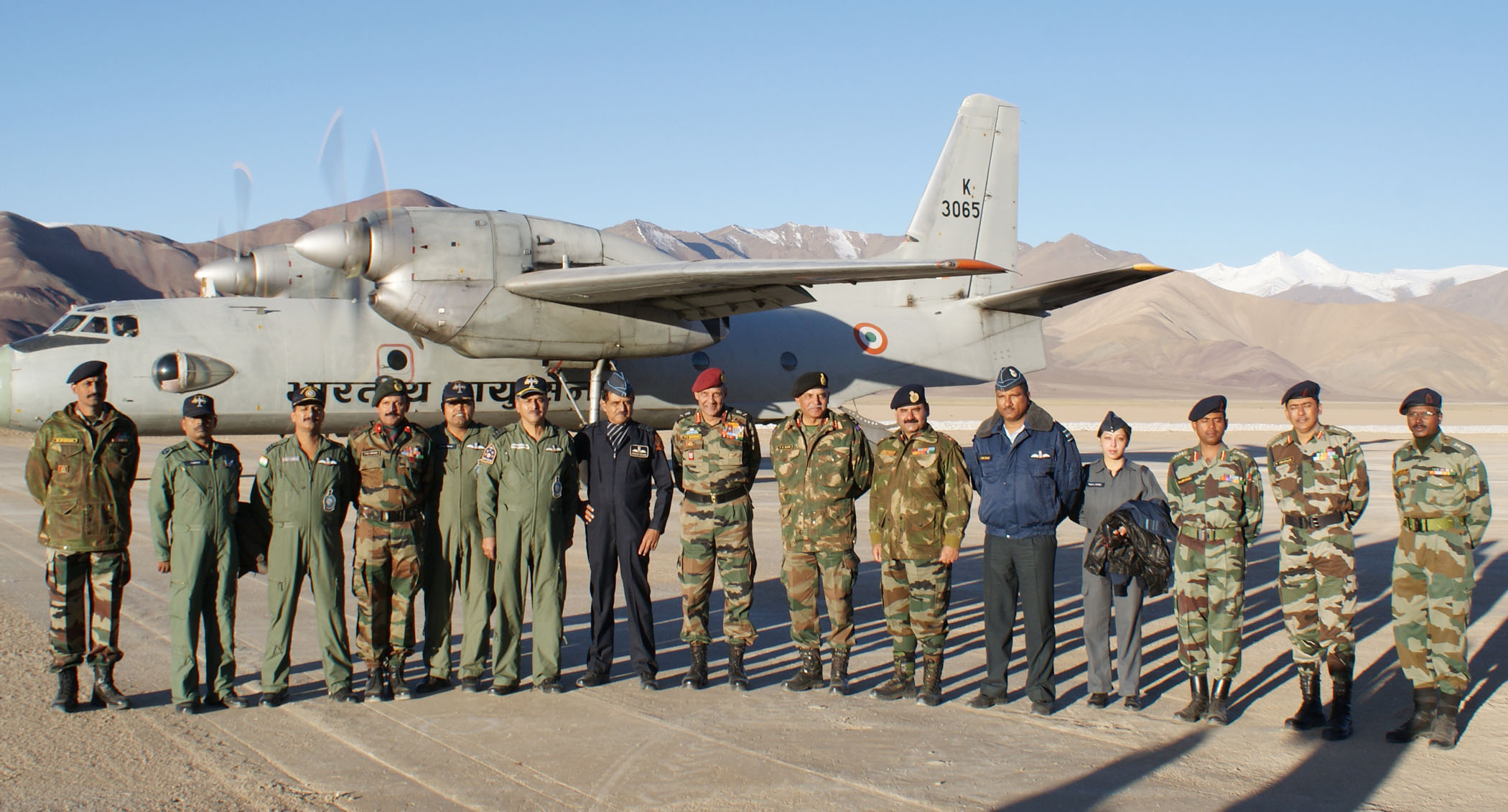
Indian Air Force officials at Nyoma Advanced Landing Ground

The Indian union-territory of Ladakh currently has only one airport meant for civilian flights, the Kushok Bakula Rimpochee Airport in Leh. The airport at Leh is jointly operated by the Airports Authority of India and the Indian Air Force. There is another airport at Kargil, but it is currently used for defence purposes only. Several airstrips have been built by the Indian Air Force in Ladakh in the past to improve connectivity and for security purposes. Since the start of 2020–2022 China–India skirmishes, the Government of India has pushed for improving the existing aviation infrastructure across Ladakh.

The new terminal at Kushok Bakula Rimpochee Airport is proposed to be opened in December 2022. There have been proposals to enable the Kargil Airport and Thoise Airport for handling commercial flights but there has not been significant progress.

== List ==
The list includes the airports in Ladakh with their respective ICAO and IATA codes.

List of airports in Ladakh
Sl. no.	Location in Ladakh	Airport name	ICAO	IATA	Operator	Category	Role
Domestic Airports
1	Leh	Kushok Bakula Rimpochee Airport	VILH	IXL	Airports Authority of India	Domestic airport	Commercial/Defence
Military Airbases
1	Chushul	Chushul ALG	none	none	Indian Air Force	Military airstrip	Defence
2	Daulat Beg Oldi	Daulat Beg Oldi ALG	none	none	Indian Air Force	Military airstrip	Defence
3	Fukche	Fukche ALG	VI66	none	Indian Air Force	Military airstrip	Defence
4	Kargil	Kargil Airport	VI65	none	Indian Air Force	Military airstrip	Defence
5	Nyoma	Nyoma ALG	none	none	Indian Air Force	Military airstrip	Defence
6	Tangtse	Tangtse ALG	none	none	Indian Air Force	Military airstrip (Proposed)	Defence
7	Thoise	Thoise ALG	VI57	none	Indian Air Force	Military airport	Defence
