= Matayen =

Matayen Matayan
- Village
- Location in Ladakh, India Matayen (India)
- Coordinates: 34.36°N 75.57°E
- Country: India
- Union Territory: Ladakh
- District: Drass
- Tehsil: Drass

Population (2011)
  - Total: 1,909

Languages
  - Official: Hindi, English
  - Spoken: Purgi, Kashmiri, Shina, Urdu
- Time zone: UTC+5:30 (IST)
- PIN: 194102

Matayen is a village in Drass tehsil in Drass district of the Indian union territory of Ladakh. The village is located around 21 kilometer's from drass.Its only village in ladakh where Kashmiri is spoken and Kashmiri peoples are being lived.

== Demographics ==
According to the 2011 census of India, Matayen had 239 households. The literacy rate of Matayen village is 62.86%. In Matayen, Male literacy stands at 62.86% while the female literacy rate was 49.36%.

Demographics (2011 Census)
	Total	Male	Female
Population	1909	967	942
Children aged below 6 years	257	-	-
Scheduled caste	0	0	0
Scheduled tribe	1869	-	-
Literacy	78.92%	88.46%	69.68%

== Transport ==
=== Road ===
Matayen is connected by road to other places in Ladakh and India by the NH1.

=== Rail ===
The nearest major railway stations to Matayen is Jammu Tawi railway station located at a distance of 386 kilometres.

=== Air ===
The nearest airport is located in Kargil at a distance of 89 kilometres but it is currently non-operational. The next nearest major airport is Srinagar International Airport located at a distance of 133 kilometres.

== See also ==
- Ladakh
- Kargil
- Drass
