= Mushkoh Valley =

- Hill station
- Location in Ladakh, India Mushkoh Valley (India)
- Coordinates: 34.43°N 75.66°E
- Country: India
- Union territory: Ladakh
- District: Drass

Languages
  - Official: Ladakhi, Urdu, Shina language
- Time zone: UTC+5:30 (IST)
- PIN: 194102
- Website: kargil.nic.in

The Mushkoh Valley is a valley situated in Dras. It is also known as valley of wild tulips, which are a major attraction for tourists. Located within Drass district in the Indian-administered union territory of Ladakh. Widely considered to be glaciated and unsuitable for human habitation, it came into prominence during the Kargil War in 1999, when Pakistani forces crossed the Line of Control and took up positions in the region. The Mushkoh Valley is situated at the westernmost extremity of Ladakh, to the west of which lies the northern reaches of the Kashmir Valley, located in the Indian-administered union territory of Jammu and Kashmir.

== Geography ==
The valley is nestled within Dras—the second-coldest inhabited place in the world. Dras, which is located approximately 141 kilometres (88 mi) from Srinagar, is also called 'The Gateway to Ladakh'.

The Mushkoh Valley is situated at an elevation of around 3,400 metres (11,000 ft), and is located just eight kilometres west from the main market in Dras. It has a population settled in a highland village surrounded by the mountains and meadow on all sides. The villagers are mostly involved in farming and sheep rearing.

== Transport and connectivity ==
The 130-kilometer road connecting the Gurez Valley to Mushkoh Valley in Kargil’s Drass Sector, connected by Kaobal Gali (4,166.9 metres, between Abdullum and Batokul), the highest pass in Gurez, is now open for off-roading tourists, offering a glimpse into the historic landscape of the Kargil War. These areas, once battlegrounds, hold significant importance in the Kargil conflict. In early 2025, high-speed public 4G/5G mobile and internet connectivity was made available by India.

== See also ==
- Geography of Ladakh
- Tourism in Ladakh
- Transport in Ladakh
