= Thasgam =

- Village
- Location in Ladakh, India Thasgam (India)
- Coordinates: 34.47°N 75.93°E
- Country: India
- Union Territory: Ladakh
- District: Drass
- Tehsil: Thasgam

Population (2011)
  - Total: 400

Languages
  - Official: Hindi, English
  - Spoken: Purgi, Shina, Urdu
- Time zone: UTC+5:30 (IST)
- PIN: 194103

Thasgam is a village and one of the tehsil in Drass district of the Indian union territory of Ladakh.

== Demographics ==
According to the 2011 census of India, Thasgam has 43 households. The literacy rate of Thasgam village is 70.70%. In Thasgam, male literacy stands at 84.57% while the female literacy rate was 55.92%.

Demographics (2011 Census)
	Total	Male	Female
Population	400	212	188
Children aged below 6 years	86	50	36
Scheduled caste	0	0	0
Scheduled tribe	398	210	188
Literacy	70.70%	84.57%	55.92%
Workers (all)	72	65	7
Main workers (all)	53	–	–
Marginal workers (total)	19	15	4

== Transport ==
=== Road ===
Thasgam is well-connected by road to other places in Ladakh and India by the Srinagar-Leh Highway or the NH 1.

=== Rail ===
The nearest railway station to Thasgam is the Srinagar railway station located at a distance of 190 kilometres.

=== Air ===
The nearest airport is at Kargil located at a distance of 45 kilometres but it is currently non-operational. The next nearest major airports are Srinagar International Airport and Leh Airport located at a distance of 188 kilometres and 251 kilometres.

== See also ==
- Ladakh
- Kargil
- Suru Valley
- Drass
