= Haripora =

Village in Drass district, Ladakh, India

- Village
- Location in Ladakh, India Haripora (India)
- Coordinates: 34.43°N 75.75°E
- Country: India
- Union territory: Ladakh
- District: Drass
- Tehsil: Dras
- Time zone: UTC+5:30 (IST)
- Vehicle registration: LA

Haripora is a village in the Drass district of the union territory of Ladakh, India. It is located in the Dras subdivision and forms one of the revenue villages of the district.

== Geography ==
Haripora is situated in the Drass Valley along the National Highway 1 corridor between Zoji La and Kargil. The village lies in the western part of Ladakh and experiences a cold mountainous climate typical of the Drass region.

== Administration ==
Haripora is administratively part of the Dras tehsil in Drass district. Prior to the creation of Drass district in 2026, the area formed part of Kargil district.

== Demographics ==
The population of Haripora mainly consists of Shina- and Purgi-speaking communities. Islam is the predominant religion in the village.

== See also ==
- Dras
- Drass district
- Kargil district
- Ladakh
