= Capital of Ladakh =

Capital of Ladakh may refer to:

- Kargil
- Leh
