= Drass district =

District of Ladakh, India

- District of Ladakh
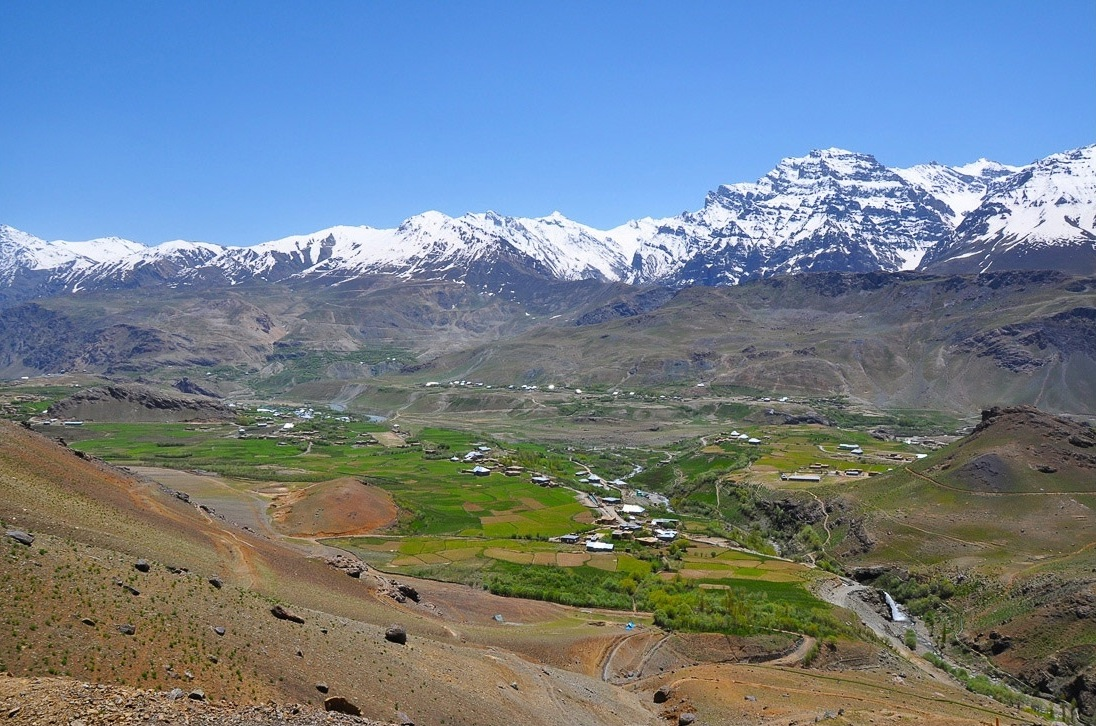
- View of Drass Valley
- Interactive map of Drass district
- Coordinates: 34°25′49.945″N 75°45′5.126″E
- Country: India
- Union Territory: Ladakh
- Headquarter: Drass-Ranbirpura
- Established: 27 April 2026

Government
  - Deputy Commissioner: Sh. Zahida Bano JKAS
  - Lok Sabha constituencies: Ladakh
  - MP: Mohmad Haneefa

Area
  - Total: 2,036 km^{2} (786 sq mi)

Population (2011)
  - Total: 21,998

Languages
  - Official: Hindi, English, Ladakhi, Urdu and Purgi
  - Spoken: Shina, Balti, Tibetan
- Time zone: UTC+05:30 (IST)

Drass district (called Gateway to Ladakh), with headquarter at Drass-Ranbirpura, is one of the district in the Union Territory of Ladakh in India. It is also one of the smallest districts in the country.

== History ==
In January 2024, hundreds of people from various villages in the region took part in a peaceful protest march, demanding that Drass be recognized as a district. Earlier announced on 26 August 2024 as a new district was awaiting the formal notification for the creation. On 27 April 2026, 5 new districts were notified in the government gazette for boosting the service delivery and infrastructure, including Drass district with 19 revenue villages which was carved out of western part of Kargil district.

The district was the key site of Kargil war.

== Geography ==
Dras in high-altitude Great Himalayas range at roughly 3,300 meters (10,800 feet) near the Zoji La Pass. A narrow, high-altitude valley (approx. 10,800 ft) surrounded by towering, rocky, and often barren Himalayan peaks. Dras acts as a critical link between Kashmir and Ladakh, featuring significant military presence near the India-Pakistan Line of Control.

== Climate ==
Dras district has harsh continental climate conditions, including temperatures dropping below -40 °C in winter. The severe winters last from late autumn to spring (mid-October to mid-May) and receives significant snowfall (often over 550 mm water equivalent). Dras River flows through the region.

== Ecology ==
Dras is often called the "Indian Siberia" due to its frigid, icy conditions, similar to Siberia or Alaska. Vegetation is largely confined to river valleys at lower elevations, consisting mainly of hardy grasses and shrubs, as high-altitude areas are barren and rocky.

== Administration ==
Sub–divisions, Blocks and Villages in Drass district
Current district	Sub-division	Tehsil	Development Blocks	Villages
Drass district	Drass	Drass	Drass	Drass, Matayeen, Pandrass, Trongion, Haripora, Batokol, Mushkoo, Holiyal, Muradbagh, Goshan
Drass district	Drass	Drass	Bhimbat	Bhimbat, Chowkiyal, Gindiyal, Throungos, Youlboo
Drass district	Drass	Thasgam	Thasgam	Jasgound, Thasgam, Shimsha, Kharboo
Total	1	2	3	19

== Demographics ==
Based on the population of the erstwhile Drass subdivision in the 2011 Census of India, the region corresponding to the present district had a population of 21,988. The district is predominantly rural and mountainous, with Drass serving as its administrative headquarters. The population consists mainly of Shina-speaking and Balti-speaking communities.

== Politics ==
=== Parliamentary Constituency ===
The district falls under Ladakh Lok Sabha constituency. The present Member of Parliament (MP) of Ladakh is Mohmad Haneefa (independent candidate).

=== Autonomous Hill Council ===
Drass District is administered by an elected body known as the Ladakh Autonomous Hill Development Council, Drass. The LAHDC was established in 2026.

== Tourism ==
Drass now serves as a key stopping point for travelers journeying to Leh and Kargil.

== Transport ==
=== Road ===
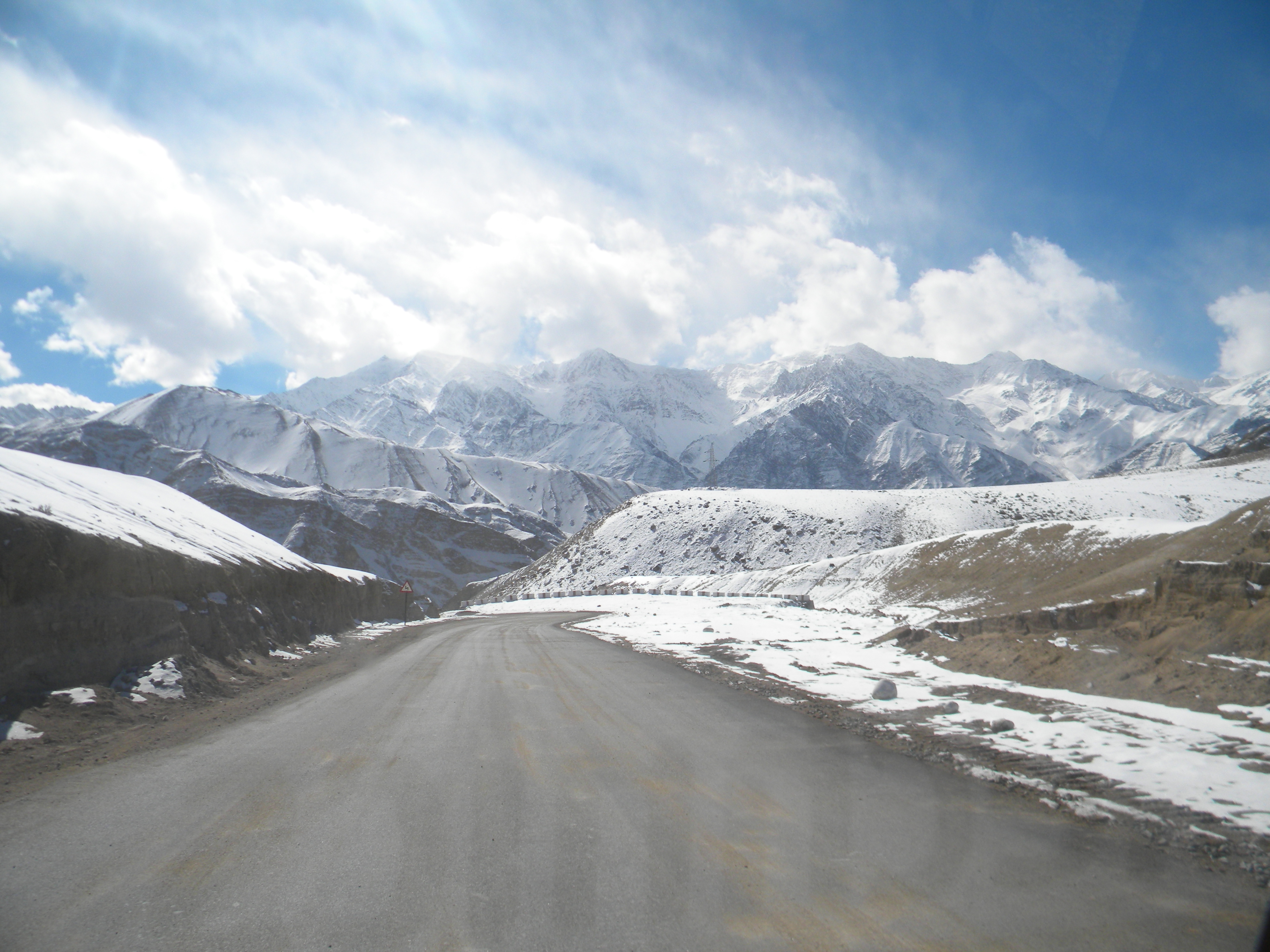
National highway NH 1 connects Srinagar and Leh via Kargil

Dras is situated along National Highway 1 (NH-1), about 60 km west of Kargil town and 140 km from Srinagar, serving as the gateway from the Kashmir Valley to Ladakh. National highway NH 1 runs through the district and connects Srinagar to Leh. Government operated buses provide local connectivity. The Kargil-Skardu road earlier linked Kargil to Skardu in Gilgit-Baltistan in Pakistan-administered Kashmir. It has been closed since the Indo-Pakistani war of 1947–1948.

=== Air ===
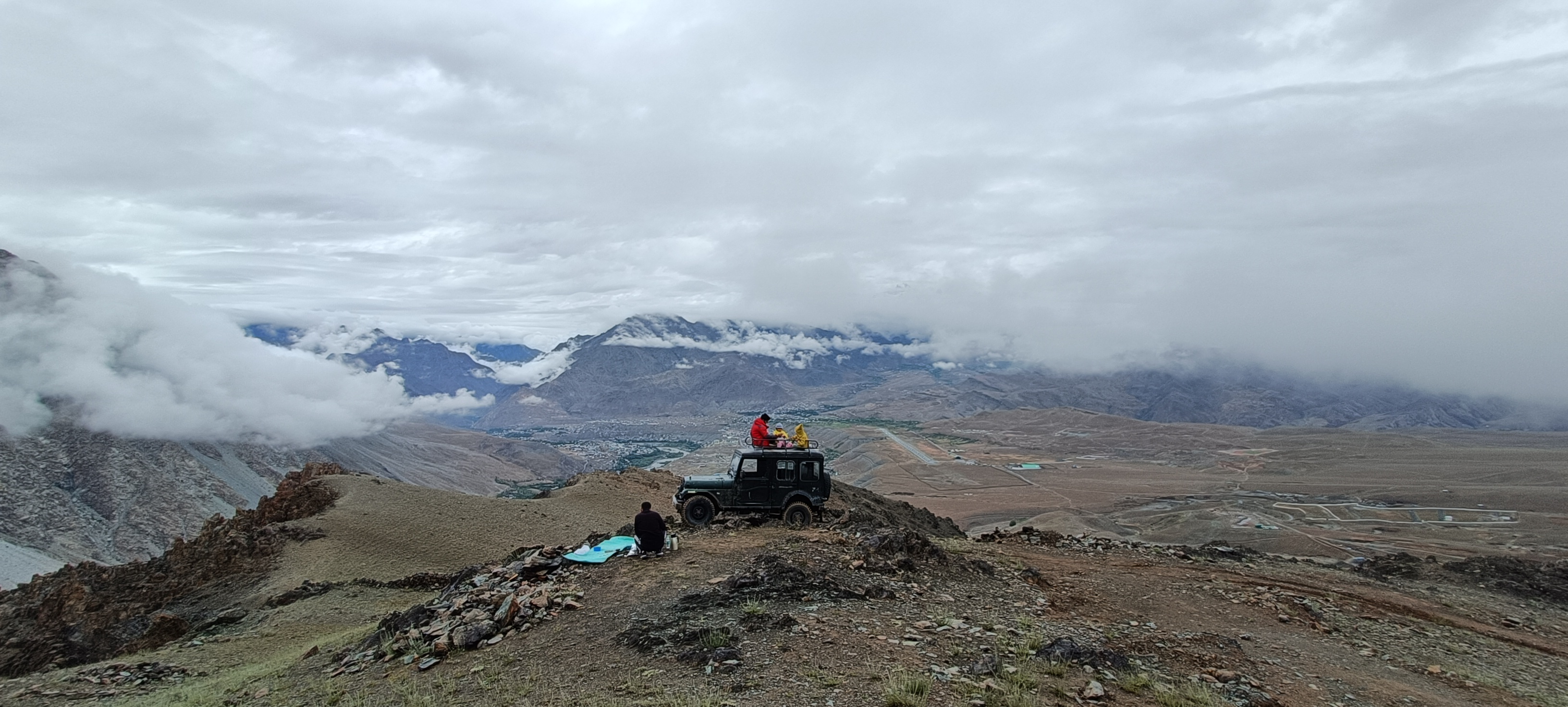
View of Kargil airport from Choskore La.

Kargil Airport was built in 1996 for civilian operations. The operational control was later transferred to the Indian Air Force. The air force operates seasonal flights that carry cargo and transport civilians during the winter. The nearest major airports are the Leh Airport with regular domestic flights and the Srinagar International Airport.

=== Rail ===
Srinagar railway station is the nearest railway station from the town, and has limited railway services. The nearest major railhead is the Jammu Tawi railway station located about 440 km (270 mi) from the town.

== See also ==
- List of districts of Ladakh
- Geography of Ladakh
- Tourism in Ladakh
