= Kargil War Memorial =

Indian memorial in Ladakh

Coordinates: 34°26′00″N 75°48′21″E

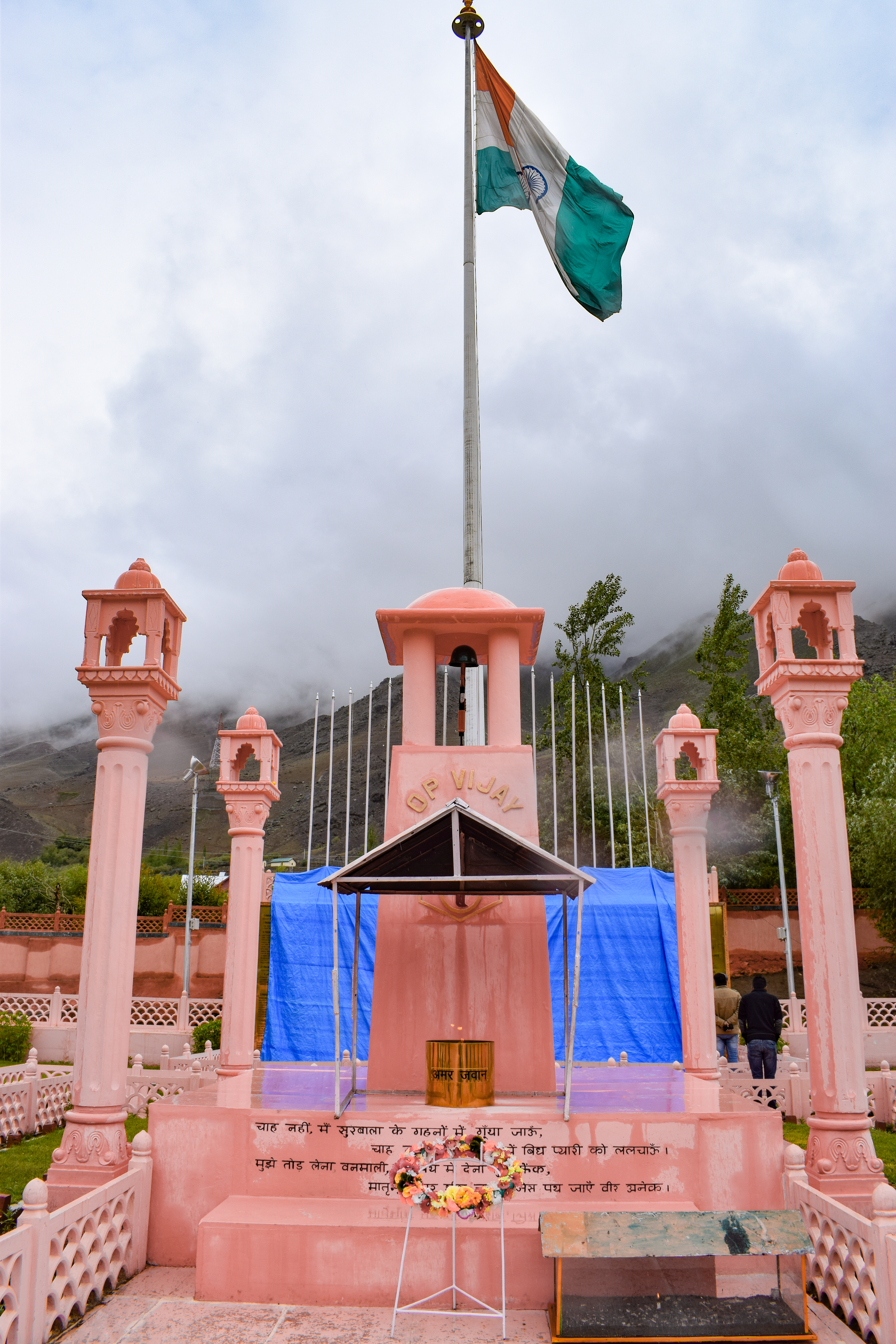
Kargil War Memorial. On the background is the name of soldiers who died during the battle, and a memorial for them in the front.

The Kargil War Memorial, also known as Dras War Memorial, is a war memorial built by the Indian Army in the town of Dras, near Kargil city in Kargil district of Ladakh, India, commemorating the 1999 Kargil War between India and Pakistan. The memorial is located on the Srinagar-Leh National Highway 1D, about 5 km from the city centre across the Tiger Hill, Kargil.

== History ==
In the winter of 1998–99, the Pakistani Army crossed the Line of Control (LoC) and occupied numerous heights in Indian State of Jammu and Kashmir. Pakistani forces were dominating the National Highway and roads connecting Leh (Ladakh) and Kargil to Srinagar. The Indian Army launched Operation Vijay ("Victory") in May 1999 to retake the territory, leading to fierce battles in the harsh mountain environment. The operation continued for over two months, leading to a stalemate, and eventual withdrawal of Pakistani troops on the intervention and instructions of USA, to avoid full-scale war between two nuclear states and for ensuring regional peace.

Each year, 26 July is observed by India as Kargil Vijay Diwas (Kargil Victory Day), during which the Prime Minister of India pays tribute to the soldiers at Amar Jawan Jyothi at the India Gate, New Delhi.

A makeshift memorial is said to have been constructed by troops of 108 Engineer Regiment at the site to honor Indian troops in 2000. The memorial in its present form was constructed by the Indian Army in November 2014.

== Design ==
The central feature of the memorial is a pink sandstone wall bearing a brass plate engraved with names of the soldiers who died during Operation Vijay. Visible from the site are the Tololing Heights, Tiger Hill, and Point 4875 (Batra Top), where fighting took place during the conflict.

The memorial features the Captain Manoj Pandey gallery, which commemorates a young officer who was posthumously awarded the Param Vir Chakra, India's highest military award, for leadership during the war.

Over the years, several infrastructural improvements have been made to the site. On 26 July 2012, the Flag Foundation of India presented to the memorial a giant national flag measuring 11.4 by 7.6 metres (37 1/2 by 25 ft) and weighing 15 kg, on a 30-metre (100 ft) flag pole. The Dras War Memorial is now an important landmark and a major tourist attraction in Western Ladakh—in the year 2016, it received about 1,25,000 visitors.

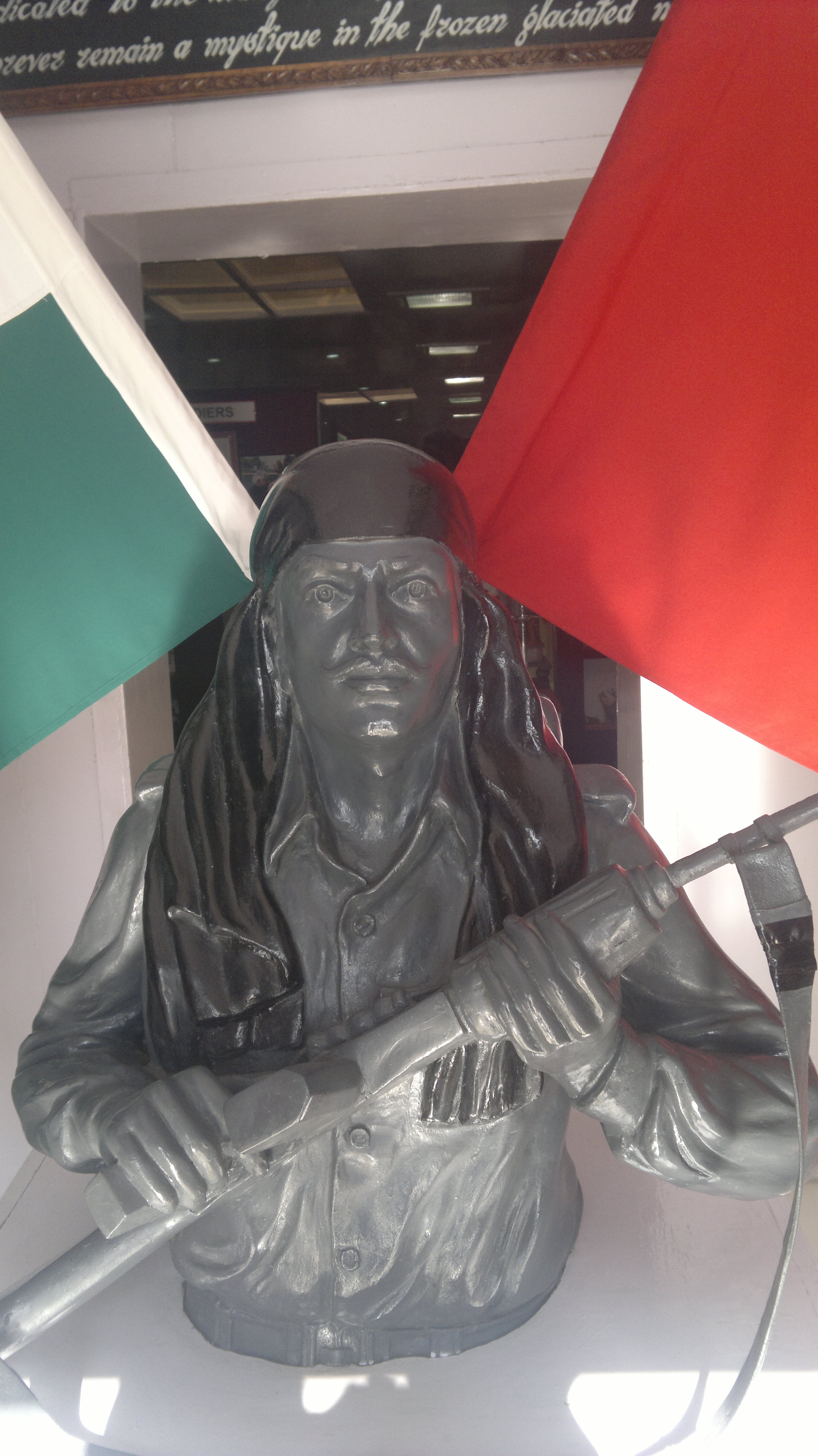
Image installed at the Kargil War Memorial, Dras

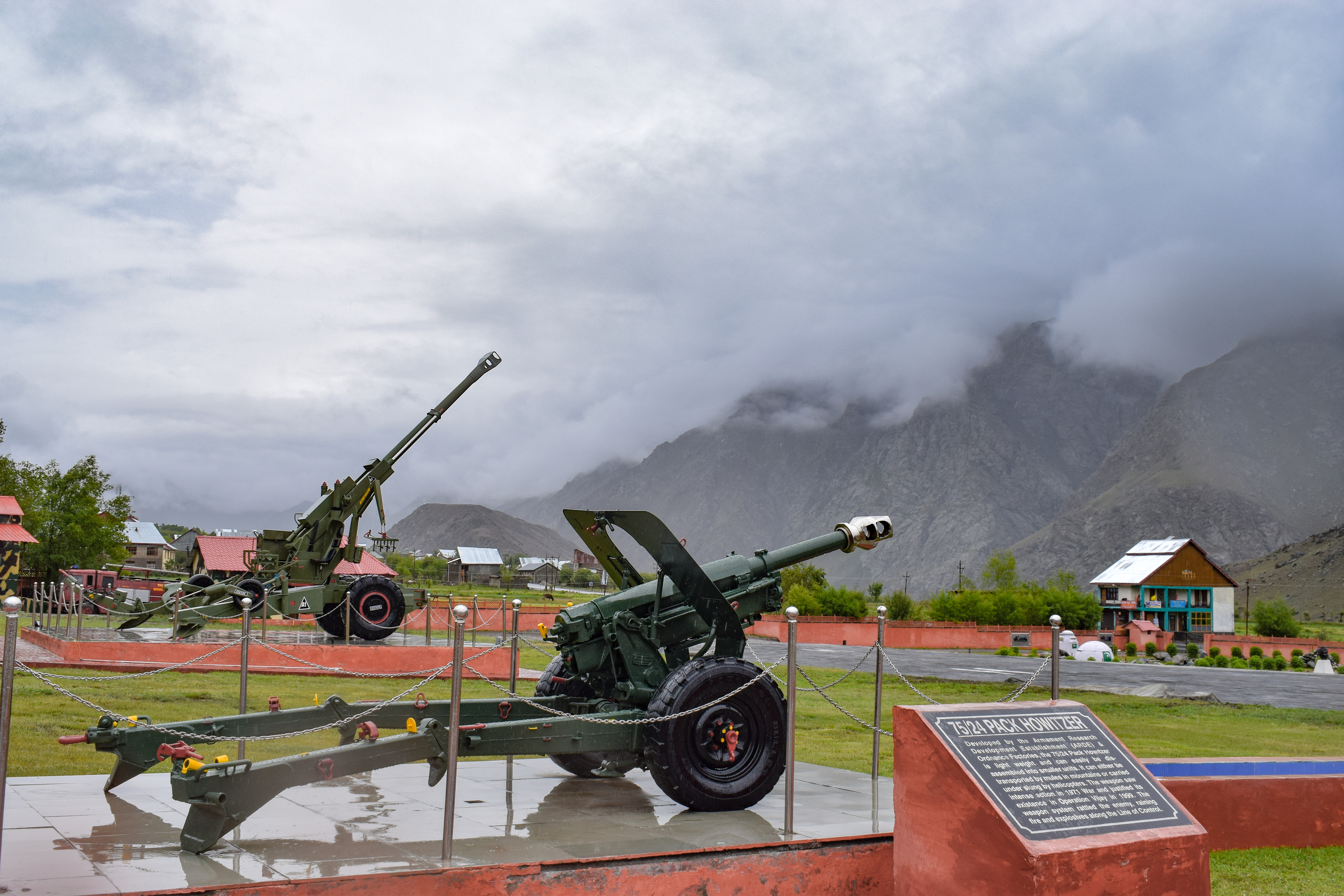
Artillery pieces at the Kargil War Memorial, Dras
