= Shilikchey =

- Village
- Interactive map of Shilikchey
- Location within Ladakh Location within Kashmir Location within India
- Coordinates: 34°35′07″N 76°07′35″E
- Country: India
- Union Territory: Ladakh
- District: Kargil
- Tehsil: Kargil

Government
  - Type: Ladakh Autonomous Hill Development Council, Kargil

Area
  - Total: 60.3 km^{2} (23.3 sq mi)

Population (2011)
  - Total: 1,006
  - Density: 16.7/km^{2} (43.2/sq mi)

Others
- Time zone: UTC+5:30 (IST)
- PIN: 194103
- Vehicle registration: LA 02
- Census code: 973
- Official languages: Hindi, Purgi, Ladakhi, English
- Other spoken: Shina, Balti

Shilikchey (Alternative spellings: Shilikche and Shilikchay) is a village in Kargil district of the Union territory of Ladakh in India. It is located 5 km away from the Kargil Town, on the right bank of the Suru River. According to 2009 stats, Shelikchey is the gram panchayat of Shilikchey village.

The total geographical area in which this village is expanded is 60.3 hectares. Shilikchey has a total population of 1,006 people. There are about 134 families residing in Shilikchey village. Kargil is the nearest town to Shilikchey which is nearly 5 km away.
