= Air Mantra =

IATA	ICAO	Call sign
M1	—	MANTRA
- Founded: 2011; 15 years ago
- Commenced operations: 2012; 14 years ago
- Ceased operations: 2013; 13 years ago
- Operating bases: Chandigarh
- Fleet size: 2
- Destinations: 4
- Headquarters: New Delhi, India
- Website: Archive

Air Mantra was a regional airline headquartered in New Delhi, India, that operated domestic flights between July 2012 and April 2013.

== History ==
Air Mantra was founded in 2011 by Indian conglomerate Religare Group (which had operated an air charter branch in 2006), in order to get a grip on the airline market in northern India. The initial growth plan saw the acquisition of ATR 72 and Bombardier Q400 aircraft.

Revenue flights were launched on 23 July 2012. The initial two daily flights between Chandigarh and Amritsar were operated using a fleet of two Beechcraft-1900 D aircraft. Eight months later, on 31 March 2013, all operations were suspended due to poor bookings, and the company was subsequently liquidated.

== Destinations ==
Air Mantra offered scheduled flights to the following destinations:

- Amritsar - Amritsar Airport
- Chandigarh - Chandigarh Airport
- Dehra Dun - Jolly Grant Airport
- New Delhi - New Delhi Airport

== Fleet ==
The airline operated two Beechcraft 1900D aircraft which seated 12 passengers and three crew.
