= Dras =

Dras Ranbirpura
- Town
- Drass
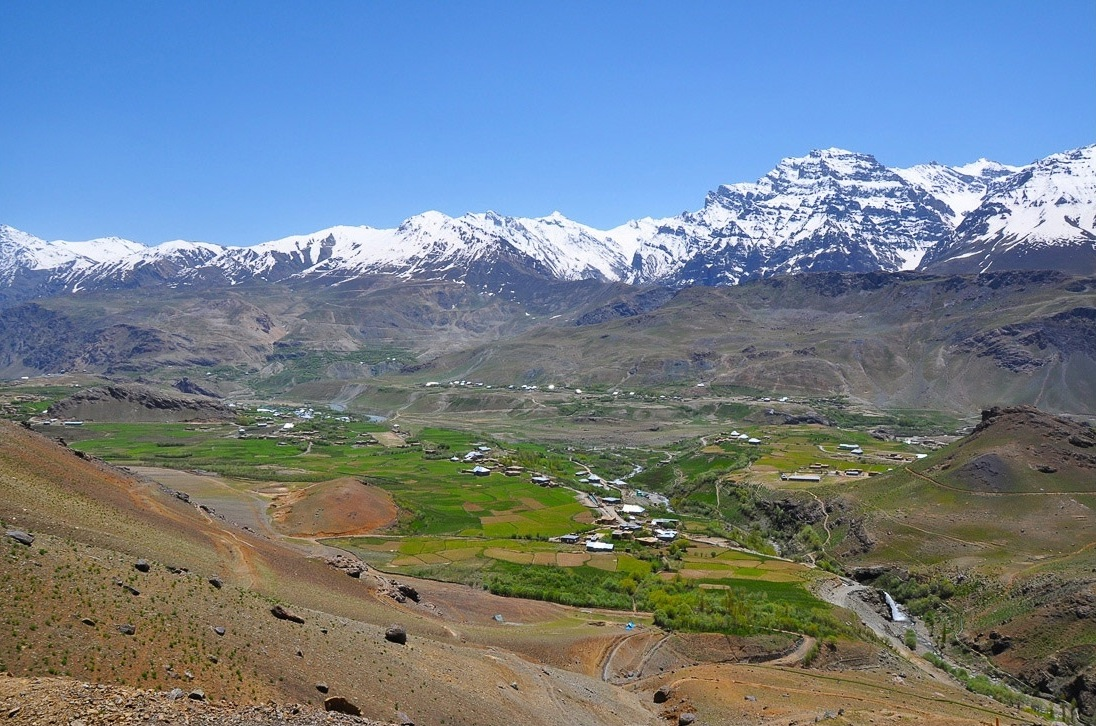
- View of Dras in Drass district, Ladakh (India)
- Nickname: The Gateway to Ladakh
- Interactive map of Dras
- Location in Ladakh, India Dras (India)
- Coordinates: 34°25′49.945″N 75°45′5.126″E
- Country: India
- Union Territory: Ladakh
- District: Drass
- Tehsil: Drass

Government
  - Type: Autonomous Hill Development Council
  - Body: LAHDC, Drass
- Elevation: 3,300 m (10,800 ft)

Population
  - Total: 8,397

Languages
  - Spoken: Shina, Balti, Urdu, Purgi
- Time zone: UTC+5:30 (IST)
- PIN: 194102
- Vehicle registration: LA-01
- Website: kargil.gov.in

Dras (also spelt Drass, ISO transliteration: Drās), also known locally as Himababs, Hembabs, or Humas, is a town, hill station and headquarters of eponymous tehsil and community development block in Drass district of the union territory of Ladakh in India. It is on the NH 1 between Zoji La pass and Kargil town. A tourist hub for its high-altitude trekking routes and tourist sites, it is often called "The Gateway to Ladakh". The government's official spelling of the town's name is "Drass".

== Etymology ==
Traditionally, Dras is known as Hem-babs, which means "snow land"; the word "Hem" means snow.

== History ==
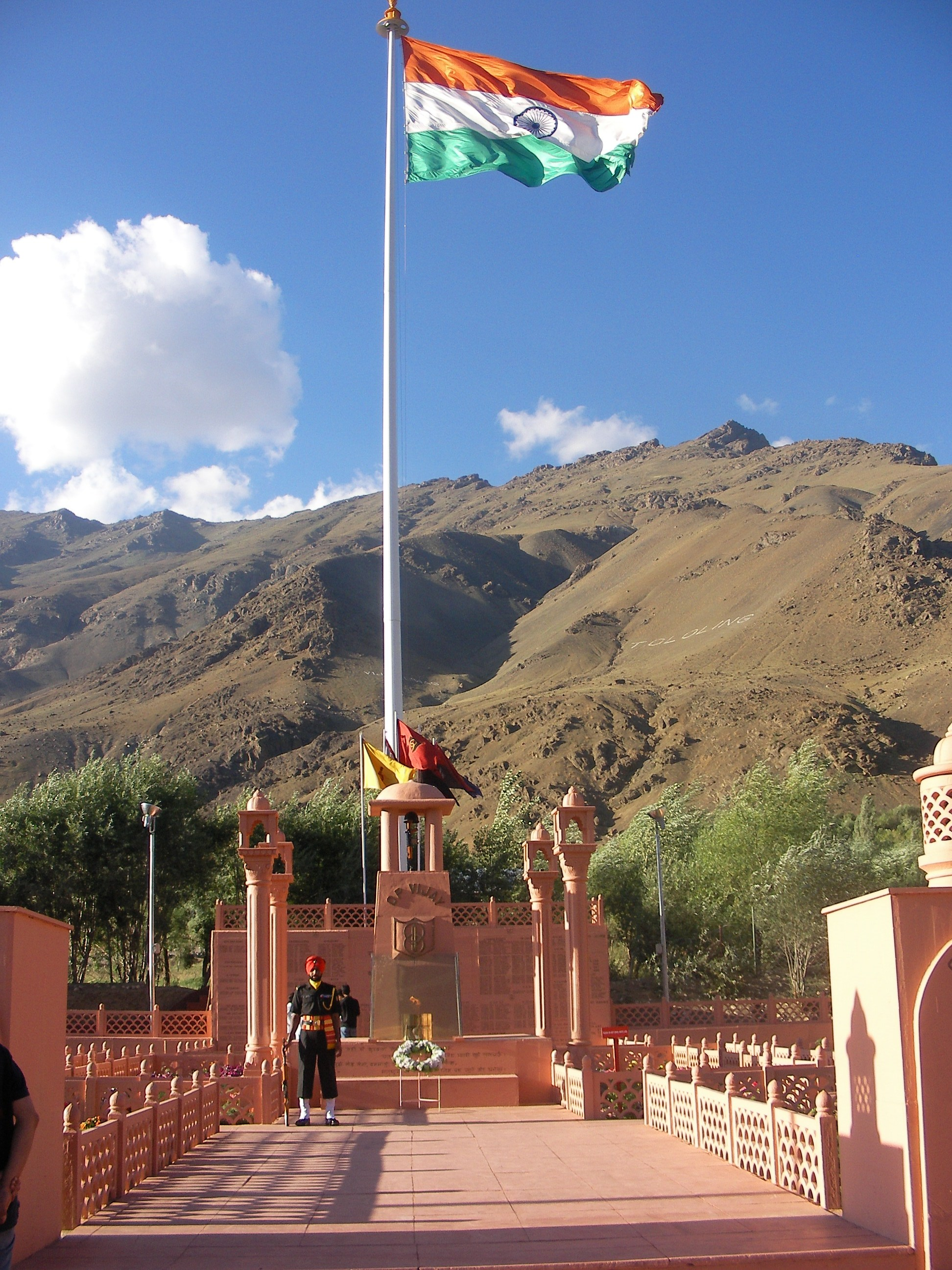
Dras War Memorial with Tololing Ranges in background

In the princely state of Jammu and Kashmir (1846–1947), Dras was part of the Kargil tehsil of the Ladakh wazarat.

During the invasion by Pakistan in 1947-48, the reinforced Gilgit Scouts, having gone over to Pakistan, attacked the Kargil area on 10 May 1948. The Indian army, by then in charge of defending Kashmir, sent reinforcements. However, they could not reach Dras in time and Dras fell to the Gilgitis on 6 June 1948. Kargil and Skardu also fell in short order. In November 1948, the Indian Army launched Operation Bison, supported by tanks, and retook Dras and Kargil. Skardu, however, remained under the control of Pakistan. The 1949 ceasefire line runs 12 km north of Dras through Point 5353.

The ceasefire line was renamed the Line of Control in the 1972 Simla Agreement, in which India and Pakistan agreed to respect the line without prejudice to their stated positions.

However, in the early months of 1999, Pakistani soldiers masquerading as mujahideen, infiltrated the area and took control of the peaks overlooking Dras and the highway, in particular Tololing, 4 km from Dras, and Tiger Hill, 8 km from Dras. They directed artillery fire at Dras and the highway, leading to the Kargil War. The Indian army cleared the Tololing and Tiger Hill peaks by July 1999.

== Geography ==
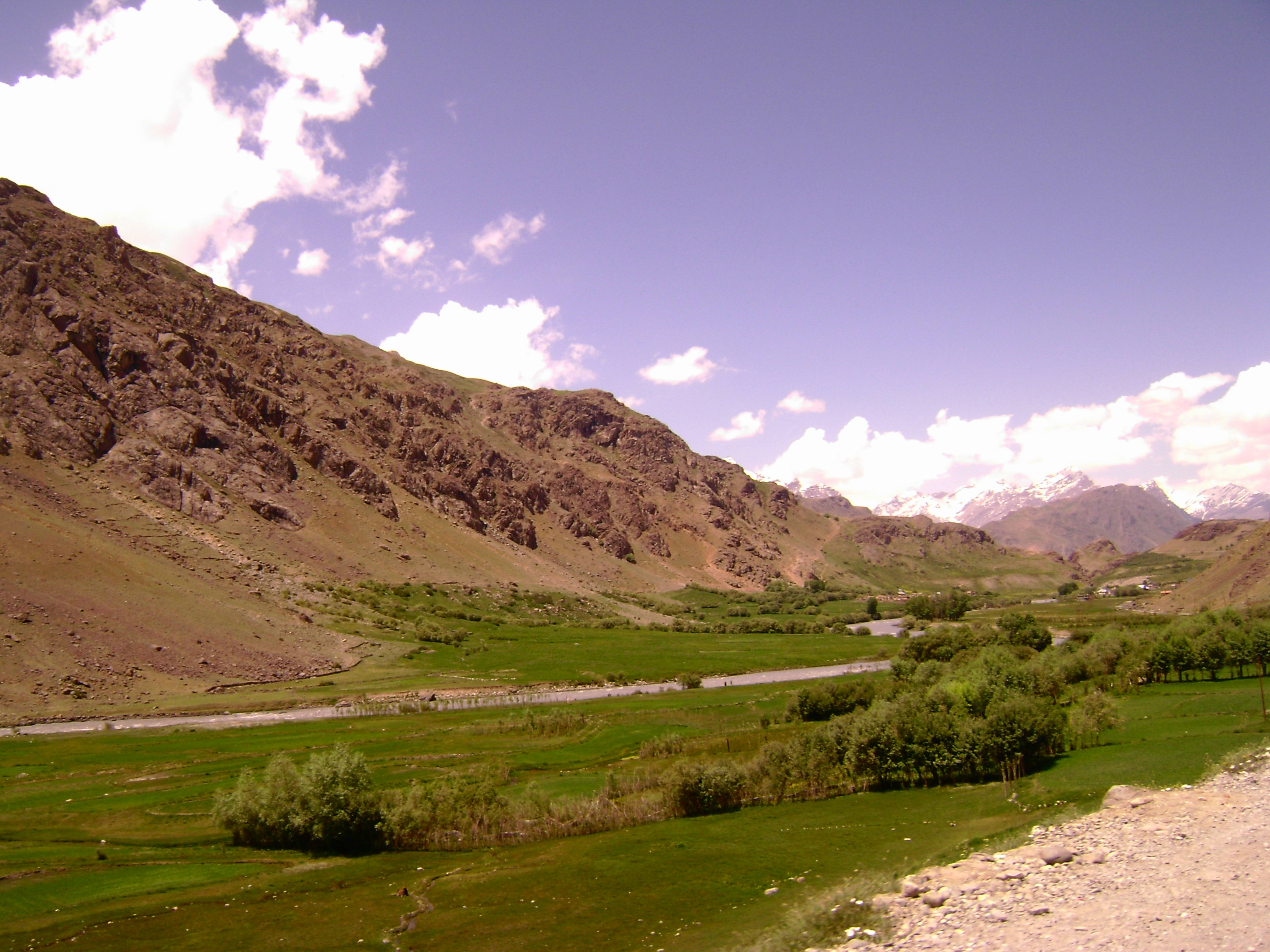
Dras Valley

The town of Dras lies in the centre of a valley of the same name, in the midst of the Great Himalayas range. It is at a height of 10,800 feet (3,300 m). Dras is 140 km from Srinagar and 63 km from Sonmarg. Kargil town is 58 km from Dras on the national highway NH 1 from Srinagar to Leh. Dras is often called "The Gateway to Ladakh".

=== Climate ===
Due to its location and elevation, Dras experiences an altitude-influenced Continental Mediterranean climate (Köppen climate classification: Dsb). It is considered one of, if not the coldest inhabited places in India. Winters are cold with average lows around −20 °C (−4 °F), and as low as −23 °C at the height of winter, which lasts from mid-October to mid-May. Summers start in June and go on up till early September, with average temperatures near 23 °C (74 °F) and little precipitation. Annual precipitation is almost entirely concentrated from December to May when Dras gets around 550 millimetres (21.7 in) water equivalent of snowfall.

Dras

Climate chart (precipitation, max. and min. temperature)
J	F	M	A	M	J	J	A	S	O	N	D
97 −8 −23	100 −6 −22	137 −1 −15	104 5 −6	61 14 1	22 21 6	15 24 9	16 24 10	18 20 5	20 13 −1	33 4 −10	53 −3 −19
- █ Average max. and min. temperatures in °C
- █ Precipitation totals in mm
- Source: Weatherbase
Imperial conversion
J	F	M	A	M	J	J	A	S	O	N	D
3.8 18 −9	3.9 21 −8	5.4 30 5	4.1 41 21	2.4 57 34	0.9 70 43	0.6 75 48	0.6 75 50	0.7 68 41	0.8 55 30	1.3 39 14	2.1 27 −2
- █ Average max. and min. temperatures in °F
- █ Precipitation totals in inches

Climate data for Dras
Month	Jan	Feb	Mar	Apr	May	Jun	Jul	Aug	Sep	Oct	Nov	Dec	Year
Record high °C (°F)	5 (41)	6 (43)	10 (50)	18 (64)	25 (77)	30 (86)	33 (91)	31 (88)	29 (84)	25 (77)	15 (59)	9 (48)	33 (91)
Mean daily maximum °C (°F)	−8.8 (16.2)	−6.5 (20.3)	−1.3 (29.7)	5.5 (41.9)	14.4 (57.9)	21.6 (70.9)	24.0 (75.2)	24.3 (75.7)	20.4 (68.7)	13.6 (56.5)	4.0 (39.2)	−3.5 (25.7)	9.0 (48.2)
Daily mean °C (°F)	−16.4 (2.5)	−14.5 (5.9)	−8.4 (16.9)	−0.7 (30.7)	7.8 (46.0)	13.8 (56.8)	17.0 (62.6)	17.2 (63.0)	12.8 (55.0)	6.1 (43.0)	−3.3 (26.1)	−10.2 (13.6)	1.8 (35.2)
Mean daily minimum °C (°F)	−23.9 (−11.0)	−22.4 (−8.3)	−15.5 (4.1)	−6.9 (19.6)	1.1 (34.0)	6.0 (42.8)	9.9 (49.8)	10.0 (50.0)	5.2 (41.4)	−1.4 (29.5)	−10.5 (13.1)	−16.8 (1.8)	−5.4 (22.2)
Record low °C (°F)	−42 (−44)	−43 (−45)	−33 (−27)	−25 (−13)	—	−8 (18)	−5 (23)	−5 (23)	−5 (23)	−20 (−4)	−29 (−20)	−45 (−49)	−45 (−49)
Average precipitation mm (inches)	33.1 (1.30)	56.1 (2.21)	44.6 (1.76)	36.6 (1.44)	30.3 (1.19)	6.7 (0.26)	18.3 (0.72)	59.0 (2.32)	7.4 (0.29)	17.6 (0.69)	54.7 (2.15)	40.9 (1.61)	405.3 (15.94)
Average precipitation days (≥ 2.5 mm)	2.4	3.0	3.4	2.2	3.0	0.7	1.0	0.9	0.8	0.7	2.7	2.4	23.2
Source 1:
Source 2: Precipitation

== Demographics ==
According to the 2011 Census of India, the village named Rambirpur (Drass) recorded a population of 8397 spread across roughly 404 households.

Demographics of Rambirpur (Drass) (2011 Census)
Parameter	Total	Male	Female
Population	8397	7758	639
Children (0–6 years)	196	105	91
Literacy Rate	96.87%	98.31%	76.64%
Scheduled Tribes	1041	528	513

=== Ethnicity ===
The major ethnic groups are the Shina people, who speak the Indo-Aryan language Shina, and the Balti people, who speaks Balti, language, Balti belongs to the Tibetic group. Shina ethnic group forms majority of the population at around 60-70% while the Balti and Purgi ethnic groups are a significant minority making up around 30-40% of the population. The local population is 64% male and 36% female. In total the population of Dras per the 2011 Census is 21988. Out of this, 14,731 are males while 7,257 are females. This block has 2,767 kids in the age bracket of 0–6 years. Among them 1,417 are boys and 1,350 are girls.

=== Religion ===
The population is 99% Muslim. The Shina people are mostly Sunni making up around 65-75% of the population while the Balti people are mostly Shias forming 25-35% of the population. The Kashmiris are a very small minority and are Sunni Muslims. Islam first arrived to the region due to the influence of Kashmiri merchants. Drass is the only area (now a district) in Ladakh where Sunni Muslims comprise the majority of the population.

== Culture ==
Many inhabitants of Dras cultivate primary crops like barley. The locals also raise livestock like cattle and ponies.

Common foods in the diet of the people include potatoes, barley, lamb, mutton and drinks like tea. Polo is a very popular pastime in Dras.

== Tourism ==
Dras has been developed as a tourist destination since 1999, following the Kargil War, when visitors came to see the war zone. The 130-km road connecting the Gurez Valley to Mushkoh Valley in Kargil’s Drass Sector, connected by Kaobal Gali (4,166.9 metres, between Abdullum and Batokul), the highest pass in Gurez, is now open for tourists, offering a glimpse into the historic landscape of the Kargil War. These areas, once battlegrounds, hold significant importance in the Kargil conflict. The Kargil War Memorial is 7 km from Dras. Dras is located on NH-1 Srinagar-Dras-Kargil-Leh highway.

In early 2025, high-speed public 4G/5G mobile and internet connectivity was made available by India.

== See also ==
- Geography of Ladakh
- Tourism in Ladakh
- Transport in Ladakh

== Bibliography ==
- Cheema, Brig Amar (2015), The Crimson Chinar: The Kashmir Conflict: A Politico Military Perspective, Lancer Publishers, pp. 51–, ISBN 978-81-7062-301-4
- Karim, Maj Gen Afsir (2013), Kashmir The Troubled Frontiers, Lancer Publishers LLC, pp. 30–, ISBN 978-1-935501-76-3
