= Kargil Airport =

Military airport in Kargil, Ladakh, India

- IATA: none; ICAO: VI65

Summary
- Airport type: Military
- Owner: Airport Authority of India, Administration of Ladakh
- Operator: Indian Air Force
- Serves: Kargil
- Location: Kargil, Ladakh, India
- Elevation AMSL: 2,927 m / 9,604 ft
- Coordinates: 34°31′22″N 076°09′18″E

Map
- Location of the airport in Ladakh Kargil Airport (India)

Runways
Direction	Length		Surface
Direction	m	ft	Surface
02/20	1,830	6,004	Asphalt

Kargil Airport (ICAO: VI65) is a military airfield in Kargil district 6 km (3.7 mi) away from Kargil and 217 km (135 mi) from Leh. It is one of two airports in the union territory of Ladakh. The airport will be expanded for operation of commercial jets by the end of 2024.

== History ==
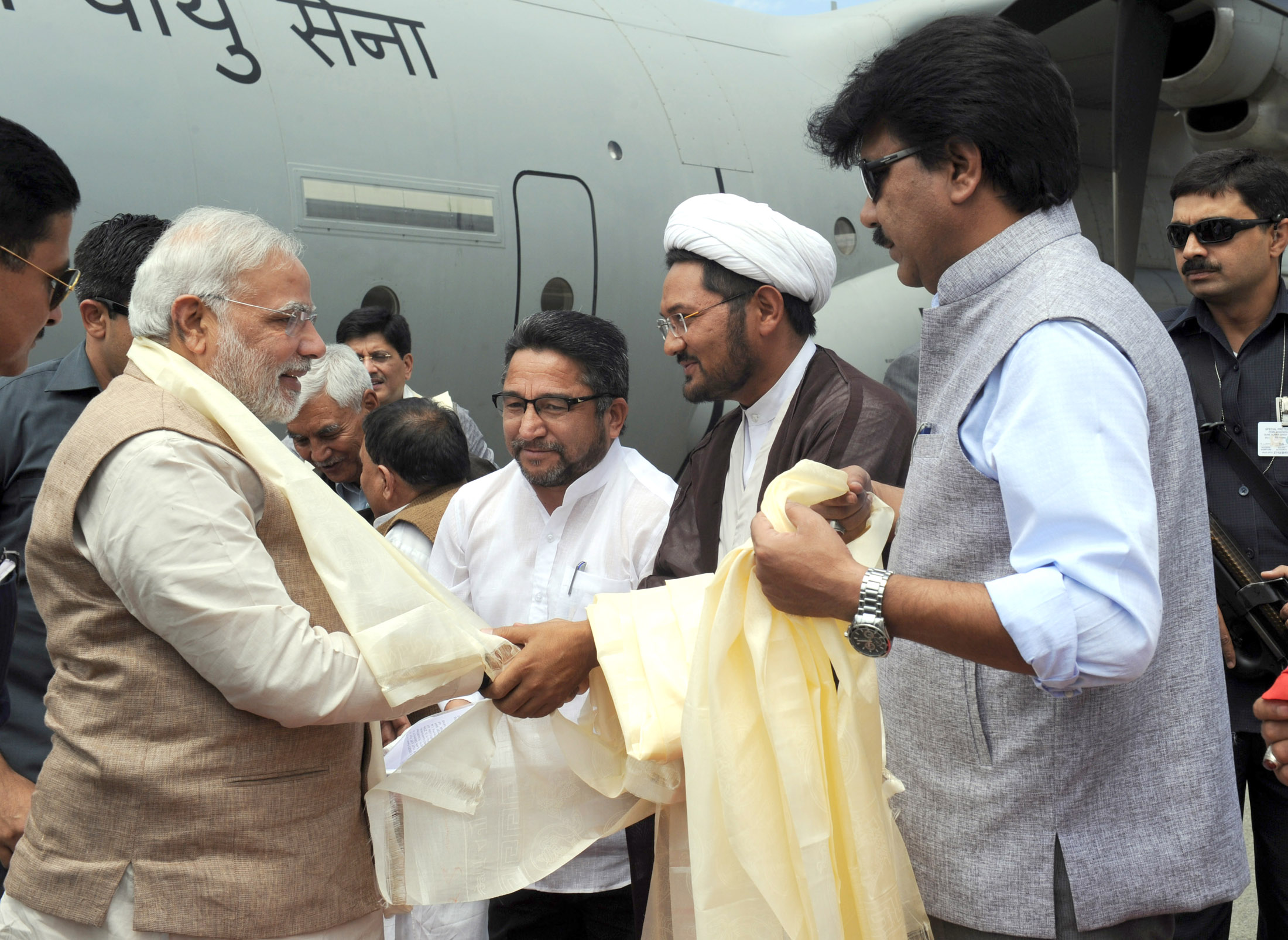
Indian prime minister Narendra Modi being received by local leaders on his arrival at Kargil Airport on 12 August 2014

The airport was built by the State Government of Jammu and Kashmir in 1996 for civilian operations. and was leased to the Airports Authority of India (AAI). Kargil rose to prominence in the late 1990s as the site of an undeclared war between India and Pakistan. AAI transferred the operational control and maintenance to Indian Air Force (IAF) because the airport was vulnerable to shelling by Pakistani forces.

The civil enclave at the airfield is managed by the state government. The terminal building has the capacity to handle 100 peak hour passengers at a time. It was built by the Airports Authority of India (AAI) at a cost of 350 million Rupees, initially for civilian use but was transferred to the Indian Air Force (IAF) in 2003 after it was damaged in the Kargil War in 1999.

The Air Force operates its An-32 aircraft from for an air courier service that transports civilians from Kargil to Srinagar and Jammu during the harsh winter season.

The airport is a much debated issue for local politicians as well as the public who pursue the point that the airport should be opened to commercial civilian services. Air Mantra became the first commercial company to land a civilian aircraft at the airport when it landed a 17-seater aircraft with dignitaries, including then Chief Minister of the state Omar Abdullah, on board in January, 2012. However, the service could not be sustained.

The Jammu and Kashmir government sanctioned ₹ billion to upgrade the airport to handle commercial flights. A pre-feasibility study was conducted by the AAI in June 2019. The report recommended extending the existing 6,000-foot (1,800 m) runway by another 5,000 ft (1,500 m) in order to make it suitable for commercial jets.
