= Kushok Bakula Rimpochee Airport =

Airport serving Leh, Ladakh, India

Kushok Bakula Rimpochee Airport कुशोक बकुला रिम्पोची हवाई अड्डा ཀུ་ཤོག་བ་ཀུ་ལ་རིན་པོ་ཆེའི་གནམ་ཐང་། کشوک بکولا رمپوچی ہوائی اڈہ
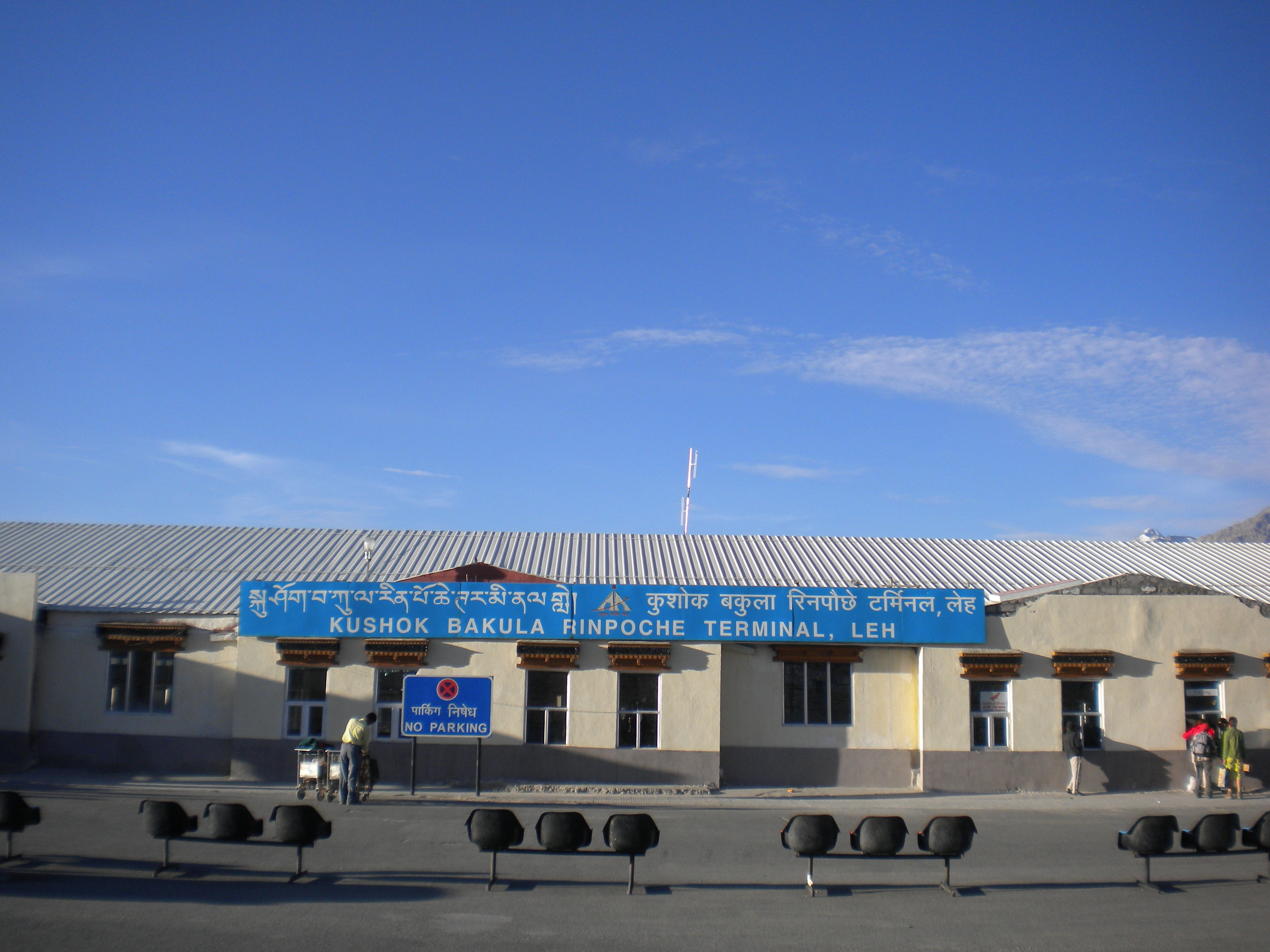
- IATA: IXL; ICAO: VILH

Summary
- Airport type: Public/Military
- Owner: Indian Air Force
- Operator: Airports Authority of India
- Serves: Leh
- Location: Leh, Ladakh, India
- Opened: 1985; 41 years ago
- Built: 1961; 65 years ago
- Time zone: IST (UTC+05:30)
- Elevation AMSL: 3,256 m (10,682 ft)
- Coordinates: 34°08′09″N 077°32′43″E
- Website: Leh Airport

Map
- Location of airport in Ladakh IXL (India)

Runways
Direction	Length		Surface
Direction	m	ft	Surface
07/25	2,752	9,028	Asphalt

Statistics (April 2025 - March 2026)
- Passengers: 10,70,313 (▼ -10.4%)
- Aircraft movements: 8,360 (▼ -3.8%)
- Cargo tonnage: 1,627.4 (▼ -14.8%)
- Source: AAI

Kushok Bakula Rimpochee Airport (IATA: IXL, ICAO: VILH) is a domestic airport as well as a military airfield of the Indian Air Force serving Leh, the capital of Ladakh, India. Situated at 3,256 m (10,682 ft) above mean sea level, it is the highest commercial airport in India and one of the highest in the world. The airport is named after 19th Kushok Bakula Rinpoche, a Buddhist monk whose Spituk Monastery is in vicinity to the airfield. Due to its location in between the Himalayas, the approach to the airport is one of the most challenging and scenic.

Beside the existing terminal, a new, larger terminal is being constructed to meet the rapidly rising traffic and demands. Its foundation stone was laid by Prime Minister Narendra Modi in February 2019, and construction began in the same month. Due to the COVID-19 pandemic, the project delayed because of labour shortage and restrictions. It is slated to be completed by October 2025. Upon completion of the new terminal, the airport will be the first hybrid airport in the nation powered by geothermal and solar energy together.

== History ==
The airport was established in 1961 as a military air-strip for landing of military transport aircraft of the Indian Air Force and other nations, such as the Lockheed C-130 Hercules and the Antonov AN-12, for supporting the troops of the Indian Army in the forward areas of Ladakh. Civilian flights began later, after the 1962 Indo-China War. A separate terminal building was constructed for handling civilian passengers in 1985. In 2016, the airport was to be handed over to Airports Authority of India, which will expand it for civilian use; however, the airport remains a premier and strategic airfield of the Indian Air Force. The Ministry of Defence clarified that a portion of land will be earmarked for a construction of a new terminal and the airport will continue to serve military flights. Situated at 3,256 m (10,682 ft) above mean sea level, it is the highest commercial airport in India and one of the highest in the world.

== Infrastructure ==
=== Terminal ===
In 2016, the Indian Air Force allocated 11 acres (4.5 ha) of land for the construction of a new civilian terminal. The new terminal covering an area of 19,000 m^{2} (200,000 sq ft) along with aerobridges was constructed at a cost of ₹2 billion (US$21 million).

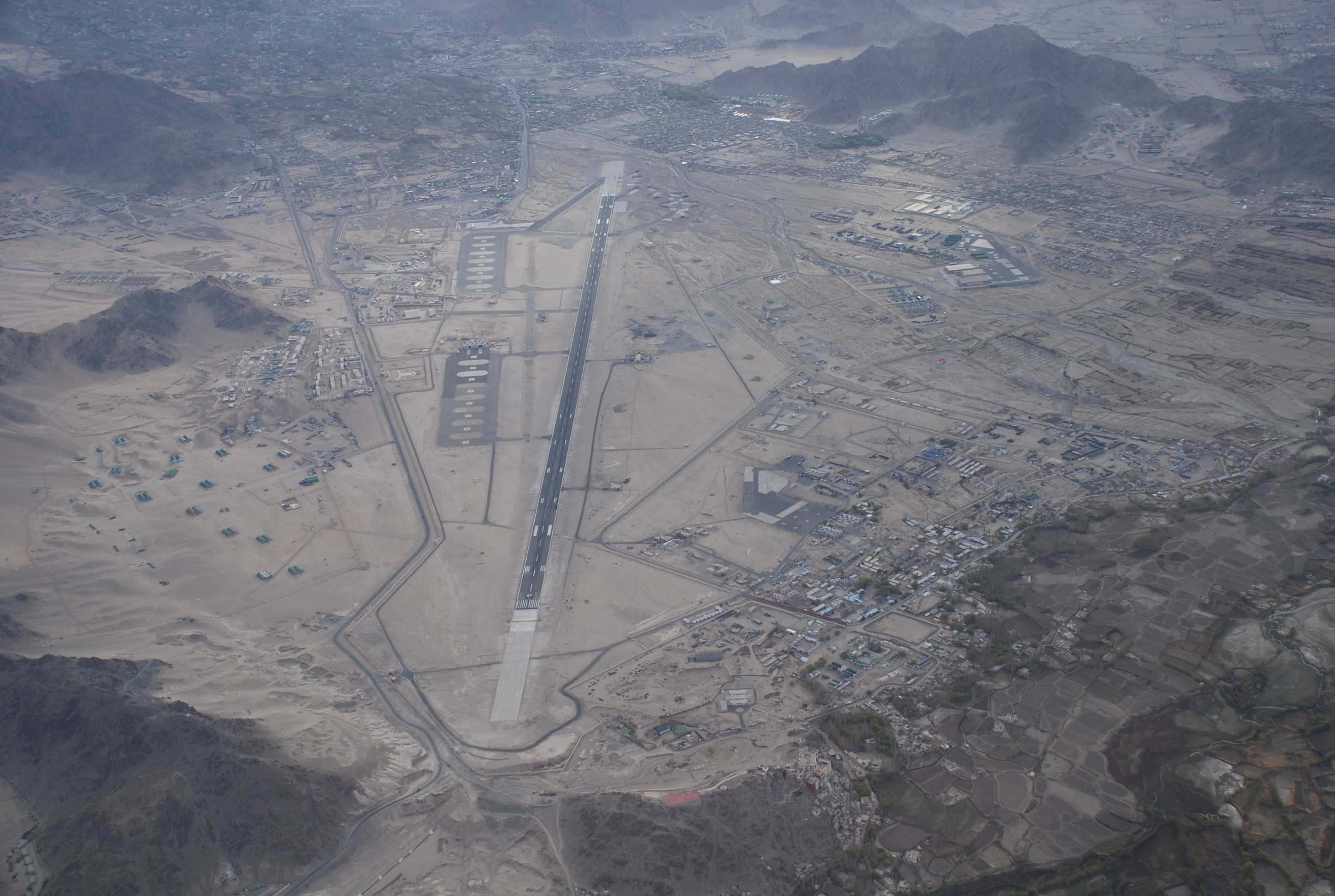
Aerial view of the airport. At 10,682 feet, it is the highest airport in India.

In 2019, the Airports Authority of India planned to construct a new passenger terminal beside the current terminal at a cost of ₹480 crore (US$50 million) to cater to increasing traffic. It would be equipped with all modern and essential passenger-friendly facilities, will have 18 check-in counters, in-line baggage handling system and would be capable of serving 2 million passengers per annum. Construction of the new terminal began in February 2019 and was expected to be completed by 2023. It is now slated to be completed by October 2025.

=== Runway ===
The airport has one asphalt runway of 9,036 ft (2,754 m) in length. Due to the presence of mountain winds in the afternoon, all flights operate in the morning and the approach is challenging as it is unidirectional with a higher terrain towards the eastern end of the airport. Due to its location in between the Himalayas, the approach to Leh Airport has been named as one of the world's most scenic approaches.

== Airlines and destinations ==
=== Passenger ===
Airlines	Destinations	Refs.
Air India	Chandigarh, Delhi, Jammu, Srinagar	
IndiGo	Chandigarh, Delhi, Jammu; Seasonal: Mumbai	
SpiceJet	Delhi; Seasonal: Mumbai	

=== Cargo ===
Airlines	Destinations	Refs.
SpiceXpress	Delhi	
