= Kargil =

Town in Ladakh, India-administered Kashmir

- Town and municipality
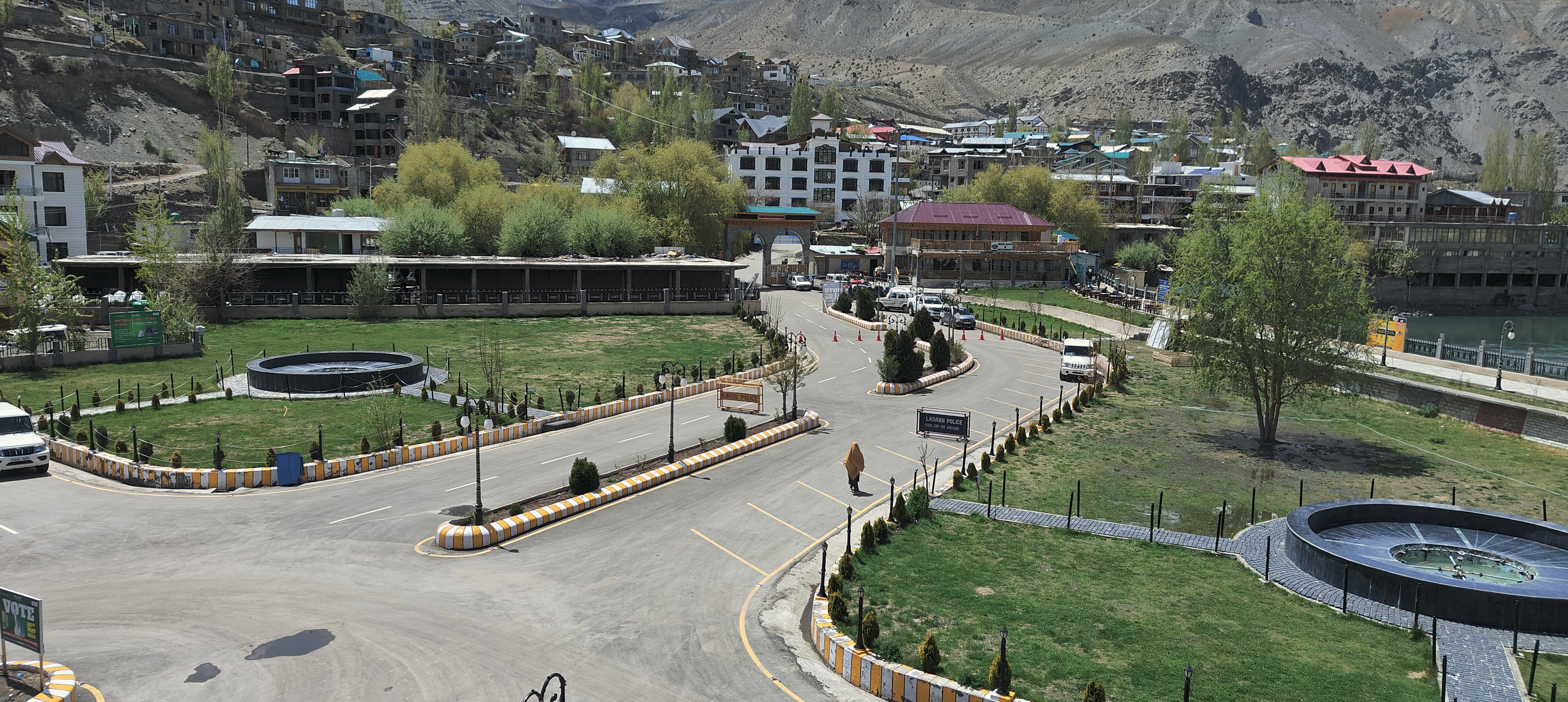
- Tourist Facilitation Centre at Bemathang, Kargil, Ladakh.
- Interactive map of Kargil
- Location in Ladakh, India Kargil (India)
- Coordinates: 34.5594°N 76.1256°E
- Administrating country: India
- Union territory: Ladakh
- District: Kargil
- Tehsil: Kargil
- Established: 1 July 1979

Government
  - Type: Municipality
  - Body: Ladakh Autonomous Hill Development Council, Kargil

Area
  - Total: 2.14 km^{2} (0.83 sq mi)
- Elevation: 2,676 m (8,780 ft)

Population (2011)
  - Total: 16,338
  - Density: 7,630/km^{2} (19,800/sq mi)

Languages
  - Official: Bhoti; Purgi; Urdu; Hindi; English
- Time zone: UTC+5:30 (IST)
- PIN: 194103
- Vehicle registration: LA 01
- Website: kargil.nic.in

Kargil (English: /ˈkɑrɡɪl/ KAR-ghil, Hindi: [kaːɾɡɪl]) or Kargyil is a city and headquarter of the eponymous district, tehsil, and community development block of Indian-administered Ladakh in the disputed Kashmir region. It is the joint capital of Ladakh, an Indian-administered union territory, and the headquarters of the Kargil district. It is the second-largest urban centre in Ladakh after Leh. Kargil is located 204 kilometres (127 mi) east of Srinagar in Jammu and Kashmir, and 234 kilometres (145 mi) to the west of Leh. It is on the bank of the Suru River near its confluence with the Wakha Rong River, the latter providing the most accessible route to Leh.

== Etymology ==
The Ladakh Chronicles spell the name of Kargil as Wylie: dkar skyil, THL: kar kyil. The word can be interpreted as meaning a bright or wholesome expanse. Modern newspapers are said to spell the name as Wylie: dkar `khyil, THL: kar khyil. It can also be interpreted as a bright or wholesome mountainous amphitheatre. This phrase occurs often in Tibetan literature.

The Kargil basin does give the feel of an expanse surrounded by low-pitched mountains, with the low Khurbathang plateau at the southeastern corner. This is in sharp contrast to the deep gorges that give access to the valley.

The people of Kargil, however, relate the name to Khar (fort) and rkil (centre) and interpret it as a central place among many forts. Radhika Gupta has opined that it is a fitting description for a place that is equidistant from Srinagar, Leh and Skardu.

== Location ==
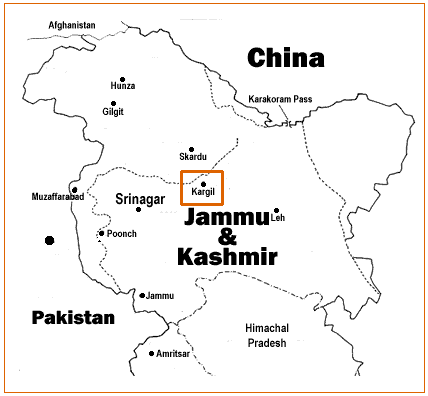
Location of Kargil with respect to Kashmir, Baltistan and Leh

Kargil is located at the confluence of multiple river valleys:

- the Suru River valley to the north and south,
- the Wakha Rong valley to the southeast leading to Leh, and
- the Sod Valley to the east leading to the Indus Valley near Batalik.

In addition, at a short distance to the north, the Dras River valley (Note: The Dras River is also referred to as Shingo River by some authors. The latter flows from Pakistan-administered Baltistan and joins the Dras River a few miles upstream from Kargil. Both the names are used for the combined river.) branches off from the Suru valley leading to the Zoji La pass in the west and Kashmir Valley beyond. Further north along the Suru valley, one reaches the Indus valley, leading to Skardu. Thus, Kargil is located at a key junction of routes between Kashmir, Ladakh and Baltistan.

The normal trade route between Leh and Skardu also ran via Kargil, using the Wakha Rong and Suru valleys. Even though both the towns are on the bank of the Indus River, the latter's narrow gorge between Marol and Dah was not easily traversable prior to the modern period.

After the Partition of India and the First Kashmir War, Baltistan came under the control of Pakistan. The Line of Control (LoC) with Pakistan-administered Kashmir is roughly 11 kilometres (6.8 mi) to the north of Kargil. The peak known as Point 13620, which overlooks the Kargil town and the Srinagar–Leh Highway, remained in Pakistani control at the end of this conflict. During the Indo-Pakistan War of 1971, Indian forces pushed the Line of Control north of the ridgeline, ensuring Kargil's security. A key village called Hunderman came under Indian control as a result of this push.

== History ==
The Sod Valley had a strong fort called Sod Pasari (Wylie: sod pa sa ri, now known as Pasar Khar) by the 16th or 17th century. It controlled "Lower Purig", including the Sod Valley, the lower portion of Wakha Rong and, likely the Kargil basin itself. By the 18th or 19h century, it also had a sub-branch at Pashkum (Note: Alternative spellings: Pashkyum and Paskyum.) (Wylie: pas kyum) southeast of Kargil town in the Wakha Rong valley.

=== Dogra period ===
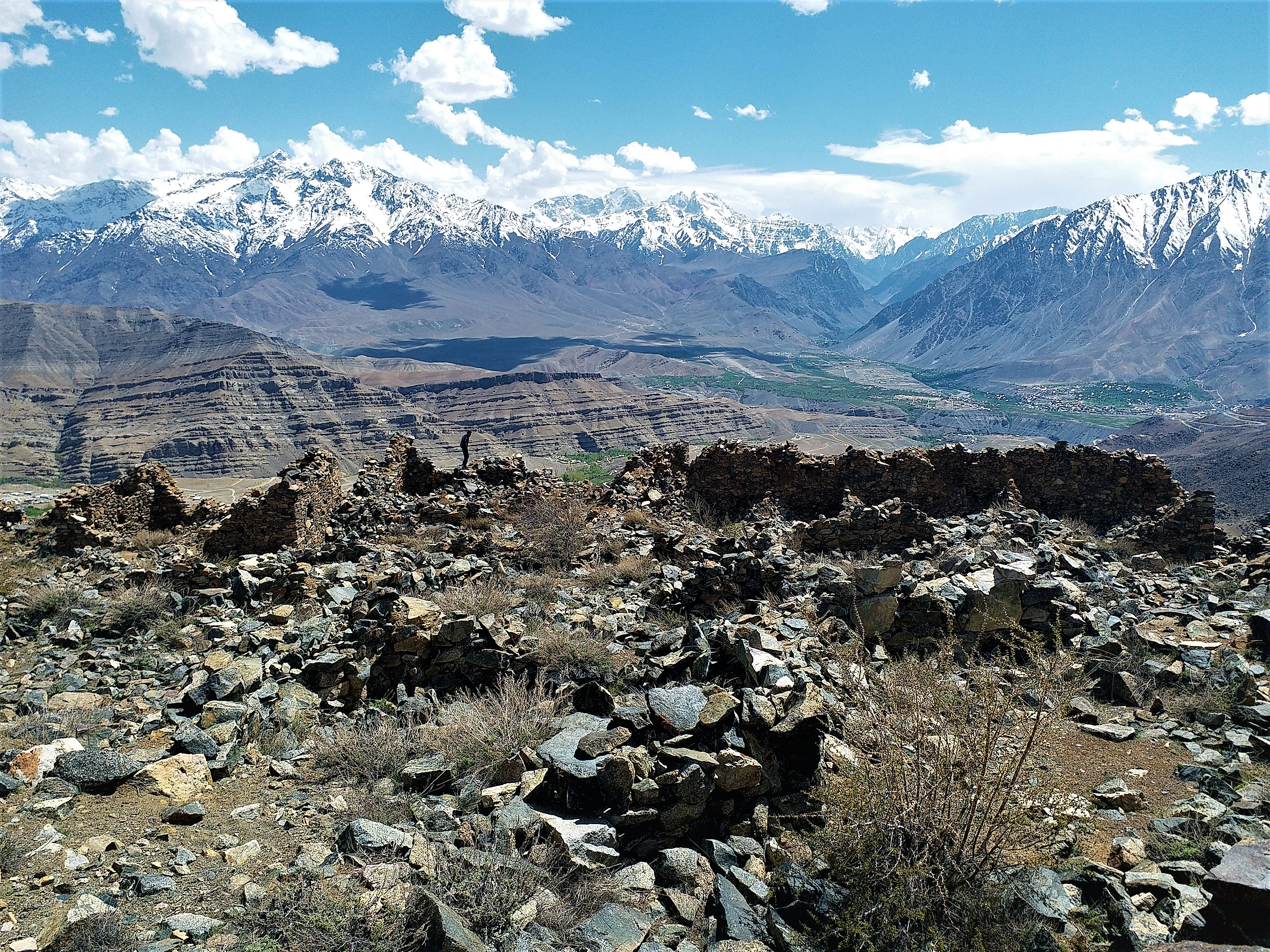
Ruins of the old fort at Sod

During Zorawar Singh's invasion of Ladakh in 1834, the Dogras attacked both the forts Sod Pasari and Pashkum, and destroyed them. Afterwards, Zorawar Singh built a fort at Kargil, and stationed a Kardar (administrator), with the charge of the Kargil region as well as Drass. In 1838, the people of the region revolted against the Dogras and killed the kardar as well as entire garrison stationed at Kargil.

In 1840, after another rebellion in Ladakh, Zorawar Singh deposed the Gyalpo of Ladakh and annexed the kingdom. He also decided to invade Baltistan which had assisted the Gyalpo in rebellion. On the way to Baltistan, he made a detour to Sod, routed the rebels and annexed the whole of Purig. He appointed kardars for Dras and Suru. (Note: These two were probably in addition to a Kardar at Kargil. As noted by Cunningham, three garrison forts at the three locations were present when the British came to the scene.)

After Zorawar Singh's death in Tibet, there was another rebellion in Ladakh and Purig with the support of the Tibetan forces. But Dogras sent fresh forces under Wazir Lakhpat, who beat back the Tibetans and reestablished status quo ante. On returning, the Wazir garrisoned the Kargil fort and took all the Rajas of the region as prisoners.

Alexander Cunningham described the Kargil fort in 1854 as a square of about sixty yards on the left bank of the Suru River immediately above its junction with Wakha Rong. It was able to defend the bridge over the Suru River and completely command the Kashmir–Ladakh road.

In 1854, there were three ilaqas (subdistricts) in the present day Kargil district, at Kargil, Dras and Zanskar respectively. They were headed by civil officers called Thanadars. During the reign of Pratap Singh, a wazarat (district) was established for all the frontier regions (including Gilgit), and Kargil was made a tehsil of the wazarat. Sometime later, Gilgit was separated, and Kargil, Skardu and Leh made up the Ladakh wazarat. The district headquarters shifted between the three locations each year.

=== Importance to central Asian trade route ===
In historical times, Ladakh was a busy entrepôt for Silk Route trade between Central and South Asia. Both Leh and Kargil benefitted from the trade between South and Central Asia as posts and halting places on the caravan routes from Srinagar to Leh, and on to Central Asia until the mid-20th century. During the colonial period, the significance of this trade route in Kargil town manifested in the form of a serai, a rest-house, and post and telegraph offices. The small wooden shops and large emporiums of Kargil's small bazaar offered matches, kerosine oil, several varieties of sugar and tea, cotton cloth from Bombay and Manchester, and cheap glass and tinsel ornaments.

=== Independent India ===
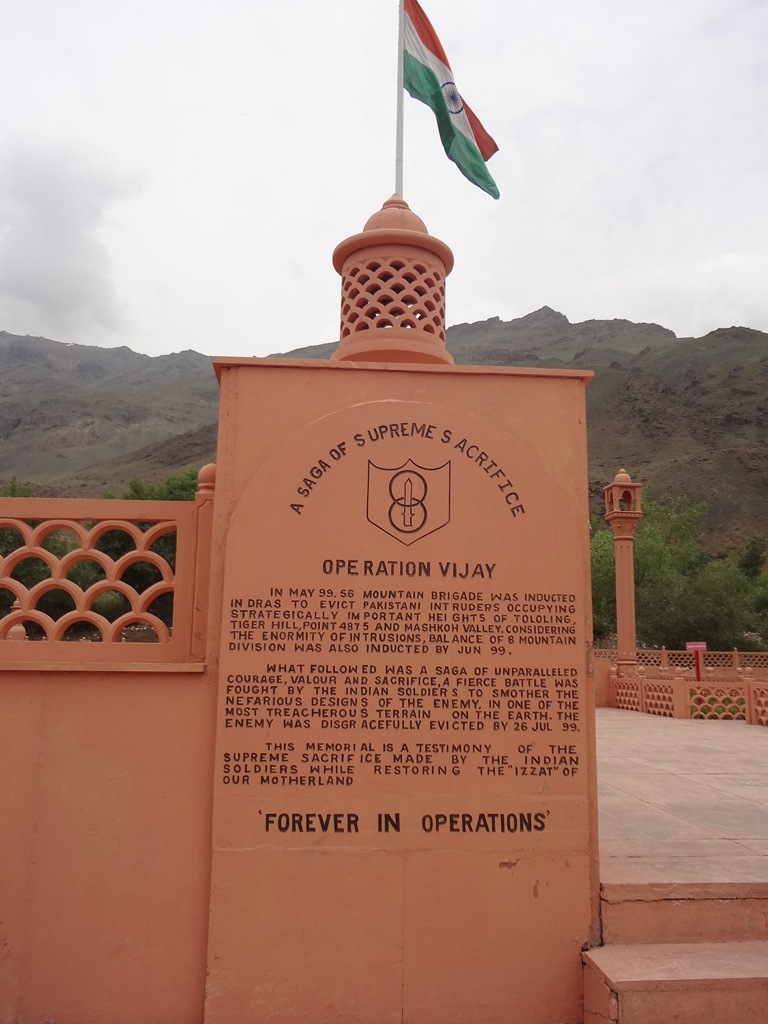
Kargil War Memorial

The First Kashmir War (1947–48) concluded with a ceasefire line that divided the Ladakh wazarat, putting roughly the Kargil and Leh tehsils on the Indian side, and the Skardu tehsil on the Pakistan side. The two Indian tehsils were soon promoted to districts and Ladakh was named a division, on a par with the Jammu and Kashmir divisions in the Indian state of Jammu and Kashmir. Pakistan renamed the Skardu tehsil Baltistan and divided it into further districts.

At the end of Indo-Pakistani War of 1971, the two nations signed the Simla Agreement, converting the former ceasefire line with some adjustments into a Line of Control, and promising not to engage in armed conflict with respect to that boundary.

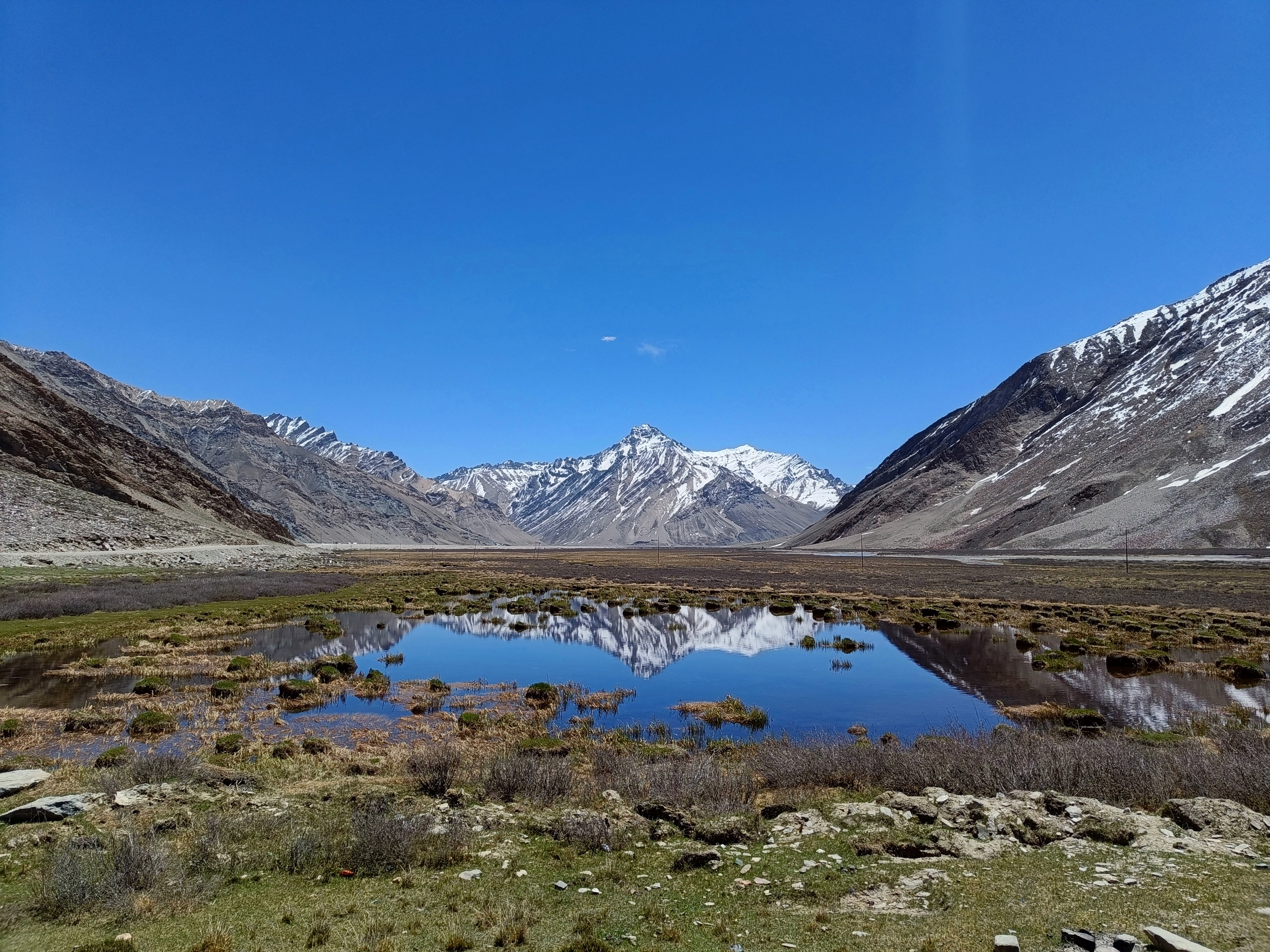
Rangdum village of Kargil enroute Zanskar from Kargil town.

In 1999, the area saw infiltration by Pakistani forces, leading to the Kargil War. Fighting occurred along a 160 km long stretch of ridges overlooking the only road linking Srinagar and Leh. The military outposts on the ridges above the highway were generally around 5,000 m (16,400 ft) high, with a few as high as 5,485 m (17,995 ft). After several months of fighting and diplomatic activity, the Pakistani forces were forced to withdraw to their side of the Line of Control by their Prime minister Nawaz Sharif after he visited the United States.

== Geography ==
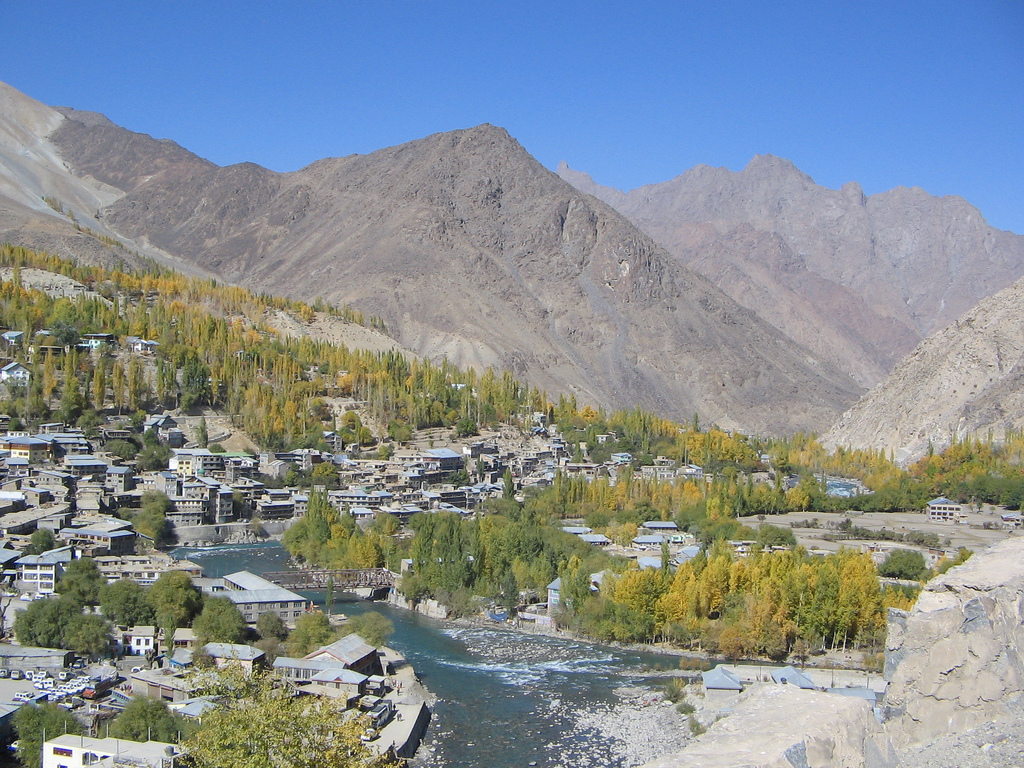
Kargil town along the Suru river valley

Kargil has an average elevation of 2,676 m (8,780 ft), and is situated along the banks of the Suru River. The town of Kargil is located 205 km (127 mi) from Srinagar, facing Gilgit-Baltistan across the LoC. Like other areas in the Himalayas, Kargil has a temperate climate. Summers are hot with cool nights, while winters are long and chilly with temperatures often dropping below −20 °C (−4 °F).

== Demographics ==
As per the 2011 census, Kargil had a population of 16,338 individuals, an increase from the population of 10,657 recorded in the 2001 census. The population increased almost ten times from the 1961 census when 1,681 persons were recorded. The proportion of urban population in the Kargil district concomitantly increased from 3.7% to 11.6%. (Note: During the same period, the population of the Kargil district tripled from 45,064 to 140,802.) As of 2011, the population consisted of 10,082 males and 6,256 females. Majority (70%) of the population belonged to Scheduled Tribes. The town had a literacy rate of 83.6%.

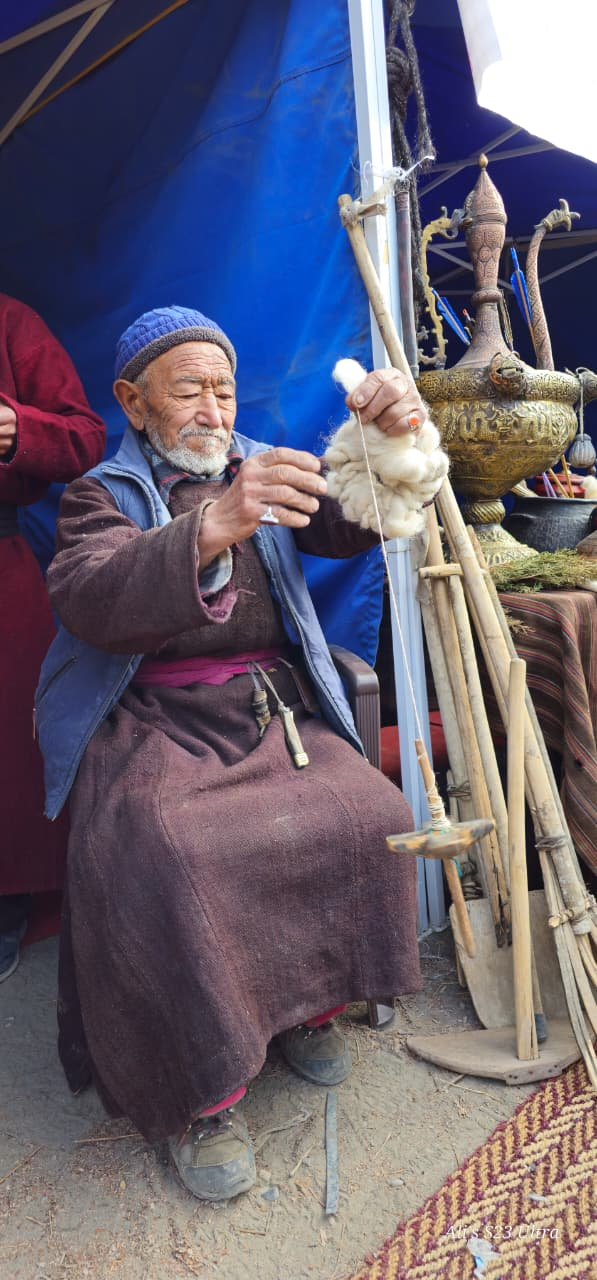
An old man of Kargil in traditional attire.

=== Religion ===
Religion in Kargil Town (2011)
1. Islam (85.2%)
2. Buddhism (14.2%)
3. Sikhism (0.01%)
4. Hinduism (0.00%)
5. Christianity (0.30%)
6. Jainism (0.00%)
7. Others (0.01%)
8. Not Stated (0.09%)

Islam is the largest religion followed by over 77% of the adherents, followed by Hinduism adhered to by 19.2% of the population. Sikhism (2.2%), Buddhism (0.5%) and Christianity (0.4%) are other minor religions. English, Hindi, Ladakhi, Purgi, and Urdu are declared official languages in the territory. Other spoken languages include Balti, Shina, Zanskari, and other Dardic languages.

== Transportation ==
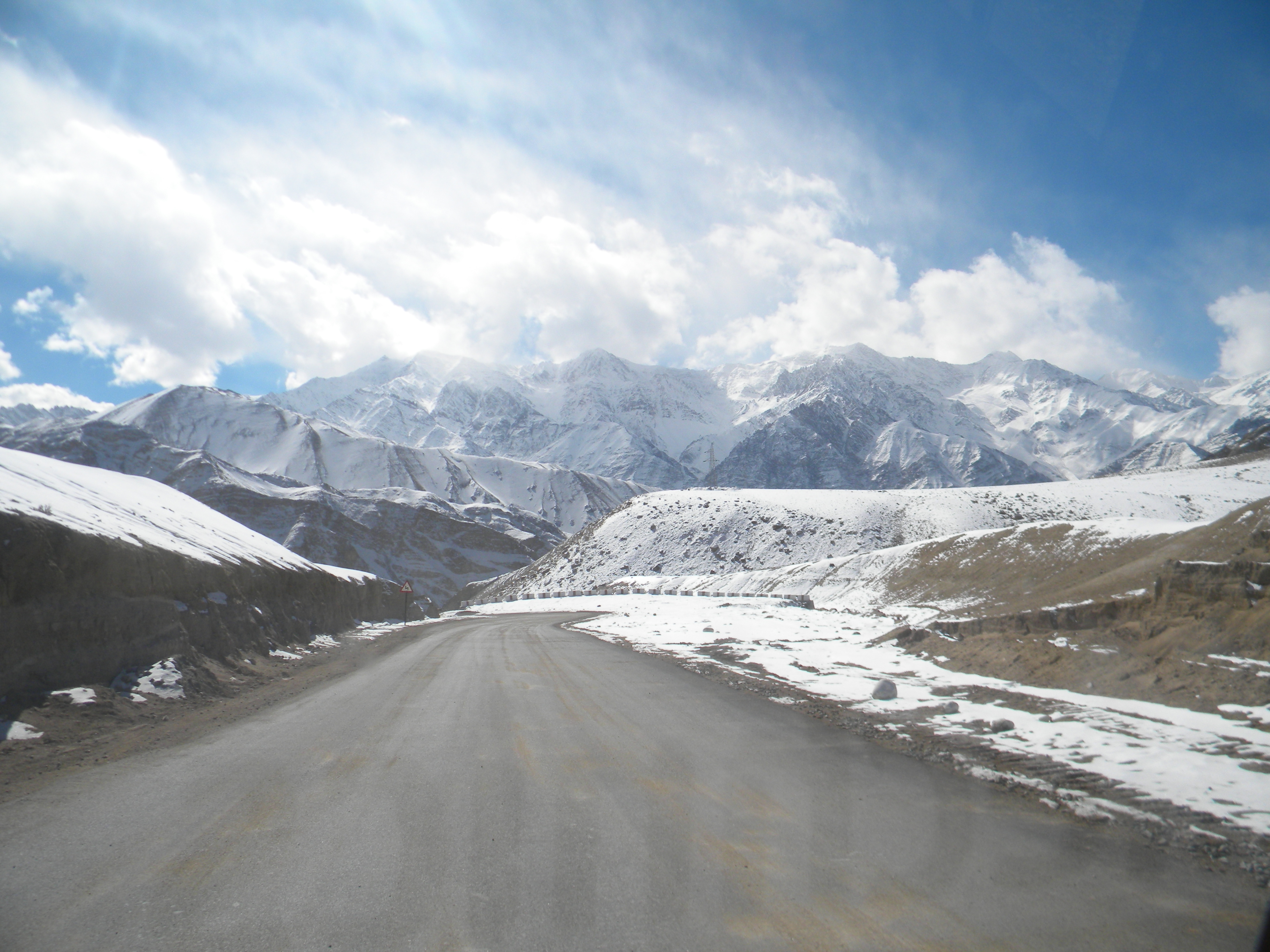
National highway NH 1 connects Srinagar and Leh via Kargil

Kargil is located on national highway NH 1 connecting Srinagar to Leh. NH 301 extends from the junction with NH 1 in Kargil and extends to Zanskar. The highways connecting Kargil to Srinagar and Zanskar are often blocked by snow from during winter. NH 1 from Kargil to Dras and Leh also experiences temporary blockages due to adverse weather. Government operated buses provide local connectivity, and also connect Kargil with other towns. The Kargil-Skardu road earlier linked Kargil to Skardu in Gilgit-Baltistan in Pakistan-administered Kashmir. It has been closed since the Indo-Pakistani war of 1947–1948.

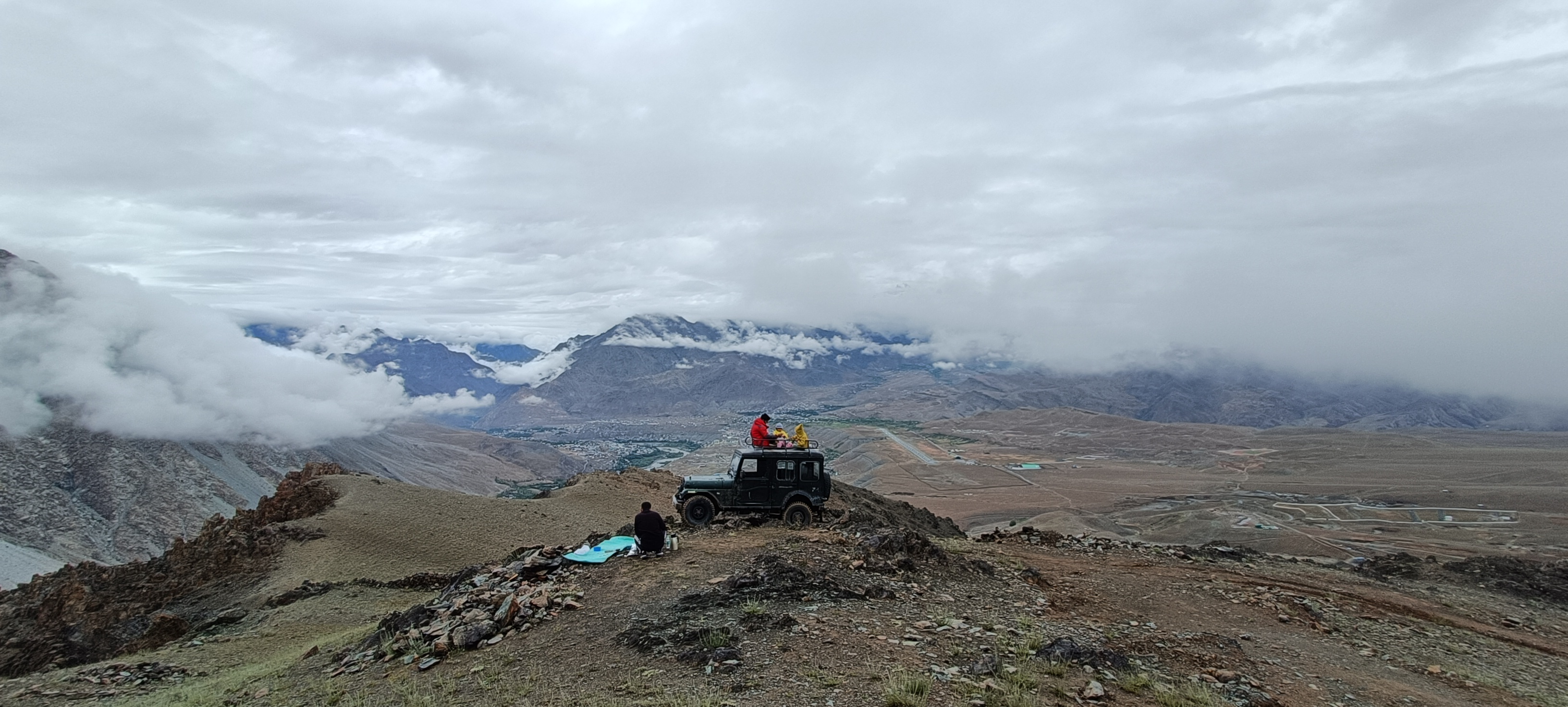
View of Kargil airport from Choskore La.

Kargil Airport was built in 1996 for civilian operations. The operational control was later transferred to the Indian Air Force. The air force operates seasonal flights that carry cargo and transport civilians during the winter. The nearest major airports are the Leh Airport with regular domestic flights and the Srinagar International Airport. Srinagar railway station is the nearest railway station from the town, and has limited railway services. The nearest major railhead is the Jammu Tawi railway station located about 440 km (270 mi) from the town.

== Media and communications ==
State owned public broadcaster All India Radio operates an AM radio station at Kargil.

== See also ==
- Purigpa

== Bibliography ==
- Aggarwal, Ravina (2004), Beyond Lines of Control: Performance and Politics on the Disputed Borders of Ladakh, India, Duke University Press, ISBN 0-8223-3414-3
- Charak, Sukhdev Singh (1983), General Zorawar Singh, Publications Division, Government of India – via archive.org
- Cunningham, Alexander (1854), Ladak: Physical, Statistical, Historical, London: Wm. H. Allen and Co – via archive.org
- Francke, Rev. A. H. (1907), A History of Western Tibet, S. W. Partridge & Co – via archive.org
- Gupta, Radhika (2013). "Allegiance and Alienation: Border Dynamics in Kargil". In David N. Gellner (ed.). Borderland Lives in Northern South Asia. Duke University Press. pp. 47–71. ISBN 978-0-8223-7730-6.
- Francke, August Hermann (1926). Antiquities of Indian Tibet, Part 2. Calcutta: Superintendent Government Printing – via archive.org.
- Handa, O. C. (2001), Buddhist Western Himalaya: A politico-religious history, Indus Publishing, ISBN 978-81-7387-124-5
- Huttenback, Robert A. (1961), "Gulab Singh and the Creation of the Dogra State of Jammu, Kashmir, and Ladakh" (PDF), The Journal of Asian Studies, 20 (4): 477–488, doi:10.2307/2049956, JSTOR 2049956, S2CID 162144034, archived from the original (PDF) on 23 November 2018
- Karim, Maj Gen Afsir (2013), Kashmir The Troubled Frontiers, Lancer Publishers LLC, pp. 30–, ISBN 978-1-935501-76-3
- Panikkar, K. M. (1930), Gulab Singh, London: Martin Hopkinson Ltd
- Rizvi, Janet (1996), Ladakh: Crossroads of High Asia (Second ed.), Oxford University Press, ISBN 978-0-19-564016-8 – via archive.org
