= Guru (disambiguation) =

A guru is an Indian spiritual teacher.

Guru or The Guru may also refer to:

== Computing ==
- Guru.com, a software company and job board service
- Guru, a language with dependent types
- .guru, an Internet top-level domain

== Film ==
- The Guru (1969 film), a Merchant–Ivory film
- Guru (1980 film), a Tamil film starring Kamal Haasan and Sridevi
- Guru (1989 film), a Hindi-language film directed by Umesh Mehra
- Guru (1997 film), a Malayalam film directed by Rajiv Anchal
- The Guru (2002 film), a British film directed by Daisy von Scherler Mayer
- Guru (2003 film), a Bengali film directed by Swapan Saha
- Guru (2005 film), a Telugu film directed by B Jaffer
- Guru (2006 film), a film about the yoga guru K. Pattabhi Jois directed by Robert Wilkins
- Guru (2007 film), a Hindi film directed by Mani Ratnam
- Guru (2012 film), a Kannada film directed by Jaggesh
- Guru (2016 film), a Marathi film directed by Sanjay Jadhav
- Guru (2017 film), a Telugu film directed by Sudha Kongara

== Places ==
- Guru, Iran, a village in Kerman Province, Iran
- Guru, Kerman, a village in Kerman Province, Iran
- Guru, Jiroft, a village in Kerman Province, Iran
- Guru, Hormozgan, a village in Hormozgan Province, Iran

== Language and literature ==
- Guru (prosody), a "heavy" syllable in Sanskrit prosody
- Gurmukhi alphabet (ISO 15924 code Guru), the sacred Indic script used to write Punjabi (the other one being the Perso-Arabic based traditional Shahmukhi)
- GuRu, a 2018 book by RuPaul

== Music ==
- Guru (rapper) (1961–2010), hip hop MC from Gang Starr
- Guru (Ghanaian rapper) (born 1987)
- The Guru (album), a 2005 album by PSD
- Guru (soundtrack), a soundtrack album from the 2007 film
- "Guru", a song by Erste Allgemeine Verunsicherung from À la Carte

== Other media ==
- "The Guru" (Avatar: The Last Airbender), an episode of Avatar: The Last Airbender
- The Guru (Sly Cooper), a character from the video game Sly 3: Honor Among Thieves
- Guruji, an antagonist played by Pankaj Tripathi in the Indian television show Sacred Games
- Guru Pandian, a character in the Indian KGF (film series)

== People ==
- Gurutze Fernández (born 1979), or Guru, Spanish footballer
- Eric Grothe Sr. (born 1960), Australian former rugby league footballer nicknamed "Guru"
- Trivikram Srinivas (born 1971), Indian film director, nicknamed "Guruji"

== Other uses ==
- Guru, Hindu astrological name for the planet Jupiter
- Guru Studio, a Canadian animation studio
- Global Urban Research Unit, at Newcastle University
- Guru Meditation, an error message on certain Amiga computers

== See also ==
- GuRoo, a humanoid robot
- Expert, a person with extensive knowledge or ability in a particular domain
- Gru (disambiguation)
- Mahaguru (disambiguation)
- Shankar Guru (disambiguation)
- Guruji (surname), an Indian surname
