= Sankar =

Sankar generally refers to a Hindu god, Lord Shiva, and may also refer to:

== People ==
- Shankar–Ganesh (born 1943), Indian music director duo
- Sankar (writer) (Mani Shankar Mukherjee, 1933–2026), Bengali author
- Beni Sankar (born 1948), Guyanese cricketer
- C. Sankar, Indian politician
- Kayman Sankar (1926–2014), Guyanese rice magnate
- R. Sankar (1909–1972), Chief Minister of Kerala, India
- Sankar Das Sarma (born 1953), India-born American theoretical condensed matter physicist
- Sankar Basu, electrical engineer
- Shyam Sankar, Chief Technology Officer and Executive Vice President of Palantir Technologies

== Others ==
- Gauri Sankar, the second highest peak of the Rolwaling Himal
- Sankar Cement, a brand of cement manufactured by India Cements
- Sankar, Nepal, a village in Nepal
- Sankar Monastery, a Buddhist monastery in Ladakh, northern India

== See also ==
- Sankara (disambiguation)
- Shankar (disambiguation)
- Shankara (disambiguation)
