= Savidan =

Savidan may refer to:

- Savidan, Iran, a village in Kerman Province, Iran
- Billy Savidan (1902–1991), New Zealand athlete
- Patrick Savidan (born 1965), French philosopher
- Steve Savidan (born 1978), French footballer
