= Zorawar Fort =

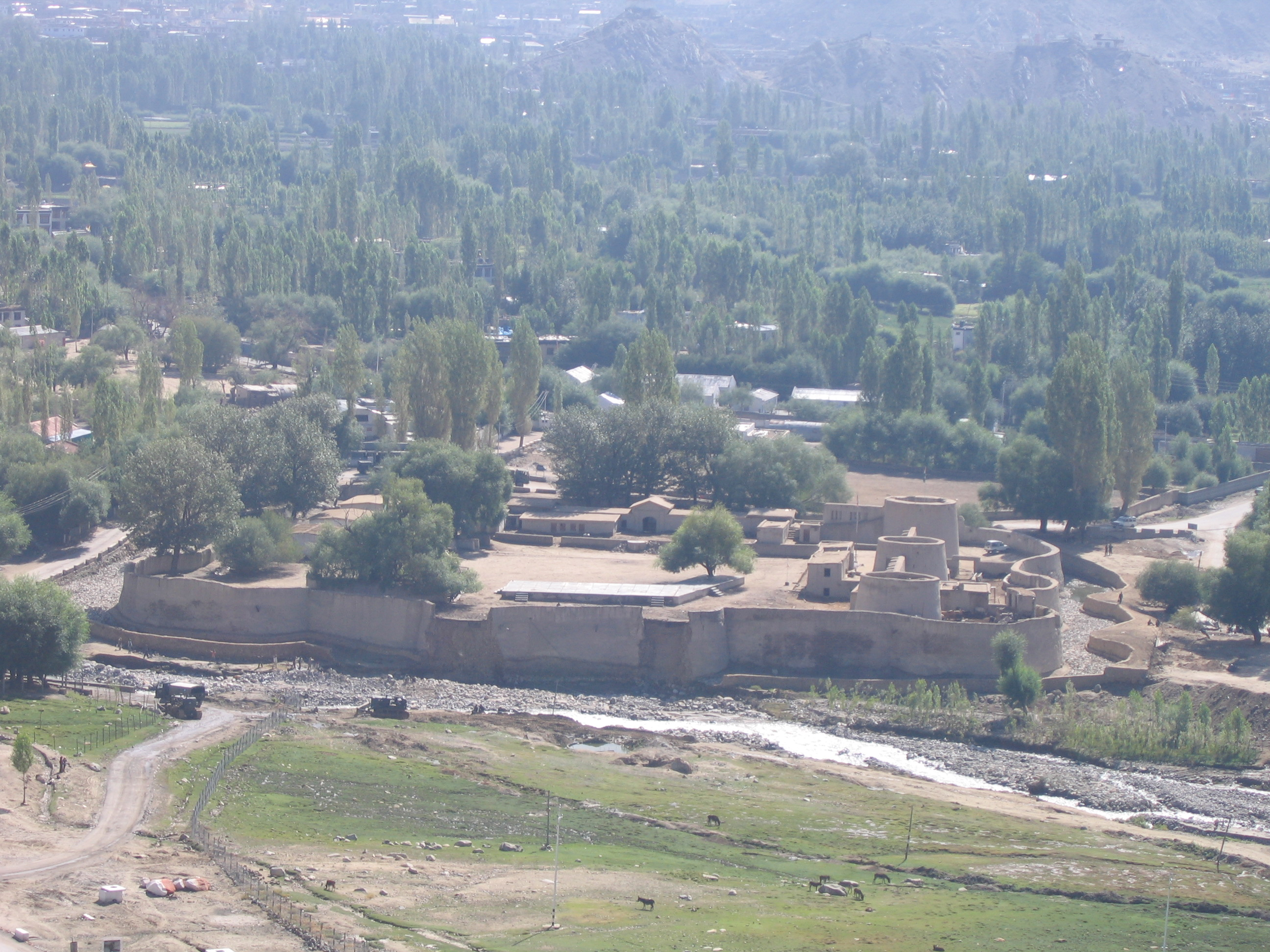
- Interactive map of the Zorawar Fort area

General information
- Location: Leh, Ladakh, India
- Coordinates: 34.158056°N 77.569722°E

Zorawar Fort is a fort in Leh, Ladakh, India built in 1836 by Zorawar Singh, a general of Dogra ruler Gulab Singh. Zorawar Singh led the Dogra invasion of Ladakh and built the fort at Leh after deposing the last Gyalpo of Ladakh. The fort currently houses a museum that preserves treasures of the rulers as well as coins and postage stamps. It also offers a light and sound show describing the history of Ladakh.

== Access ==
This fort is on Skara Road, Leh, at a distance of about 7 minutes from Leh Palace.

=== By Road ===
Leh-Srinagar National Highway (known as National Highway 1D) and Leh-Manali Highway are the two routes to reach Leh. However, these routes are open only during summer.

J&K Road Transport provides public transport options from Srinagar to Leh (434Kms) which takes two days and Himachal Road Transport Corporation provides bus services from Manali to Leh (474Kms) which takes about 20hours.

=== By Air ===
Leh Airport is the nearest airport and in winter months this is the only way to reach Leh.
