= Leh =

City in Ladakh, Indian-administered Kashmir

Leh གླེ་
- City and municipality
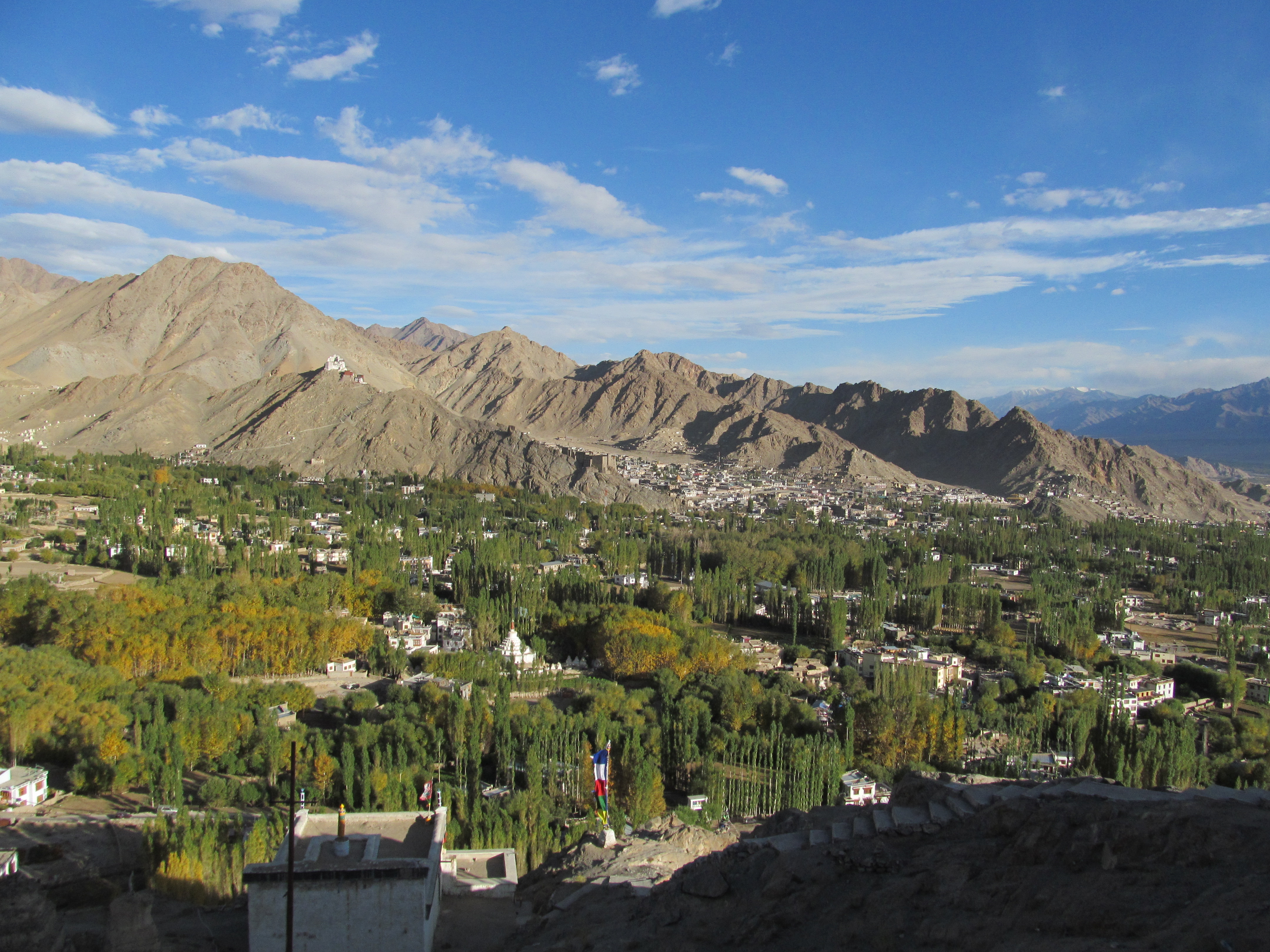
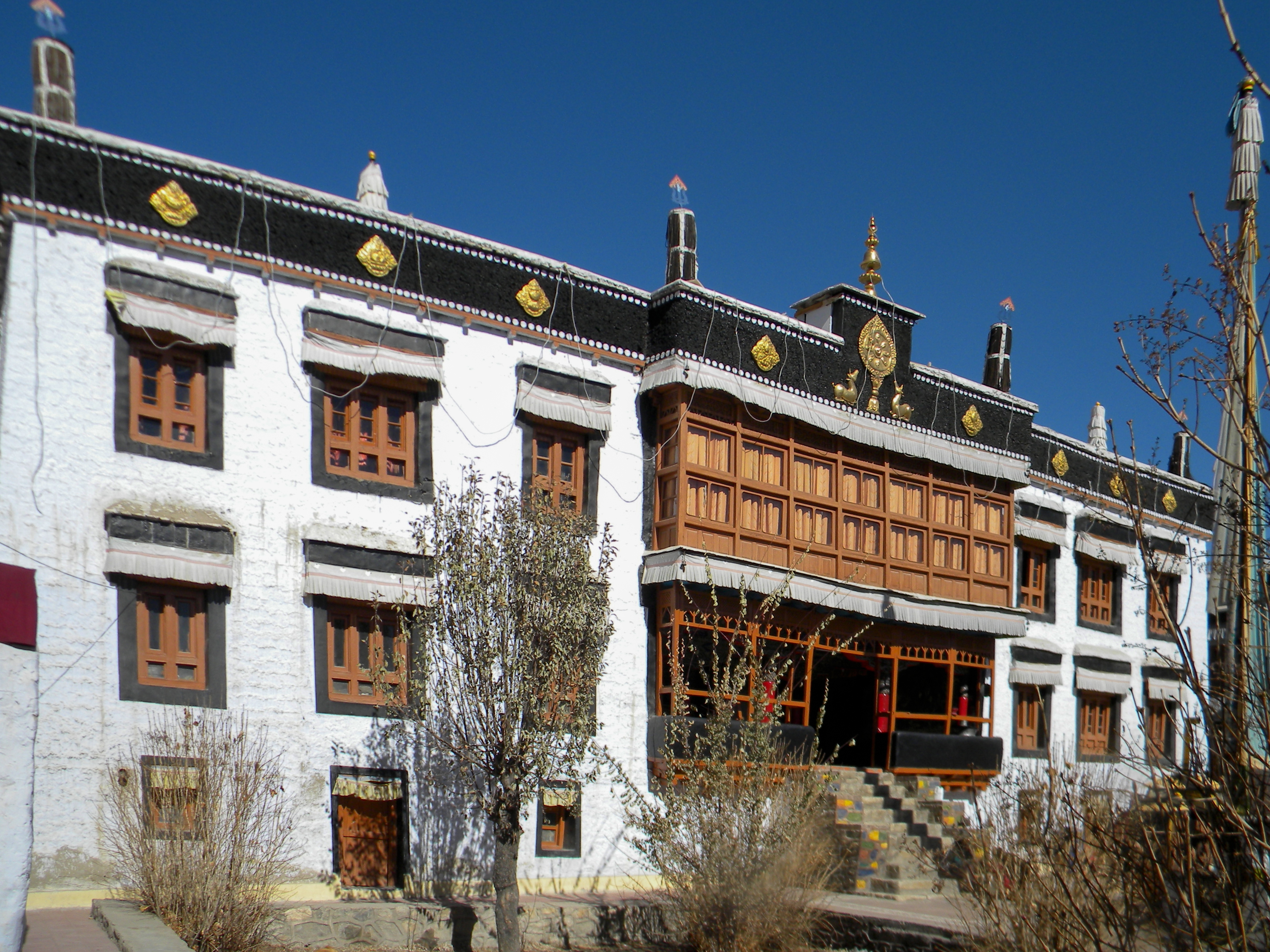
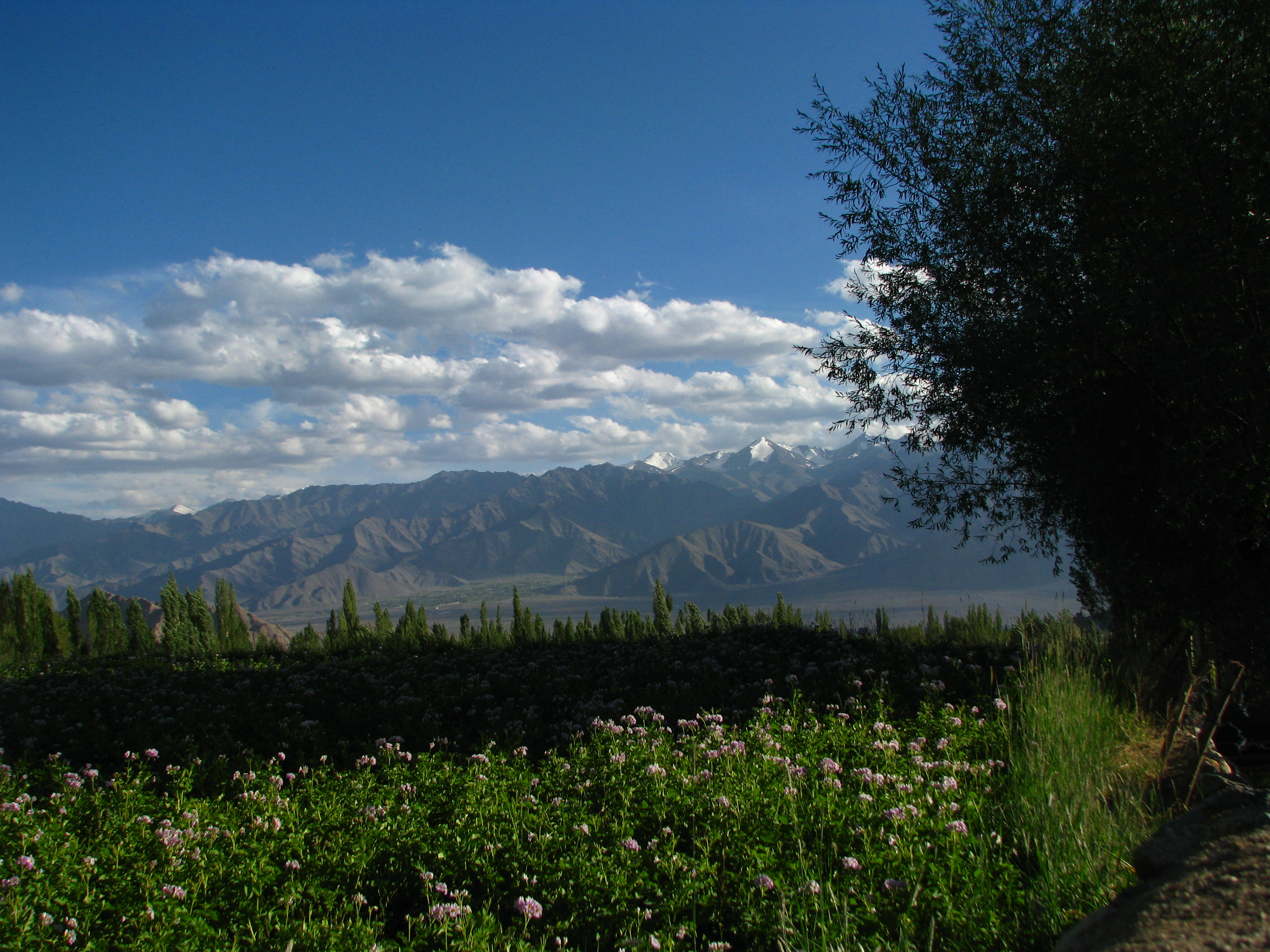
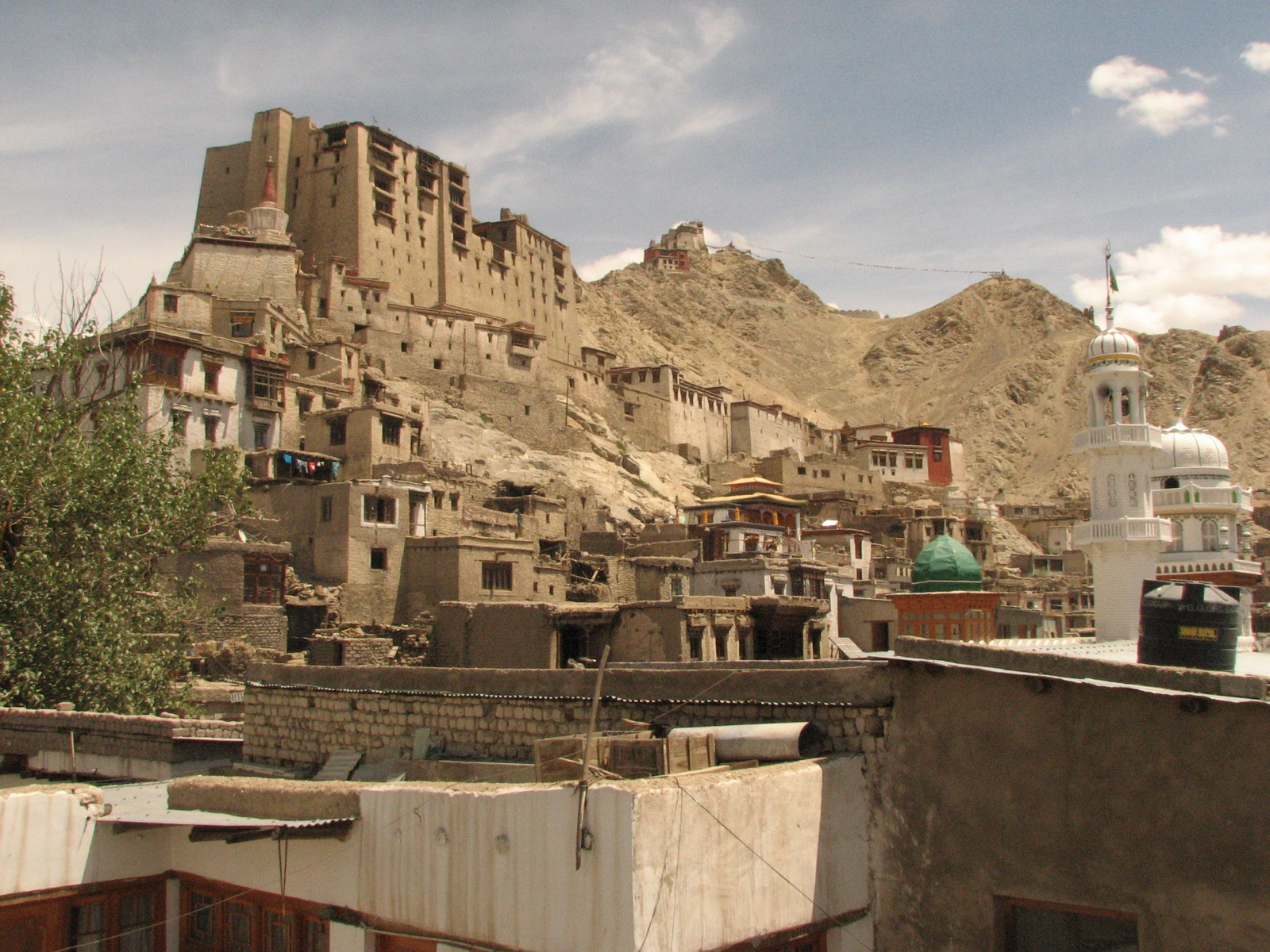
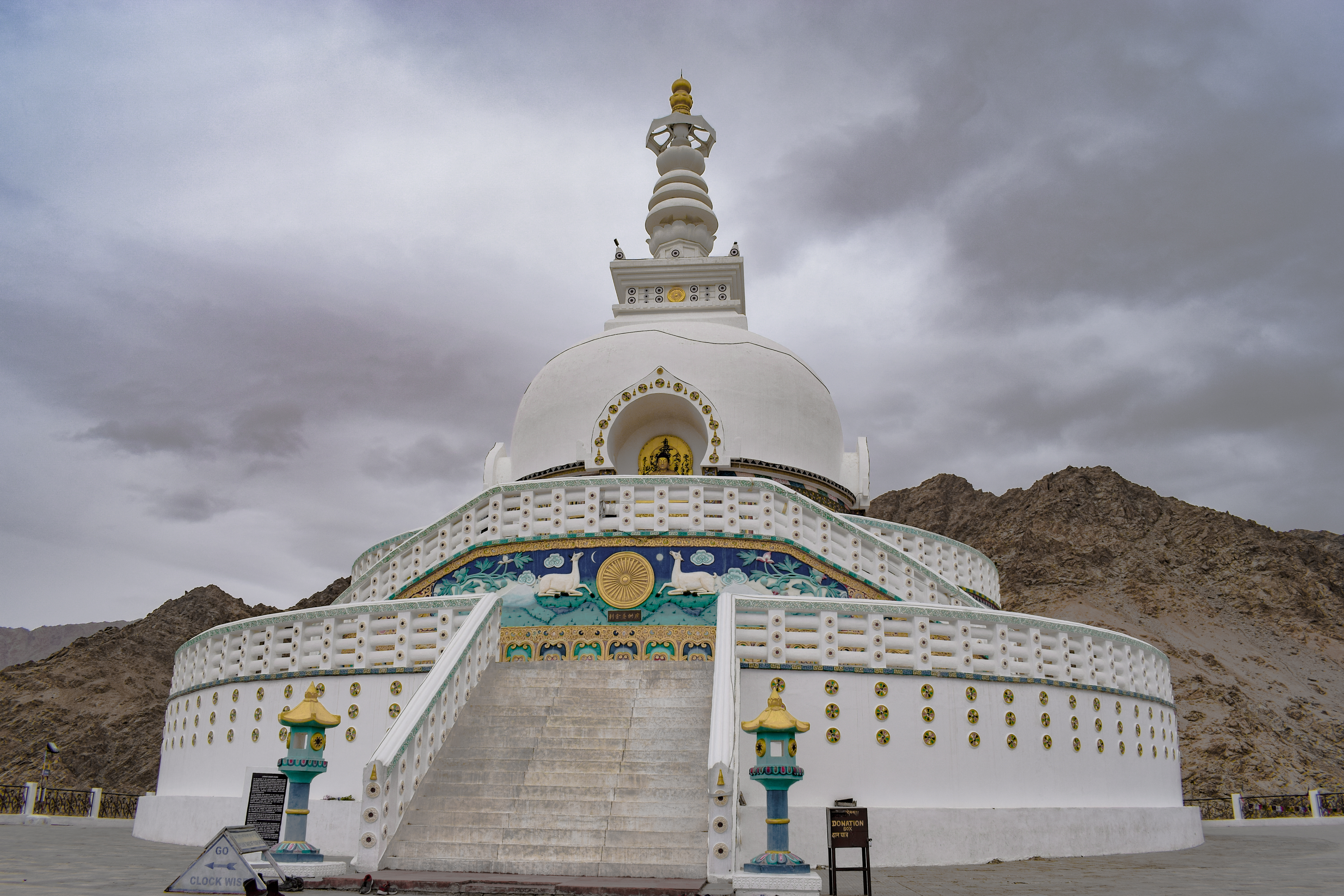
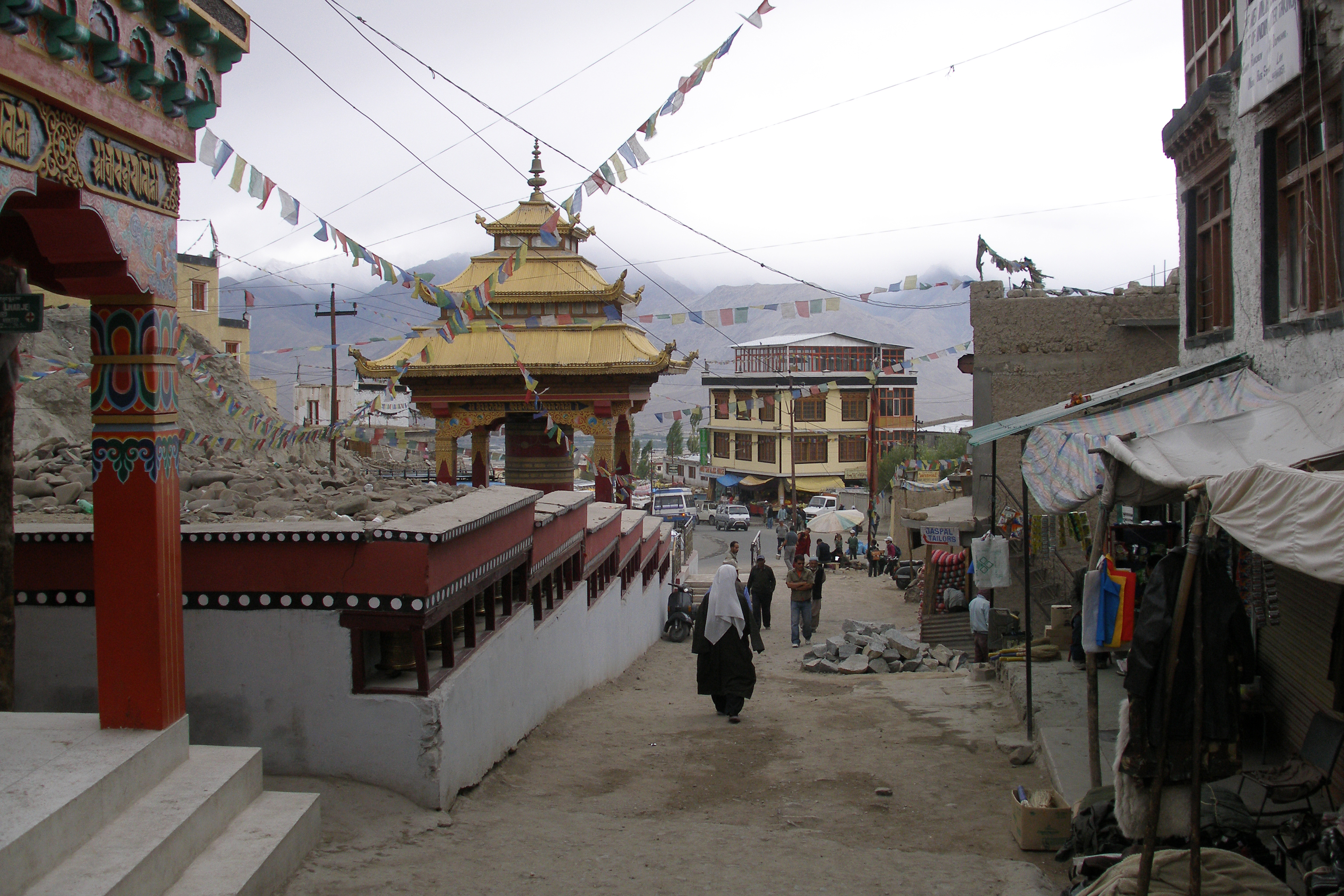
- Leh city Sankar Monastery Spring in Leh Leh Palace Shanti Stupa Old city

- Location in Ladakh, India Leh (India)
- Coordinates: 34°9′10.322″N 77°34′38.142″E
- Administering country: India
- Union territory: Ladakh
- District: Leh

Government
  - Type: Municipality
  - Body: Ladakh Autonomous Hill Development Council, Leh

Area
  - Total: 9.15 km^{2} (3.53 sq mi)
- Elevation: 3,500 m (11,500 ft)

Population (2011)
  - Total: 30,870
  - Density: 3,370/km^{2} (8,740/sq mi)

Languages
  - Official: Bhoti; Purgi; Urdu; Hindi; English
- Time zone: UTC+5:30 (IST)
- Postal codes: 194101,194106
- Vehicle registration: LA 02
- Website: leh.nic.in

Leh (Ladakhi: སླེ་) is a city in Indian-administered Ladakh in the disputed Kashmir region. It is the largest city and the joint capital of Ladakh. Leh, located in the Leh district, has been the capital of Ladakh since the medieval period and was historically capital of the Kingdom of Ladakh.

The seat of the kingdom, Leh Palace, the former residence of the royal family of Ladakh, was built in the 17th-century and is frequently contrasted with the Potala Palace in Tibet. Leh is at an altitude of 3,524 m (11,562 ft), and is connected via National Highway 1 to Srinagar in the southwest and to Manali in the south via the Leh-Manali Highway (part of National Highway 3).

== Etymology ==
The original name of the town was not sLel, as it is nowadays spelled, but sLes, which denotes an "encampment of nomads" (pastureland). These [Tibetan] nomads probably visited the Leh valley at the time when it began to be irrigated by Dard colonisers. The most ancient part of the ruins, atop rNam-rgyal-rtse-mo hill, are called 'aBrog-pal-mkhar (Dard castle).

== History ==
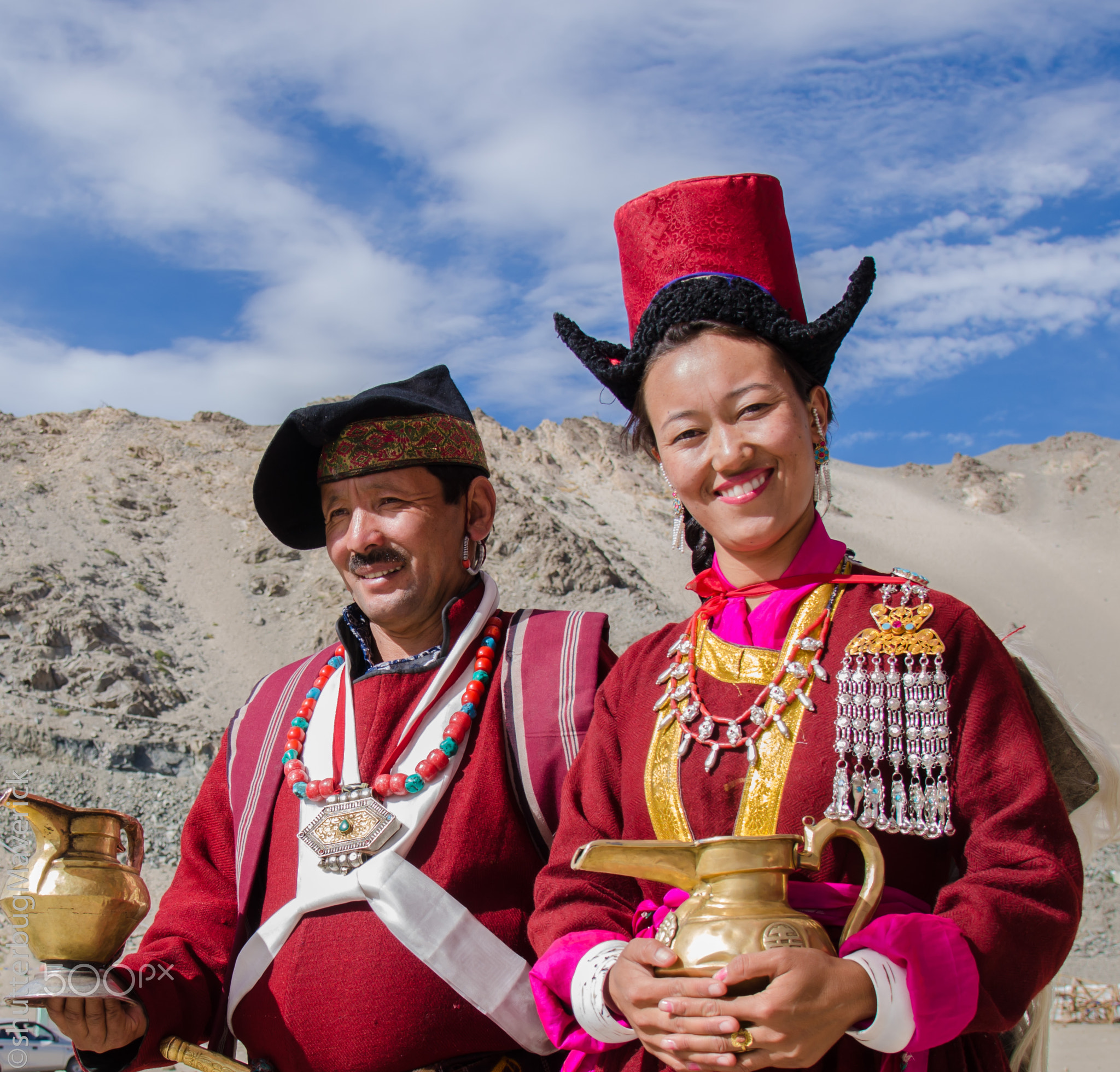
People of Leh in traditional dress

Leh was for centuries an important stopover on trade routes along the Indus Valley between Tibet, Kashmir, India and China. The main goods carried were salt, grain, pashm or cashmere wool, charas or cannabis resin from the Tarim Basin, indigo, silk yarn and Banaras brocade.

Although there are a few indications that the Chinese knew of a trade route through Ladakh to India as early as the Kushan period (1st to 3rd centuries AD), and certainly by the Tang dynasty, little is actually known of the history of the region before the end of the 10th century, when Tibetan prince Skyid lde nyima gon (or Kyide Nyimagon), a grandson of the anti-Buddhist Tibetan king, Langdarma (r. c. 838 to 841), founded the kingdom. He conquered Western Tibet, although his army originally numbered only 300 men. Several towns and castles are said to have been founded by Nyimagon, and he apparently ordered the construction of the primary sculptures at Shey. "In an inscription, he says he had them made for the religious benefit of the Tsenpo (the dynastical name of his father and ancestors), and of all the people of Ngaris (Western Tibet). This shows that already in this generation Langdarma's opposition to Buddhism had disappeared." Shey, 15 km east of modern Leh, was the ancient seat of the Ladakhi kings.

During the reign of Delegs Namgyal (1660–1685), the Nawab of Kashmir, then a province in the Mughal Empire, arranged for the Mongol army to temporarily leave Ladakh, though it returned later. As payment for assisting Delegs Namgyal in the Tibet–Ladakh–Mughal war of 1679–1684, the Nawab made a number of onerous demands. One of the least was construction of a large Sunni Muslim mosque in Leh, at the upper end of the bazaar below Leh Palace. The mosque reflects a mixture of Muslim and Tibetan architecture and can accommodate more than 500 people. This was apparently not the first mosque in Leh; there are two smaller ones that are said to be older.

== Administration ==
The Ladakh Autonomous Hill Development Council (LAHDC) is in charge of governance in Leh. It has 30 councillors, 4 nominated and 26 elected. The Chief Executive Councillor heads and chairs this council. The Deputy Commissioner of Leh also holds the power of chief executive officer of the LAHDC.

== Geography ==
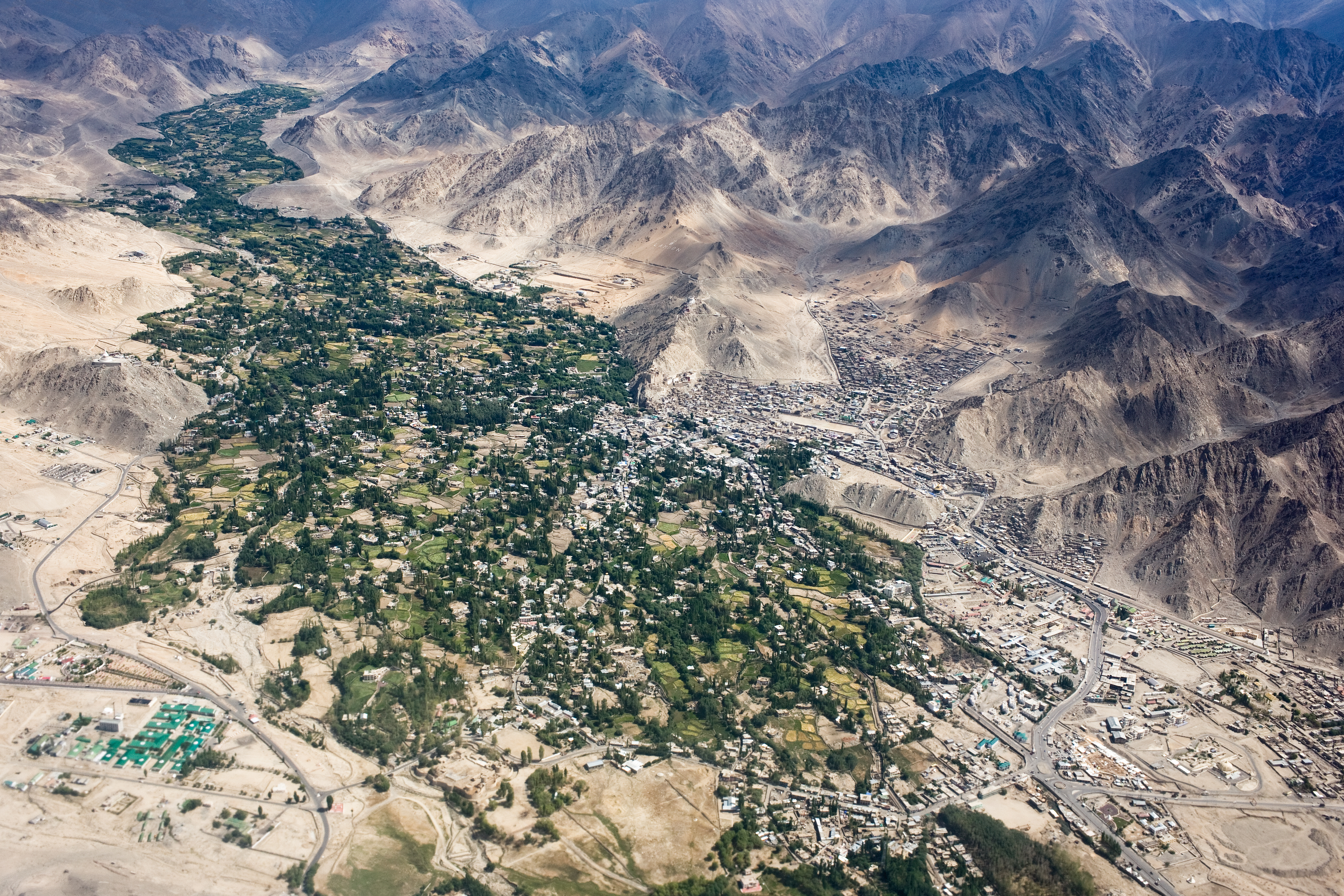
Leh and its surroundings

Leh, India

Climate chart (precipitation, max. and min. temperature)
J	F	M	A	M	J	J	A	S	O	N	D
4.3 2 −13	2.5 4 −9	1.5 10 −4	1.7 15 2	0.6 20 6	2.9 24 11	6.8 29 16	6.2 28 15	4.4 23 9	2.3 17 0	0.7 11 −7	1 5 −12
- █ Average max. and min. temperatures in °C
- █ Precipitation totals in mm
- Source: India Meteorological Department
Imperial conversion
J	F	M	A	M	J	J	A	S	O	N	D
0.2 35 8	0.1 40 15	0.1 49 25	0.1 60 35	0 68 43	0.1 76 52	0.3 83 61	0.2 83 59	0.2 74 49	0.1 62 33	0 51 19	0 40 11
- █ Average max. and min. temperatures in °F
- █ Precipitation totals in inches

=== Topography ===
The city is located on the bank of the Indus River. The mountains dominate the landscape around the Leh, as it is at an altitude of 3,500 metres or 11,500 feet. Peaks such as Nanga Sago can reach well above 5,500 metres or 18,000 feet. The principal access roads include the 434 kilometres (270 mi) Srinagar-Leh highway and the 428 kilometres (266 mi) Leh-Manali Highway. Both roads are only open on a seasonal basis. Although the roads from Srinagar and Manali are often blocked by snow in winter, the local roads in the Indus Valley usually remain open due to the low levels of snowfall.

=== Climate ===
Leh has a cold desert climate (Köppen climate classification BWk) with long, cold winters from late November to early March, with minimum temperatures well below freezing for most of the winter. The city gets occasional snowfall during winter, which is very cold by Indian standards, mainly due to its high elevation. The weather in the remaining months is generally fine and warm during the day. Average annual rainfall is only 34.8 mm (1.37 in), with summer months seeing the most precipitation due to rare residual monsoon systems that enter the Himalayas. In 2010, the city experienced flash floods that killed more than 100 people.

Since climate data was recorded in 1951, Leh's climate has significantly changed, with average temperatures rising by 4.0 °C (39.2 °F) and yearly precipitation decreasing by 70 mm (2.8 in).

Climate data for Leh (34°09′N 77°34′E, 3,513 m (11,526 ft) AMSL) (1951-2020 normals, extremes 1883-2020)
Month	Jan	Feb	Mar	Apr	May	Jun	Jul	Aug	Sep	Oct	Nov	Dec	Year
Record high °C (°F)	9.0 (48.2)	13.4 (56.1)	19.4 (66.9)	23.9 (75.0)	28.9 (84.0)	34.8 (94.6)	36.6 (97.9)	35.4 (95.7)	31.8 (89.2)	27.0 (80.6)	20.0 (68.0)	13.6 (56.5)	36.6 (97.9)
Mean maximum °C (°F)	6.3 (43.3)	9.3 (48.7)	15.9 (60.6)	20.8 (69.4)	24.8 (76.6)	30.7 (87.3)	33.4 (92.1)	33.2 (91.8)	28.8 (83.8)	22.6 (72.7)	16.0 (60.8)	9.6 (49.3)	34.1 (93.4)
Mean daily maximum °C (°F)	1.5 (34.7)	4.2 (39.6)	9.7 (49.5)	15.3 (59.5)	20.0 (68.0)	24.4 (75.9)	28.5 (83.3)	28.1 (82.6)	23.4 (74.1)	16.7 (62.1)	10.6 (51.1)	4.5 (40.1)	15.6 (60.0)
Mean daily minimum °C (°F)	−13.1 (8.4)	−9.2 (15.4)	−3.7 (25.3)	1.6 (34.9)	6.2 (43.2)	11.3 (52.3)	15.9 (60.6)	15.1 (59.2)	9.2 (48.6)	0.3 (32.5)	−7.2 (19.0)	−11.7 (10.9)	1.2 (34.2)
Mean minimum °C (°F)	−20.0 (−4.0)	−15.9 (3.4)	−10.4 (13.3)	−3.7 (25.3)	0.6 (33.1)	4.7 (40.5)	10.5 (50.9)	9.7 (49.5)	2.3 (36.1)	−6.3 (20.7)	−12.9 (8.8)	−16.6 (2.1)	−19.5 (−3.1)
Record low °C (°F)	−28.3 (−18.9)	−28.6 (−19.5)	−19.4 (−2.9)	−12.8 (9.0)	−7.7 (18.1)	−1.1 (30.0)	0.6 (33.1)	1.5 (34.7)	−4.4 (24.1)	−9.6 (14.7)	−18.6 (−1.5)	−25.6 (−14.1)	−28.6 (−19.5)
Average precipitation mm (inches)	9.5 (0.37)	8.1 (0.32)	11.0 (0.43)	9.1 (0.36)	9.0 (0.35)	3.5 (0.14)	15.2 (0.60)	15.4 (0.61)	9.0 (0.35)	7.5 (0.30)	3.6 (0.14)	4.6 (0.18)	34.8 (1.37)
Average precipitation days (≥ 0.3 mm)	1.3	1.1	1.3	1.0	1.1	0.4	2.1	1.9	1.2	0.4	0.5	0.7	3.8
Average relative humidity (%) (at 17:30 IST)	51	51	46	36	30	26	33	34	31	27	40	46	38
Source: India Meteorological Department (humidity 1951-1980)

== Demographics ==
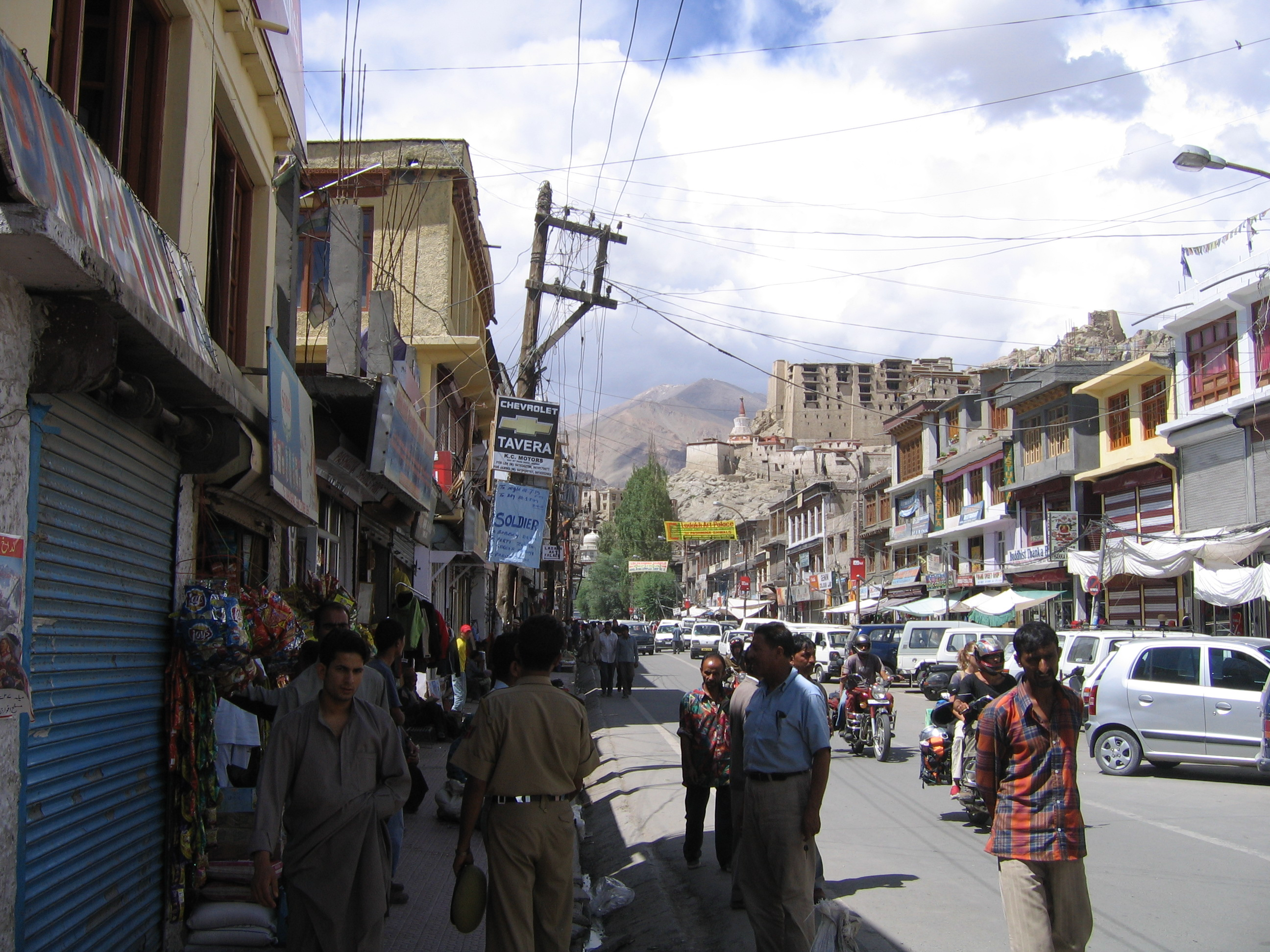
People at the old market in Leh

=== Population ===
As of the 2011 India census, Leh had a population of 30,870. Males constituted 70% of the population and females 30%, due to a large presence of transient labourers, traders and government employees. The child sex ratio was 987. Leh had an average literacy rate of 90%, higher than the national average of 74.04%; male literacy was 94.89%, and female literacy was 78.85%. In Leh, 5.5% of the population was under 6 years of age.

=== Ethnicity ===
The people of Leh belong to Ladakhi ethnicity who speak Ladakhi, a Tibetic language.

=== Religion ===
Religion in Leh City (2011)
1. Buddhism (43.9%)
2. Hinduism (35.4%)
3. Islam (15.1%)
4. Sikhism (2.70%)
5. Christianity (0.88%)
6. Jainism (0.05%)
7. Others (0.17%)
8. Not Stated (1.84%)

Buddhism is the largest religion in Leh City, followed by over 43% of people. Hinduism is the second-largest religion with 35% adherents. Islam and Sikhism form 15% and 2.7% of the population respectively. The Muslim presence here also dates back to the annexation of Ladakh by Kashmir, after the Fifth Dalai Lama came to Ladakh from Tibet. Since then, there has been further migration from the Kashmir Valley, due to trade and recently to the transfer of tourism from the Kashmir Valley to Ladakh.

Since the 8th century, people of different religions, particularly Buddhism and Islam, have lived in Leh. They co-inhabited the region from the early Namgyal dynasty and there are no records of any conflict between them. Meer Izzut-oollah wrote in the early 19th century:

This mosque was built by Ibraheem Khan (in the mid 17th century), who was a man of noble family in the service of the descendants of Timur. In his time the Kalimaks (Calmuck Tartars), having invaded and obtained possession of the greater portion of Tibet [Ladakh], the Raja of that country claimed protection from the Emperor of Hindustan. Ibraheem Khan was accordingly deputed by that monarch to his assistance, and in a short time succeeded in expelling the invaders and placing the Raja once more on his throne. The Raja embraced the Mahomedan faith, and formally acknowledged himself as a feudatory of the Emperor, who honored him with the title of Raja Akibut Muhmood Khan, which title to the present day is borne by the Ruler of Kashmir.

In recent times, Muslims heading to Leh from neighbouring Kargil and Kashmir has increased due to better opportunities. A growing pattern in the city and surrounding areas shows more Buddhist women choosing to marry Muslim men.

Other religions such as Christianity, Hinduism and Sikhism do exist in Leh. The small Christian community in Leh descend from Tibetan Buddhists converted by German Moravian missionaries, who established a church at Keylong in Lahaul in the 1860s, and were allowed to open another mission in Leh in 1885 and had a sub-branch in Khalatse. They stayed until Indian Independence in 1947. In spite of their successful medical and educational activities, they were able to make only a few converts.

== Economy ==
=== Agriculture ===
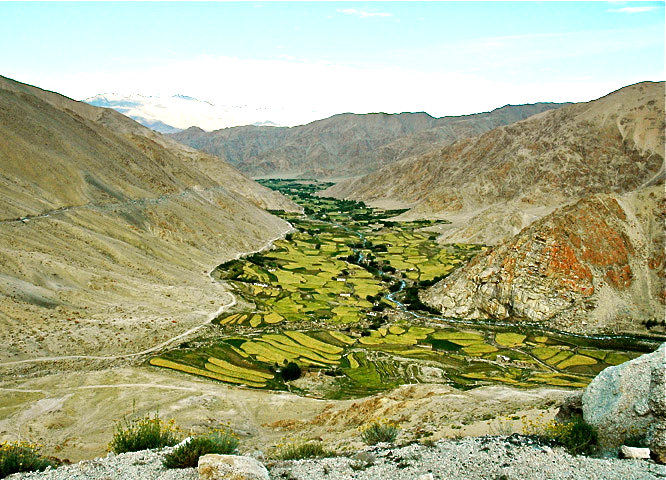
A view of agriculture around Leh

Leh is located at an average elevation of about 3500 metres, which means that only one crop a year can be grown there, while two can be grown at Khalatse. By the time crops are being sown at Leh in late May, they are already half-grown at Khalatse. The main crop is grim (naked barley, Hordeum vulgare L. var. nudum Hook. f., an ancient form of domesticated barley with an easier-to-remove hull. Tsampa, the staple food in Ladakh, is made from this barley. The water for agriculture of Ladakh comes from the Indus, which runs low in March and April when barley-fields have the greatest need for irrigation. Grapes, apricots, currants, walnuts, and apples are also grown in the arid temperate climate.

=== Banking ===
List of functioning banks in Leh:

- State Bank of India, Leh
- HDFC Bank, Leh
- Axis Bank, Leh
- IDBI Bank, Leh

=== Media and communications ===
State-owned All India Radio Leh has a local station in Leh, which transmits various programs of mass interest. Leh head post office owned by India Post also serves as a major means of communications. On 14 December 2021, the first FM radio station in Ladakh was established in Leh making the total FM stations 4 and one medium wave station as of February 2024.

== Tourism ==
Ladakh receives very large numbers of tourists for its size. Visitor numbers have swelled rapidly in the 21st century through 2010, increasing 77% from 2005 to 2010 (77,800 tourists), largely caused by an increase in domestic Indian travellers.

Tourism has continued to increase, exceeding 500,000 people in 2022 and 2023 in Ladakh. The sharpest growth began after 2010 when the Bollywood film 3 Idiots —filmed in part on the Pangong Lake in Ladakh — became a big hit in India. This is a contrast to the population of Leh, 31,000. This increase adds to the economy but it is having negative effects on the land due to the increase in waste and increasing water scarcity.

=== Leh Palace ===
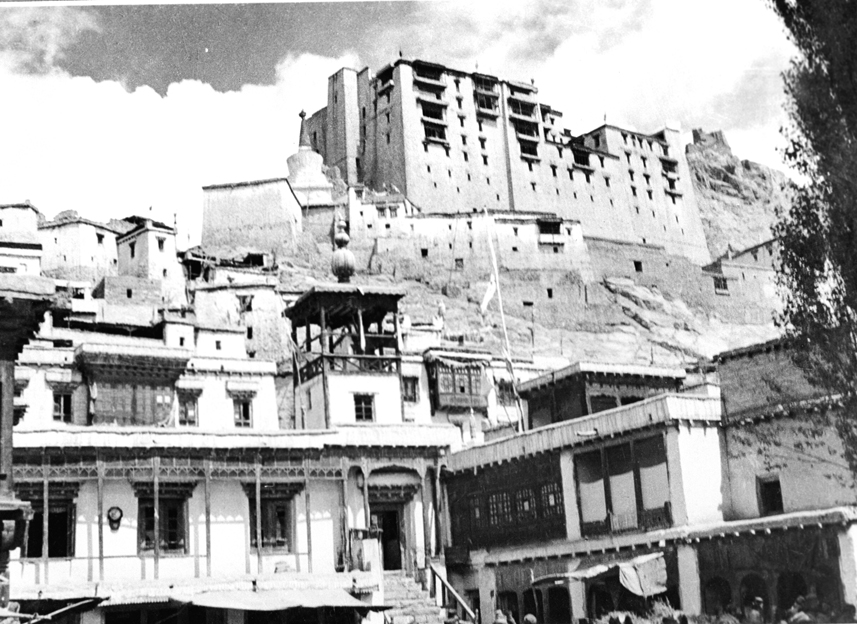
Old palace of the kings in Leh

The first recorded royal residence in Ladakh, built at the top of the high Namgyal ('Victory') Peak overlooking the present palace and town, is the now-ruined fort and gon-khang (Temple of the Guardian Divinities) built by King Tashi Namgyal. Tashi Namgyal ruled in the final quarter of the 16th century CE.

The Royal Palace, known as Leh Palace, was built by King Sengge Namgyal (1612–1642), presumably between the period when the Portuguese Jesuit priest Francisco de Azevedo visited Leh in 1631, and made no mention of it, and Sengge Namgyal's death in 1642. The Leh Palace is nine storeys high; the upper floors accommodated the royal family, and the stables and storerooms are located on the lower floors. The palace was abandoned when Kashmiri forces besieged it in the mid-19th century. The royal family moved their premises south to their current home in Stok Palace on the southern bank of the Indus River.

=== Leh Old Town ===
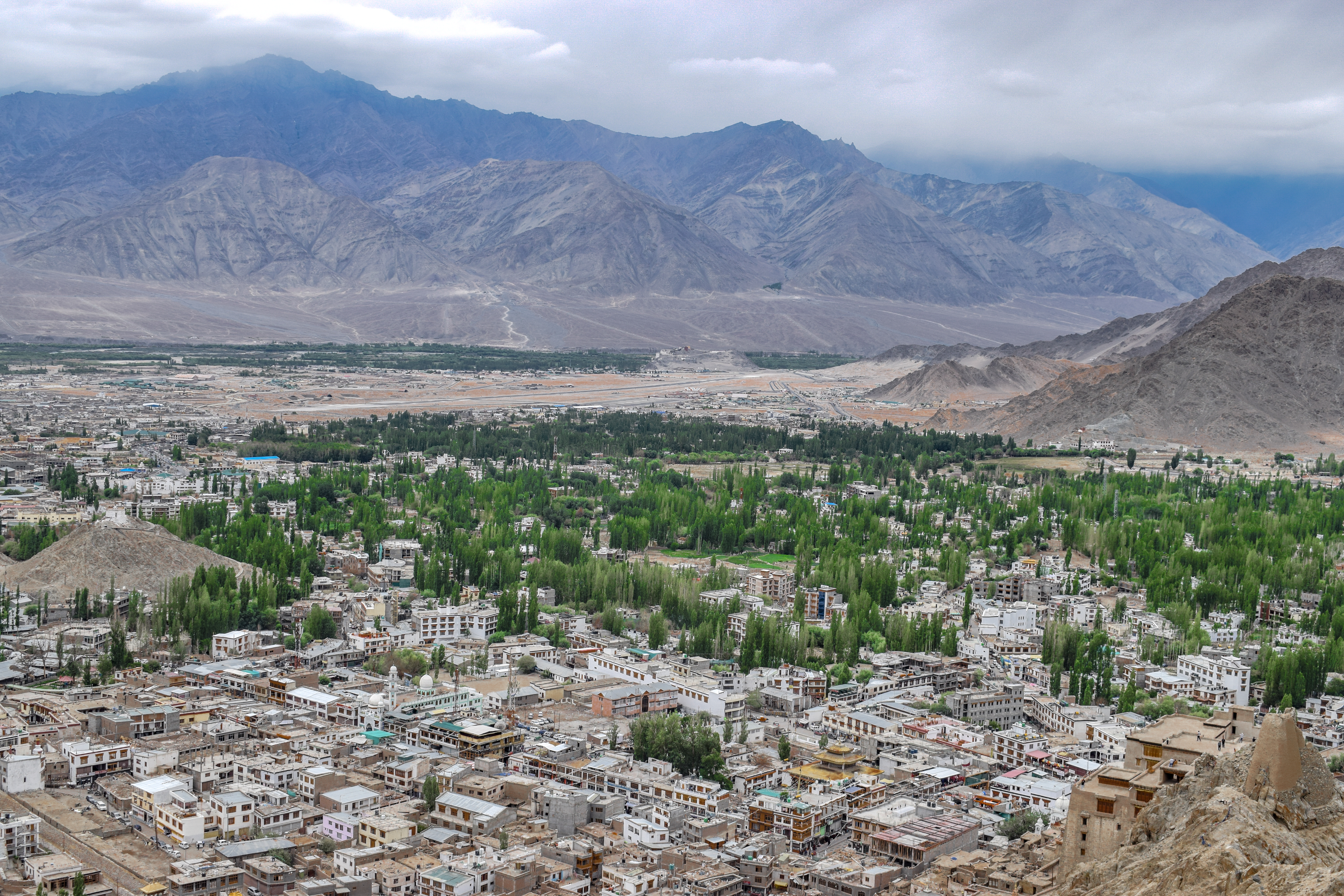
Leh city seen from Namgyal Tsemo Monastery and Leh Palace

The old town of Leh was added to the World Monuments Fund's list of 100 most endangered sites due to increased rainfall, due to climate change among other reasons. Neglect and changing settlement patterns in the old town have also threatened the long-term preservation of the site.

The rapid and poorly planned urbanisation of Leh has increased the risk of flash floods in some areas, while other areas, according to research by the Climate and Development Knowledge Network, suffer from the less dramatic, gradual effects of 'invisible disasters', which often go unreported.

=== Leh city ===
1. Leh Palace
2. Namgyal Tsemo Gompa
3. Shanti Stupa
4. Cho Khang Gompa
5. Chamba Temple
6. Jama Masjid
7. Gurdwara Pathar Sahib
8. Sankar Gompa and village
9. War Museum
10. The Victory Tower
11. Zorawar Fort
12. Ladakh Marathon
13. Datun Sahib
14. Ice Stupa
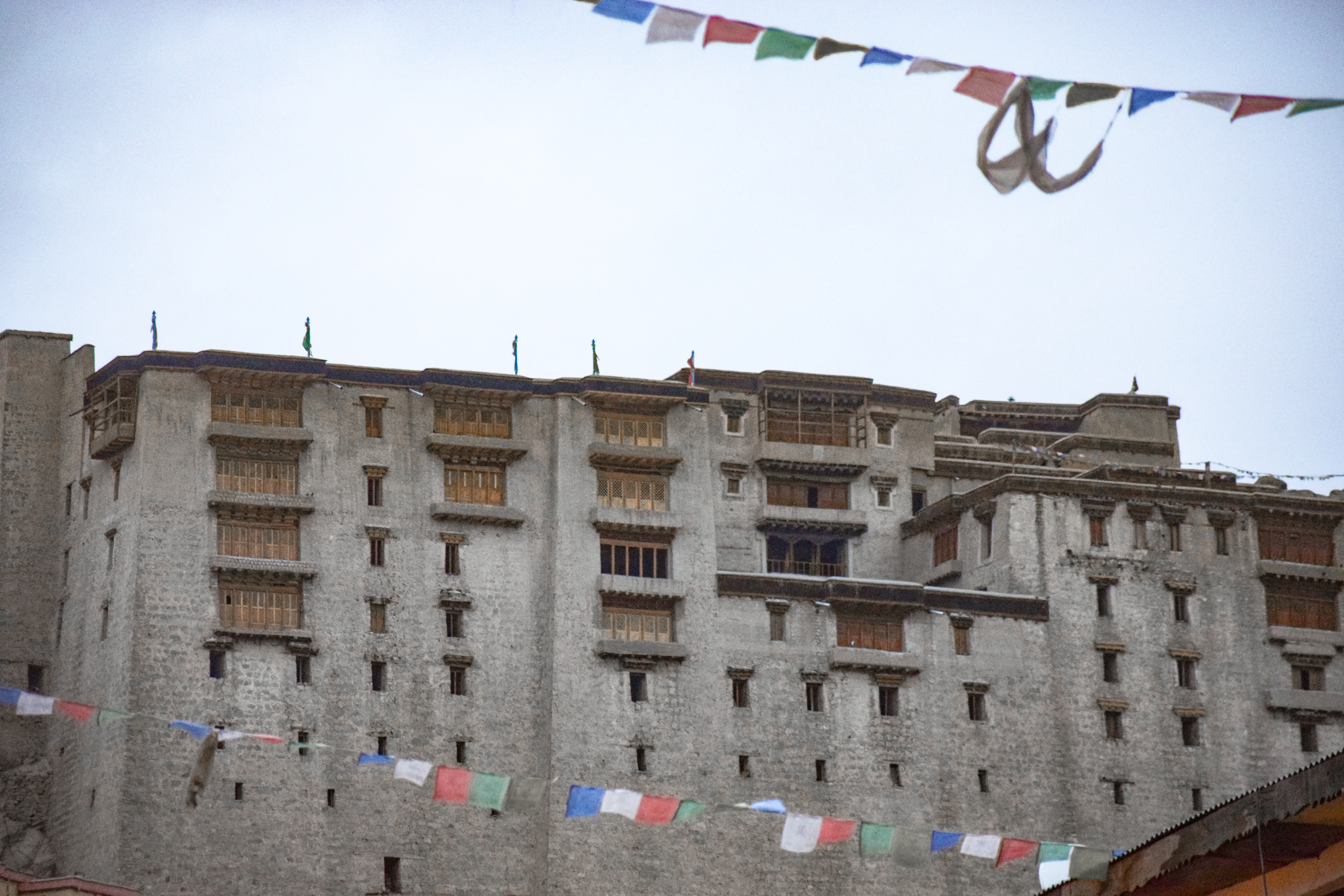
Leh Palace View from Leh Market

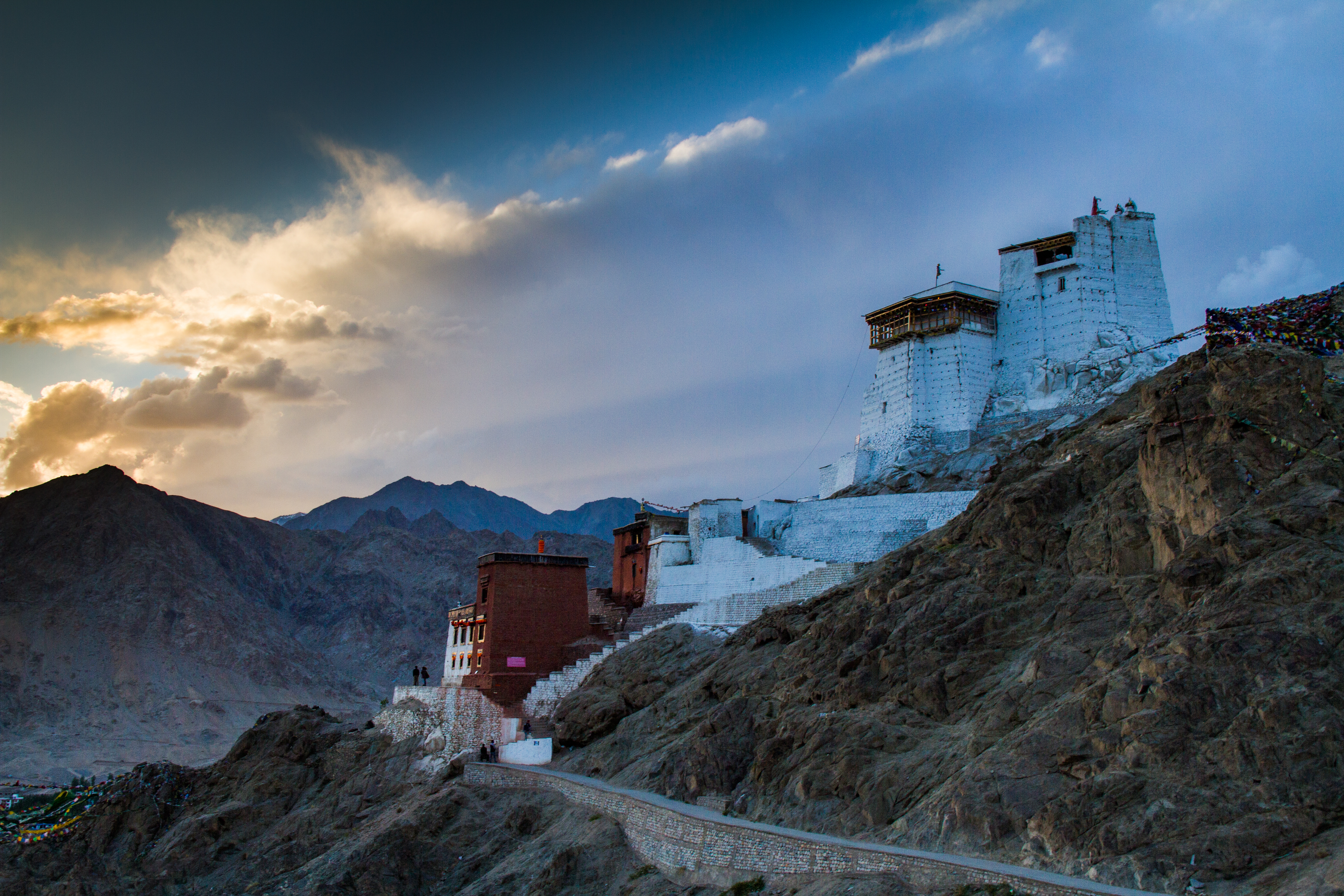
Namgyal Tsemo Gompa

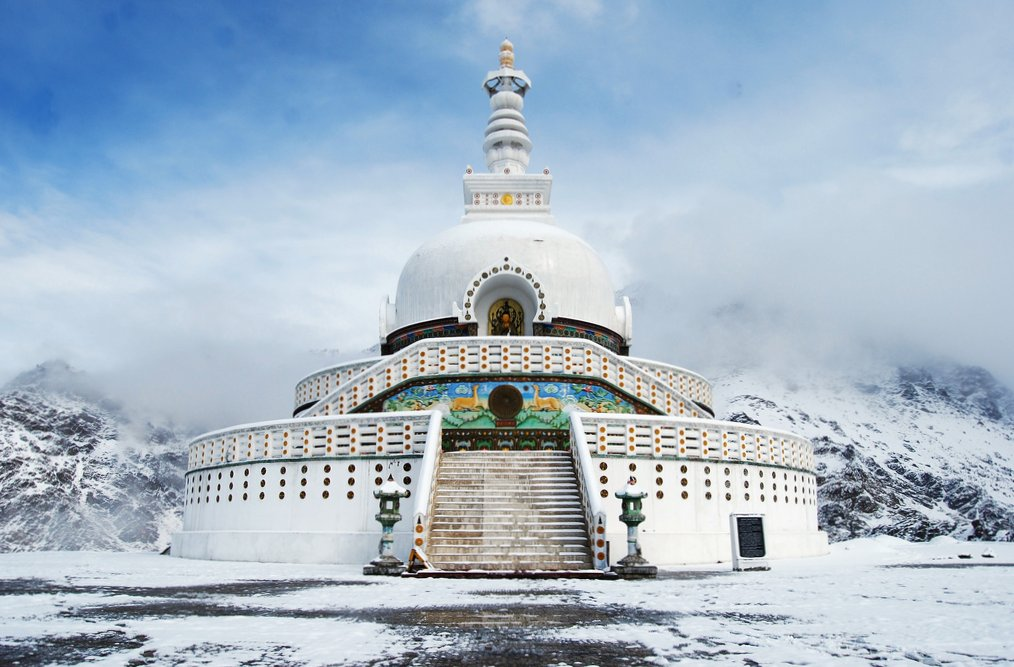
Shanti Stupa

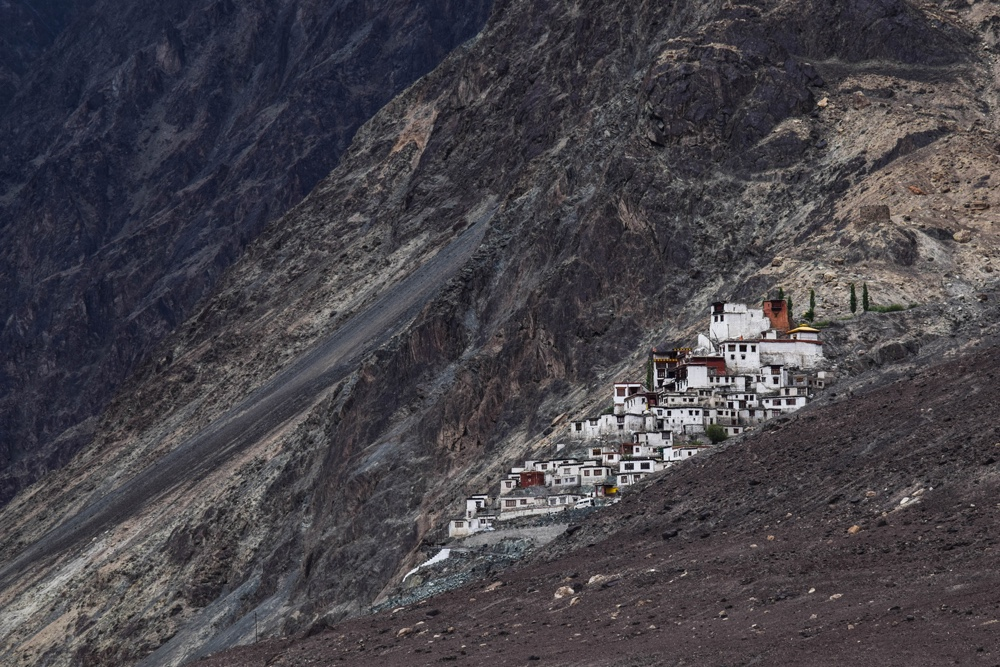
Sankar Gompa and village

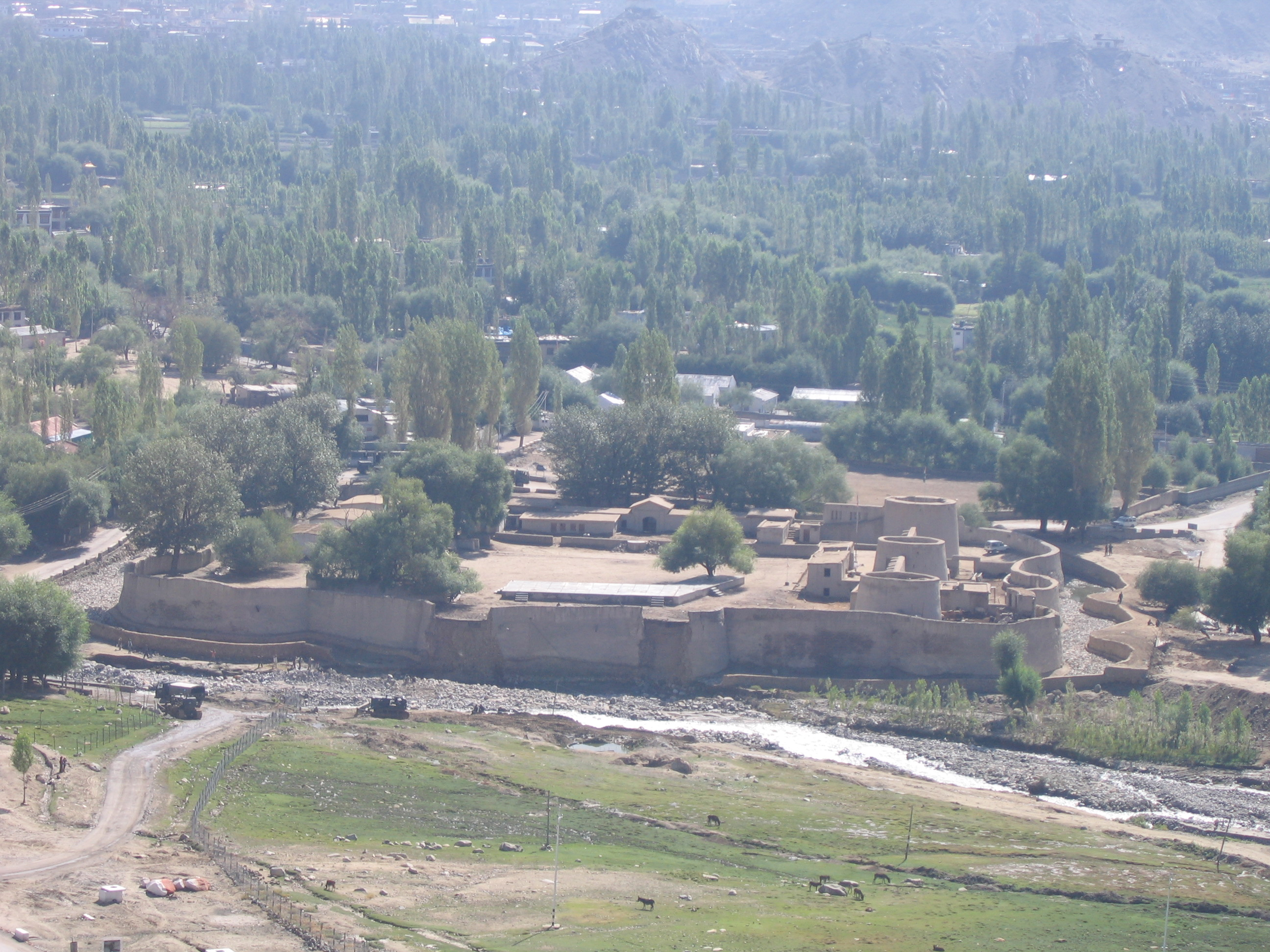
Zorawar Fort

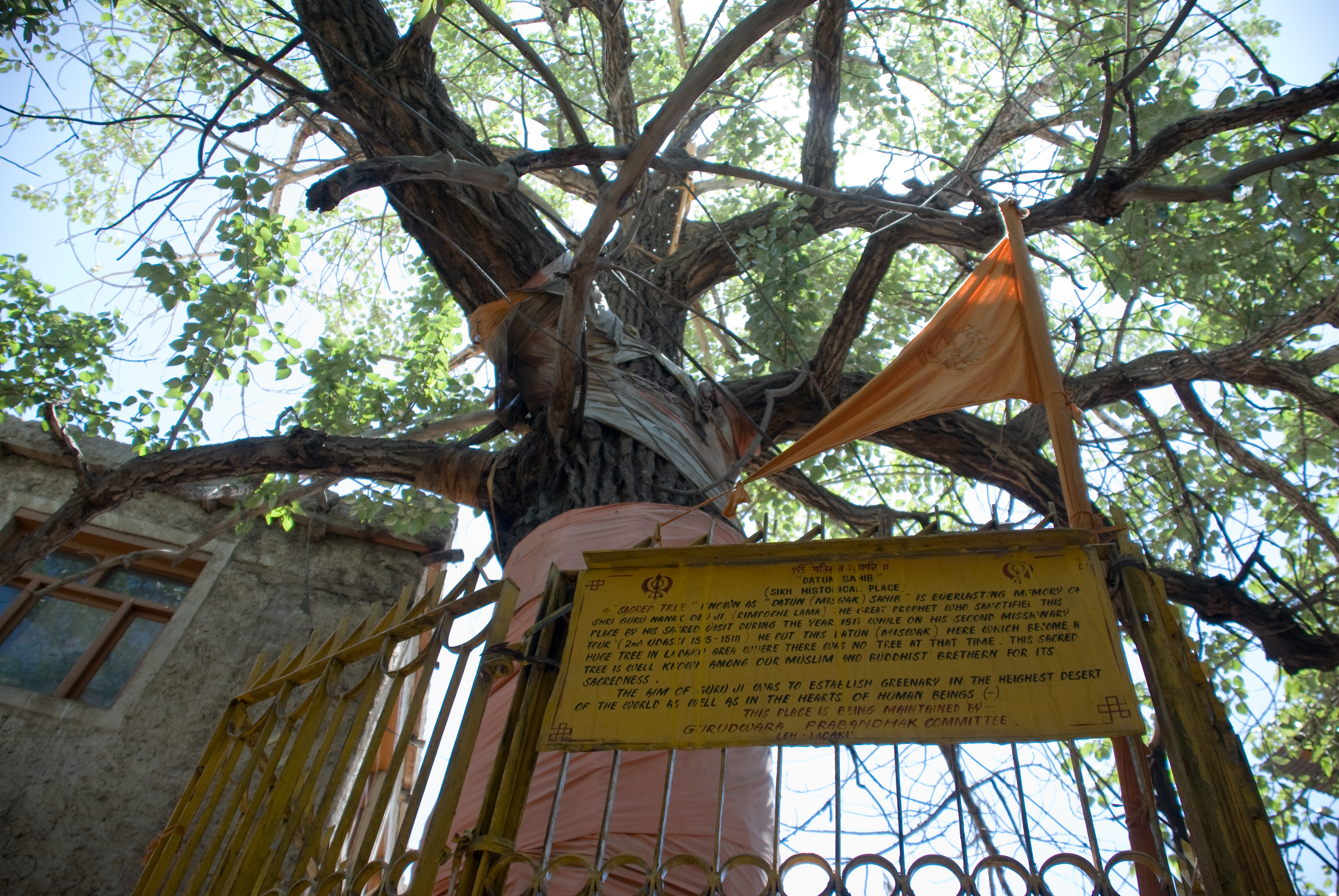
Datun Sahib

view of Leh City from Old castle

=== Buddhist monasteries ===
- Namgyal Gompa (also called "Tsemo Gompa" (Red Gompa), or dGon-pa-so-ma (New Monastery), a temple, is the main Buddhist centre in Leh. There are some older walls of fortifications behind it which Francke reported were once known as the "Dard Castle." If it was indeed built by Dards, it must pre-date the establishment of Tibetan rulers in Ladakh over a thousand years ago.
- Sankar Labrang (Bsam dkar bla brang) is a small, two-storeyed building owned by Sankar monastery. "Sankar monastery is the seat of Bakula Rinpoche, immediately to the northwest of Leh. The monastery's Labrang building is located in the old town of Leh, in the Manikhang neighbourhood. Manikhang is the area between the main bazaar of Leh and the historic Stalam path that leads up to the royal palace. Four huge stūpas standing at this point mark the beginning of historic Leh. In recent memory, the Sankar Labrang had a metalsmith's workshop downstairs, while upstairs lived the monk caretaker of the White Maitreya Temple (Byams khang dkar po), also known locally as "Street Maitreya". The White Maitreya Temple dates back to the reign of King Drakpa Bumd´e (Grags pa 'bum lde, r. ca 1410–1435), following the arrival of a mission sent to Ladakh by the Tibetan lama Tsongkhapa".
- Chamba monasteries (Byams-pa, i.e., Maitreya) and Chenrezig (sPyan-ras-gzigs, i.e. Avalokiteshvara) monasteries which are of uncertain date.
- Stone Maitreya of Leh

=== Annual Sindhu Darshan Festival ===
Every year Sindhu Darshan Festival is held at Shey, 15 km from town, to promote religious harmony and the glory of the Sindhu river. Many tourists come to Leh for this.

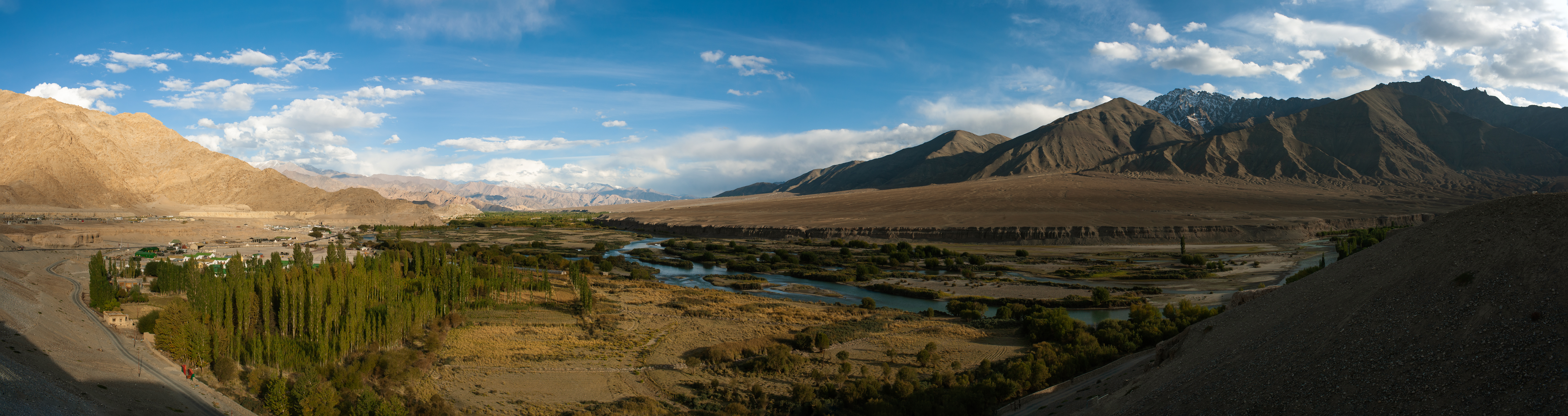
The Indus River in Leh

== Transport ==
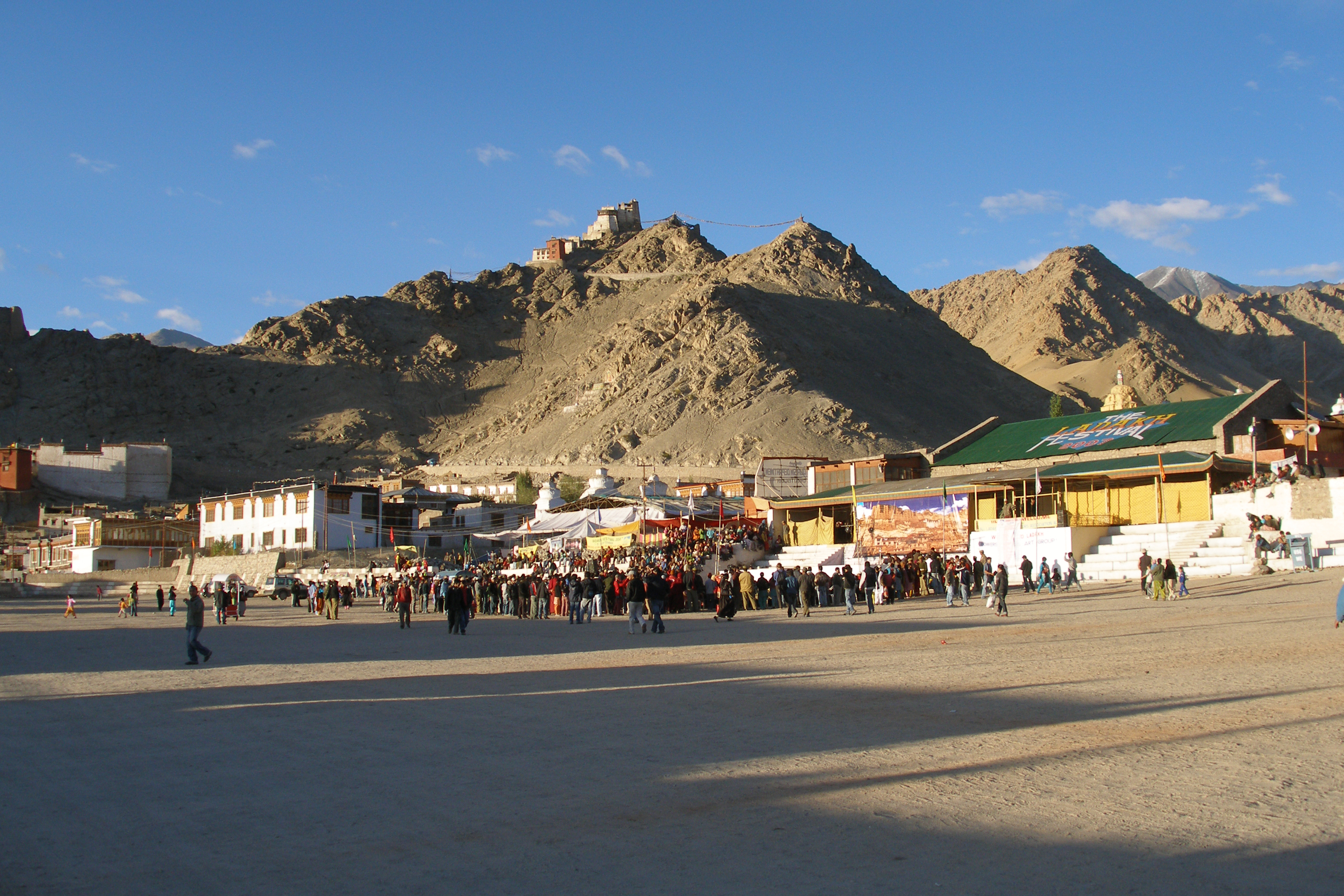
Leh City Market

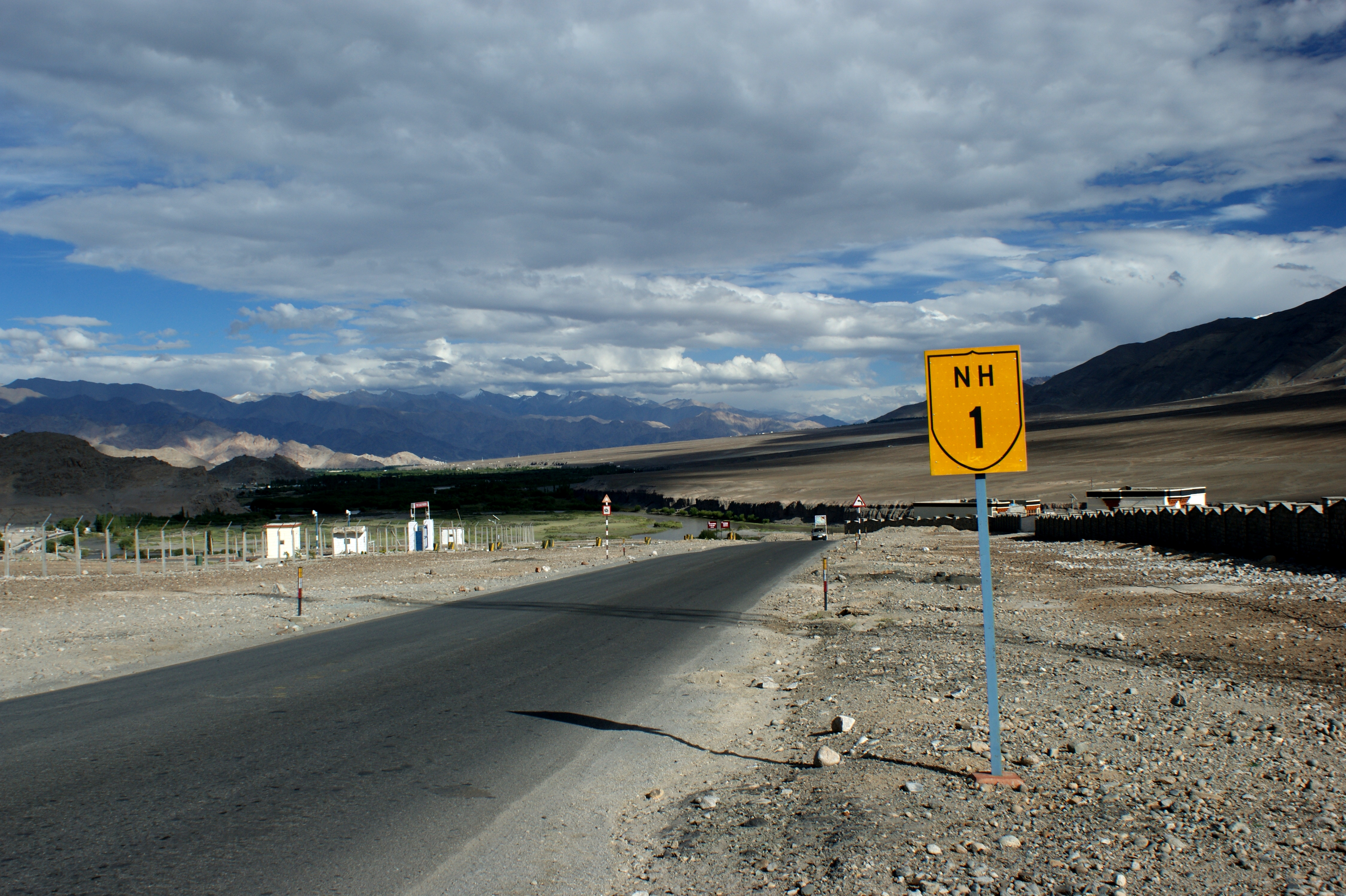
National Highway 1 near Leh

=== Road ===
==== Modern highways ====
- NH-1 Srinagar-Kargil-Leh Highway:

434-km long route from Kashmir valley, via the Zoji-la (3,505-metre-high (11,499 ft), tunnel is being constructed for all-weather connectivity). The Jammu and Kashmir State Road Transport Corporation (JKSRTC) operates regular deluxe and ordinary bus services between Srinagar and Leh on this route, with an overnight halt at Kargil. Taxis (cars and jeeps) are also available at Srinagar for the journey.

- NH-3 Leh-Manali Highway:

Since 1989, the 473-kilometre-long (294 mi) Leh-Manali Highway has served as the second road to Ladakh. Open from June to late October, this high road traverses the upland desert plateaux of Rupshu, whose altitude ranges from 3,660 m (12,010 ft) to 4,570 m (14,990 ft). There are a number of high passes enroute among which the highest one, known as Tanglang La (5,325 metres (17,470 ft)) As of 2025-26, tunnels are being constructed on this route for all-weather connectivity.

- Nimmu–Padam–Darcha road:

As of 2026, this third all-weather road to Leh is currently under construction including the under-construction Shunku La Tunnel which will provide all-weather connectivity.

- Hanle-Kaza-Tabo Road (partially overlaps with the 125 km long Kiato-Karzok Road):

This highway is being constructed as the fourth all-weather road to Ladakh, connecting Kaza in Spiti Valley in Himachal Pradesh) through the Takling La Tunnel (5575 m) to Ladakh. A road is being constructed over the Takling La, and simultaneously a tunnel will also be built under the Takling La for the all-weather connectivity from mainland India to Hanley and beyond in Ladakh for which DPR is being prepared.

==== Historic routes ====
Traditional trade routes have traditionally converged on Leh from all four directions.

- The route from Srinagar was roughly the same as the road that today crosses the Zoji La (pass) to Kargil, then up the Indus Valley to Leh.
- From Baltistan there were two difficult routes: the main one ran up the Shyok Valley from the Indus, over a pass and then down the Hanu River to the Indus again below Khalsi (Khalatse).
- From Baltistan, the other traditional route ran from Skardu straight up the Indus to Kargil and on to Leh. Both summer and winter routes ran from Leh to Yarkand via the Karakoram Pass and Xaidulla.
- A couple of possible routes also ran from Leh to Lhasa.
- The historic caravan route from Leh to Yarkand was an important commercial link between northern India and Central Asia. Merchants from Kashmir and Punjab travelled through the Karakoram Pass to trade in Yarkand, where many stayed in lodging houses known as *serais*. The historical place names **Gurdial Sarai** and **Kashmir Kucha** (Kashmir Lane) in Yarkand reflect the presence of Indian trading communities. The journey from Leh to Yarkand generally took nearly a month.

=== Air ===
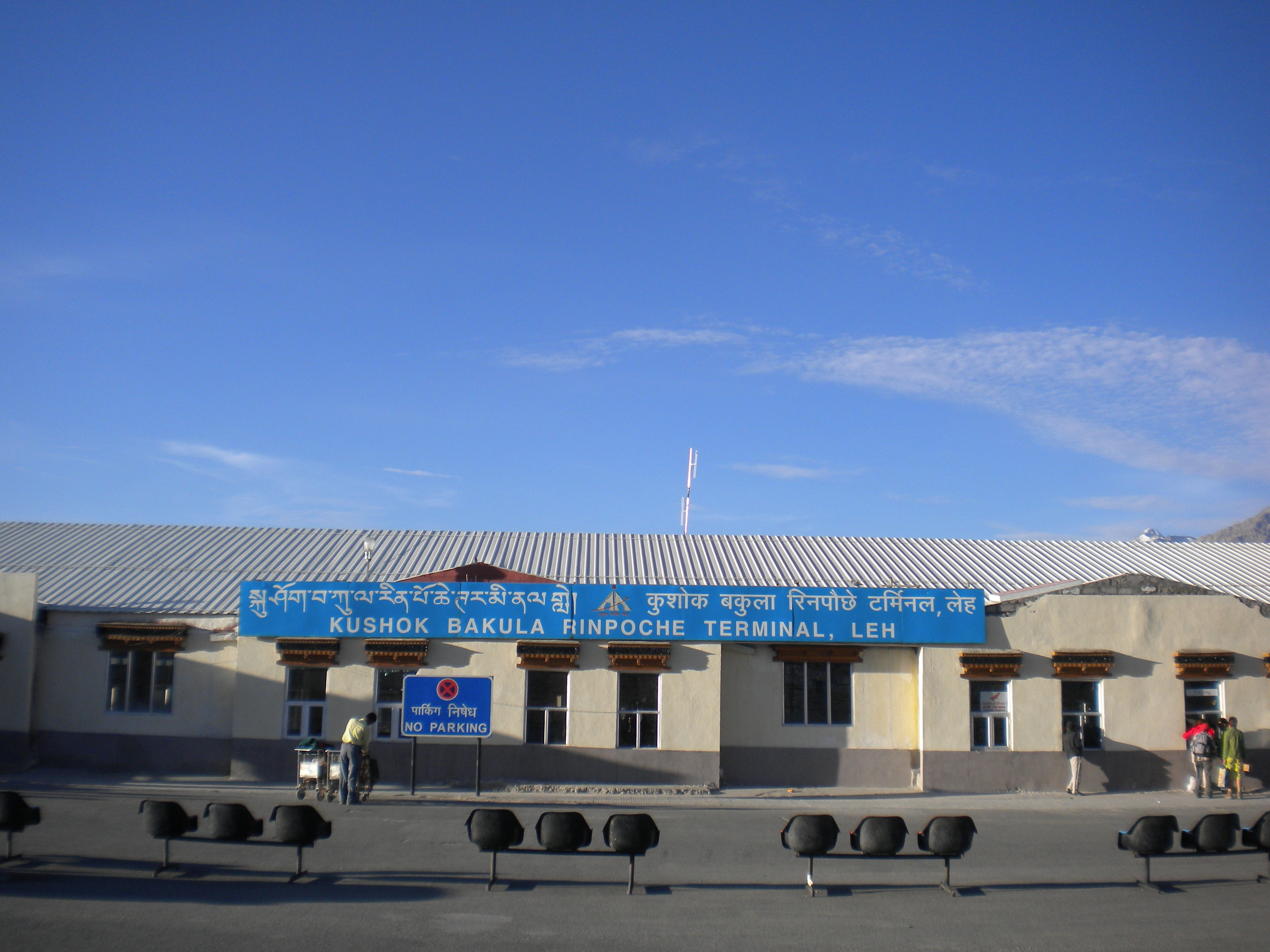
Leh Kushok Bakula Rimpochee Airport

Leh Kushok Bakula Rimpochee Airport has flights to and from Delhi, Jammu, Srinagar and Chandigarh. Air India, SpiceJet, and IndiGo operate Delhi to Leh daily with multiple flights at peak times.

=== Rail ===
There is currently no railway service in Ladakh, but two railway routes are proposed: the Bhanupli–Leh line and Srinagar–Kargil–Leh line.

== Education ==
- Ladakh University
- Students' Educational and Cultural Movement of Ladakh
- Central Institute of Buddhist Studies

== See also ==
- Kashmir
  - Dal Lake
  - Gangabal
  - Gulmarg
  - Pahalgam
  - Mughal Road
  - Sonmarg
- Ladakh and Baltistan
  - Zanskar
  - Skardu
  - Kargil
  - Khaplu
  - Dras
