= Shankar =

Sankar or Shankar is a Sanskrit word meaning "beneficent" or "giver of bliss" and may refer to:

== Religion ==
- Shiva, a Hindu deity

== People ==
- Shankar (name)
  - Ravi Shankar, Indian sitarist and composer
  - Shankar (actor), Indian actor
  - Shankar (Tamil militant), Tamil rebel
  - Shankar (cartoonist), Indian cartoonist
  - Shankar (writer), Indian writer
  - Shankar–Ganesh, an Indian music director duo who worked in Tamil, Telugu, and Kannada movies
  - Shankar Dayal Sharma, President of India from 1992 to 1997
  - K. Shankar, Indian film director, screenwriter and editor
  - S. Shankar or Shankar, Indian film director, film producer and screenwriter
  - Shankar, fictional protagonist of the 1998 Indian film Gunda portrayed by Mithun Chakraborty

== Places ==
- Shankar, Jalandhar, a village located in Jallandhar, Punjab, India
- Shankar, Iran, a village in Sistan and Baluchestan Province, Iran
- Shankar Vihar, neighborhood of Delhi, India
  - Shankar Vihar metro station

== See also ==
- Shankar's International Dolls Museum, New Delhi
- Shankar's Weekly, a magazine founded by K. Shankar Pillai
- Shankar Party unofficial name given to the Adhyatmik Ishwariya Vishwa Vidyalaya
- Shankar Guru (disambiguation)
- Sankar (disambiguation)
- Shankara (disambiguation)
- Shanker, a surname
- Sankara (disambiguation)
- Shenkar (disambiguation)
- Shankari (disambiguation)
