= Sankara =

Sankara can refer to:

== People ==
- Adi Shankara (788–820), Hindu philosopher credited with reviving Hinduism
- Danladi Abdullahi Sankara (born 1954), Nigerian politician and senator
- Mariam Sankara (born 1953), First Lady of Burkina Faso, widow of Thomas Sankara
- Thomas Sankara (1949–1987), Marxist revolutionary leader of Burkina Faso (from 1983–1987)
- Sankara Karamoko (born 2003), Ivorian footballer

== Films ==
- Sankara (2007 film), a Sri Lankan film directed by Prasanna Jayakody
- Shankara (2016 film), a 2016 Indian Telugu-language action film by Tatineni Satya

== Other ==
- Sankhara, mental formations in Buddhist philosophy
- Sankara, Burkina Faso, a village in Burkina Faso
- Sankara Eye Foundation, a US-based non-profit working to eradicate curable blindness in India
- Sankara Stones, magical rocks from the 1984 feature film Indiana Jones and the Temple of Doom
- Shiva, whom Hindus, especially Shaivites, worship as supreme God or their Supreme Being

== See also ==
- Sankar (disambiguation)
- Shankara (disambiguation)
- Shankar (disambiguation)
