= Shenkar =

Shenkar may refer to:

- Shenkar, the stage name for L. Shankar (born 1950), Indian violinist, singer, and composer Arie Shenkar (1877–1953), founder of the Manufacturers Association of Israel
  - The Shenkar College of Engineering, Design and Art, a college in Ramat-Gan, Israel named for him
- Louis Schanker (1903–1981), American abstract artist

== See also ==
- Shankar (disambiguation)
