= Shanker =

Shanker is a surname. Notable people with the surname include:

- Albert Shanker (1928–1997), president of the American Federation of Teachers
- Baggy Shanker, British politician
- Natarajan Shankar, computer scientist at SRI International, USA
- Ram Shanker (born 1985), Singaporean footballer
- Sasi Shanker (1957–2016), Indian film director
- S. Shankar or S. Shanker (born 1963), Indian film director, film producer and screenwriter

== See also ==
- Shankar (disambiguation)
