= Nanga Sago =

Highest point
- Elevation: 5,776 m (18,950 ft)
- Coordinates: 34°13′54.25″N 77°39′53.47″E

Geography
- Location: Ladakh, India

Nanga Sago is a mountain situated 15 km north of Leh, capital of Ladakh in India. Its altitude is 5776m (18950 feet).
