= Shankar Guru =

Shankar Guru may refer to these Indian films:

- Shankar Guru (1978 film), a Kannada-language film directed by V. Somashekhar
- Sankar Guru (1987 film), a Tamil-language film directed by Raja

== See also ==
- Shankar (disambiguation)
- Guru (disambiguation)
