= Sankar Monastery =

Buddhist monastery in Ladakh, India

Coordinates: 34°10′27″N 77°35′07″E

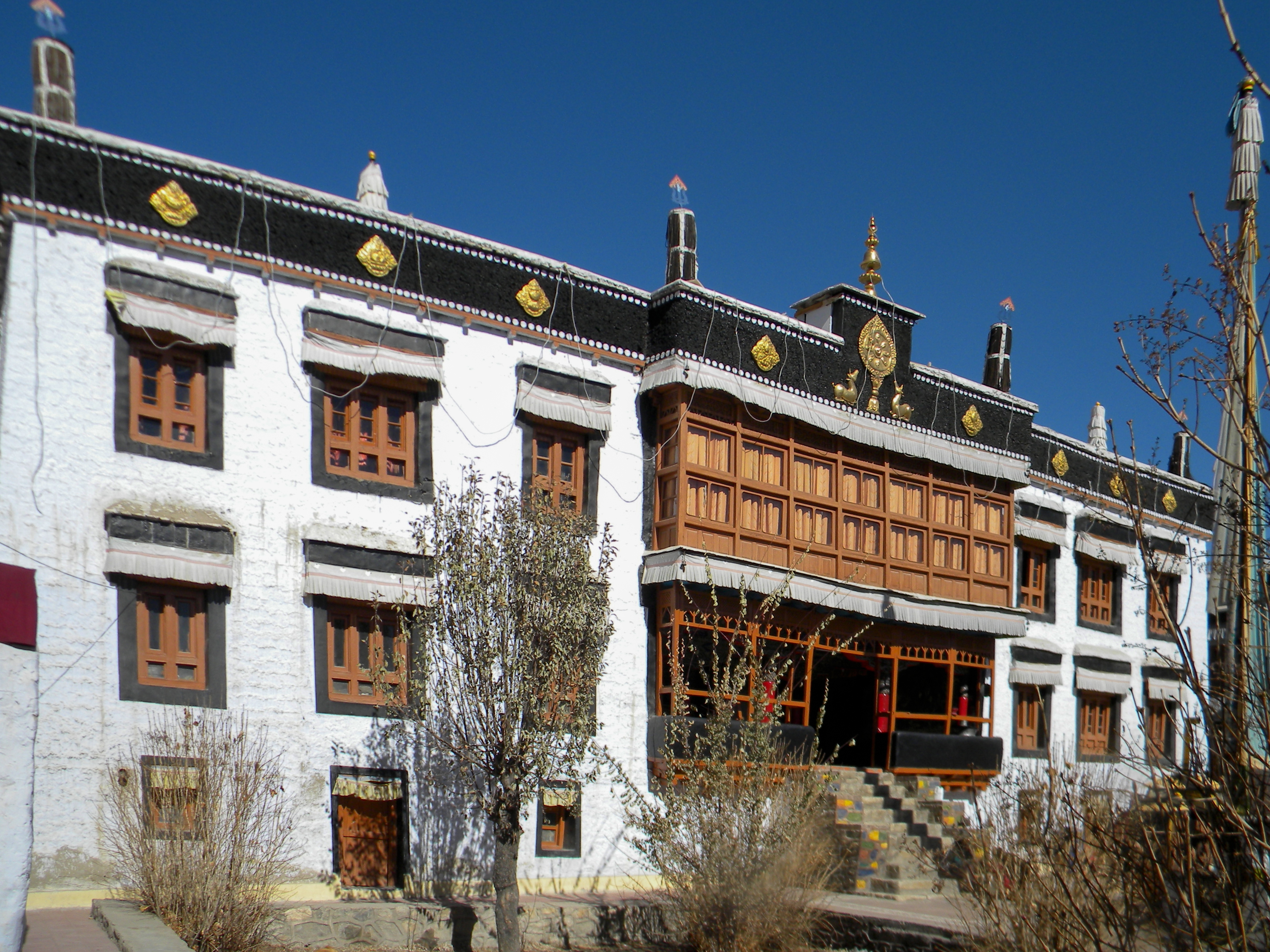
- Sankar Monastery

- Location within India

Religion
- Affiliation: Tibetan Buddhism
- Sect: Gelugpa

Location
- Location: Ladakh, India

Sankar Monastery, or Sankar Gompa is a Buddhist monastery within an easy half-hour walk from Leh in Ladakh, northern India. It is a daughter-establishment of the Spituk Monastery and the residence of the Abbot of Spituk, the Venerable Kushok Bakula, who is the senior incarnate lama of Ladakh due to his ancient lineage and personal authority.

== Description ==
Sankar Monastery consists of a relatively modern, attractive cluster of buildings set amongst trees above the town, in the lee of Khardung La, a 5,359 m (17,582 ft) pass behind Leh leading to the Shyok and Nubra Valleys.

Visiting hours to the monastery are limited to early morning and evening because fewer than twenty monks live there permanently. Climbing the steps one reaches the double doors leading into the dukang (du khang) or assembly hall. Three green drums are on the right of the door under which is the place of the Gyeskos. The wall and entry door are richly painted. Upstairs is the Dukar Lhakang ("residence of the deity") or inner sanctuary, where there is a figure of Avalokiteśvara, or Chenrézik (Tibetan: སྤྱན་རས་གཟིགས), with 1,000 arms, all holding weapons, and 1,000 heads. The walls are painted with a Tibetan calendar, mandalas and rules for the monks. Above the wooden stairs, the rooms of the Abbot, guest rooms, and the library can be seen.

A lama from Sankar Monastery visits the mid-sixteenth century fort at Namgyal Tsemo, the peak above Leh, every morning and evening to maintain the temples associated with the fort and light the butter-lamps.

== See also ==
- List of buddhist monasteries in Ladakh
- Geography of Ladakh
- Tourism in Ladakh
- World Monuments Fund
