= Mahaguru =

Mahaguru or Maha Guru (great guru) may refer to:

== People ==
- Rinchen Zangpo (958–1055), translator of Sanskrit Buddhist texts into Tibetan

== Films and television ==
- Mahaguru (1985 film), Hindi film
- Mahaguru (2007 film), Bengali film
- Mahaguru, a fictional religious guru in the Indian superhero franchise Shaktiman

== See also ==
- Maha (disambiguation)
- Guru (disambiguation)
