= Shankara =

Shankara (also written as Sankara or Samkara, IAST śaṅkara) can refer to:

- Shiva, the Hindu god
- Adi Shankara, 8th-century Indian philosopher
- K. N. Shankara, Indian space scientist
- Shankaracharya (Shankara acharya), a commonly used title of heads of maţhas (monasteries) in the Advaita tradition of Hindu philosophy
- Shankara (raga), a raga in Indian classical music
- Shankara (1991 film), a 1991 Indian Hindi-language film starring Sunny Deol
- Shankara (2016 film), an Indian Telugu-language film
- Shankara, Purulia, a census town in West Bengal, India

== See also ==
- Sankara (disambiguation)
- Sankar (disambiguation)
- Shankar (disambiguation)
- Rag Shankara, Rag Mala in Jogia, 1990 album by Ram Narayan
