= Namgyal Tsemo Monastery =

Buddhist monastery in Leh, Ladakh, India

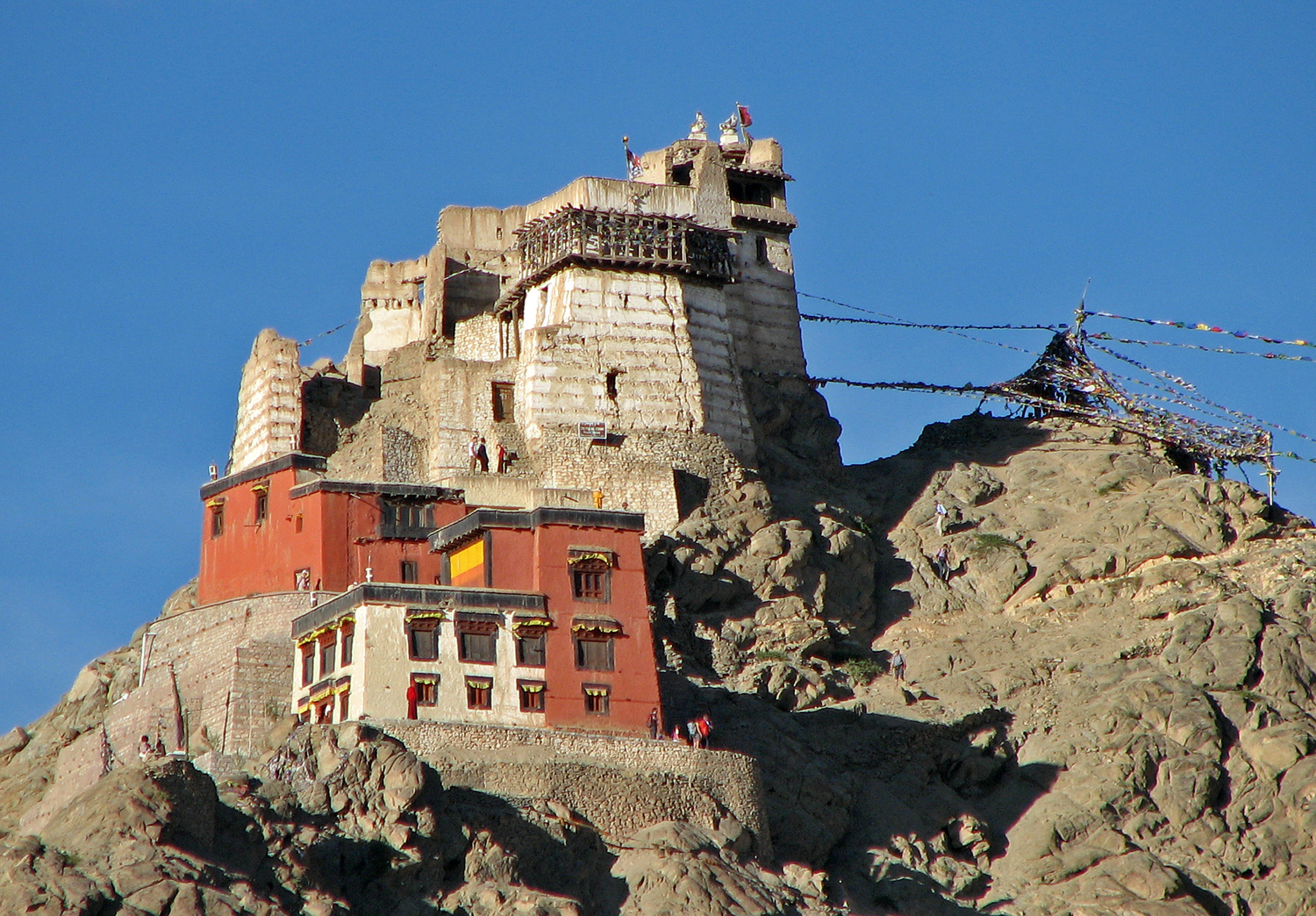
- Namgyal Tsemo Monastery

- Location within Ladakh

Religion
- Affiliation: Tibetan Buddhism
- Sect: Gelug

Location
- Location: Leh district, Ladakh, India
- Country: India
- Interactive map of Namgyal Tsemo Monastery
- Coordinates: 34°10′3″N 77°35′24″E

Architecture
- Founder: Tashi Namgyal
- Completed: 1430; 596 years ago

Namgyal Tsemo Monastery or Namgyal Tsemo Gompa is a Buddhist monastery in Leh city of Leh district, Ladakh, northern India. Founded by King Tashi Namgyal (1555-1575) of Ladakh, it has a three-story high gold statue of Maitreya Buddha and ancient manuscripts and frescoes. It is situated near the Tsemo Castle.

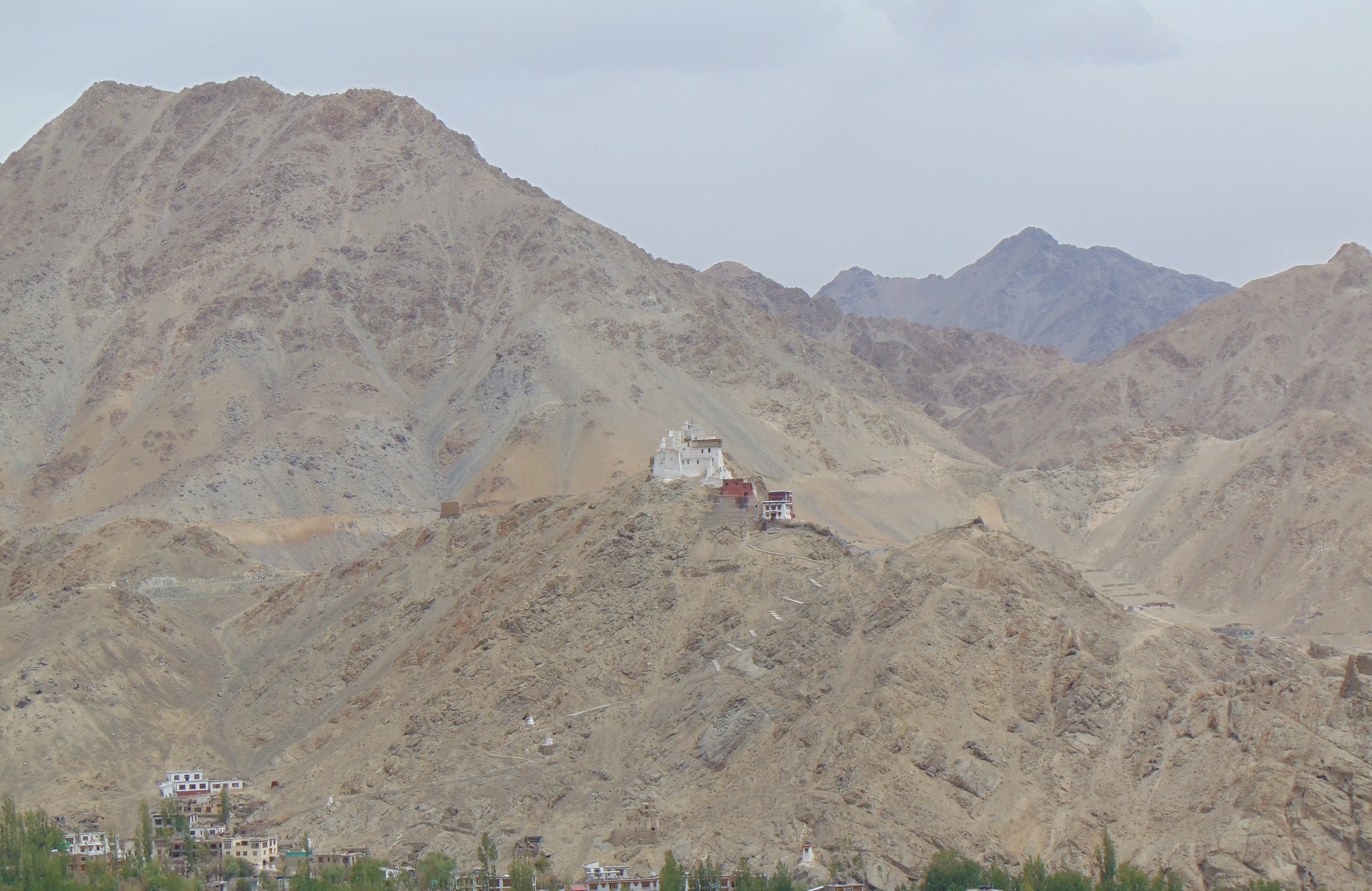
Namgyal Tsemo Monastery perched over Leh town

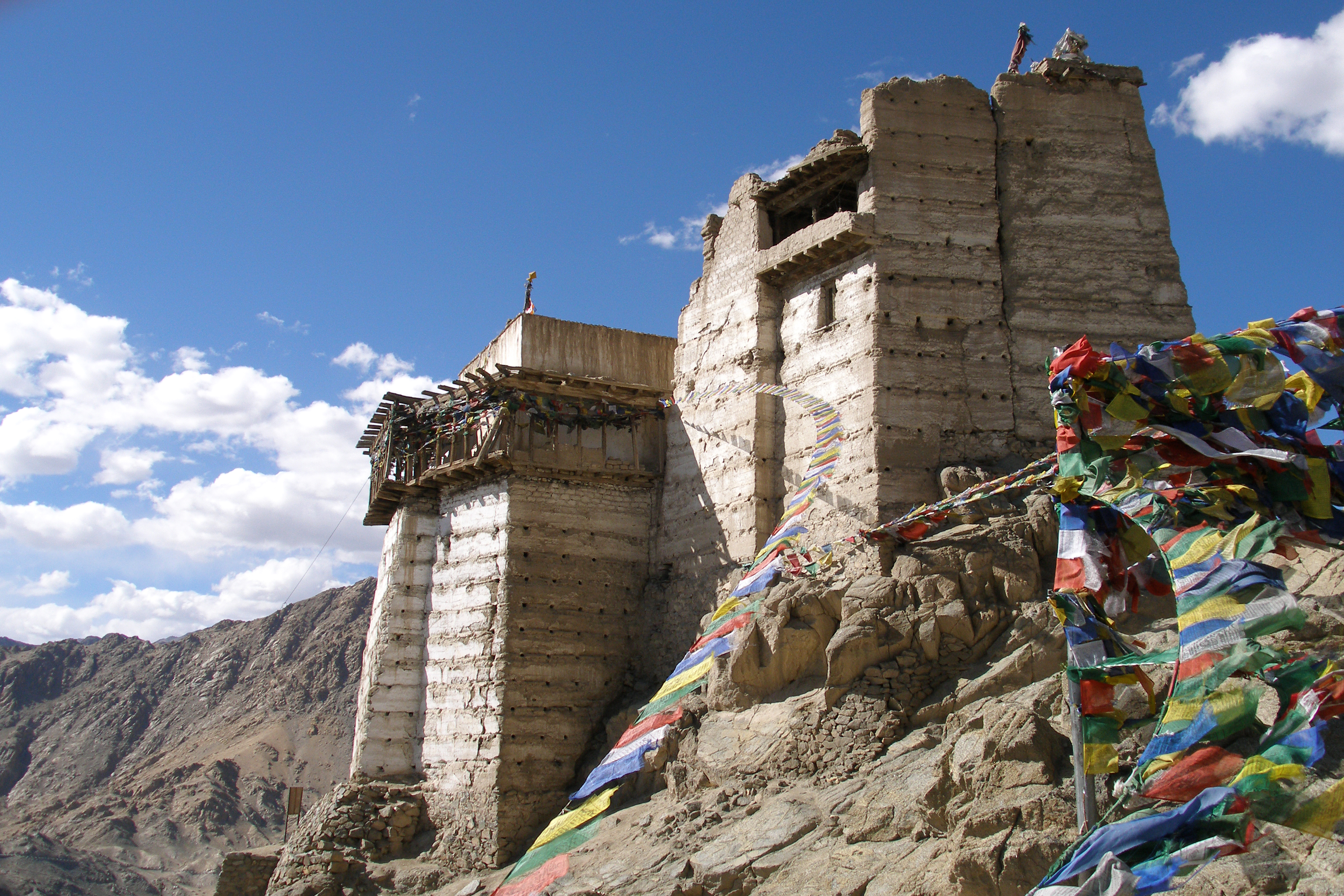
Tsemo Castle

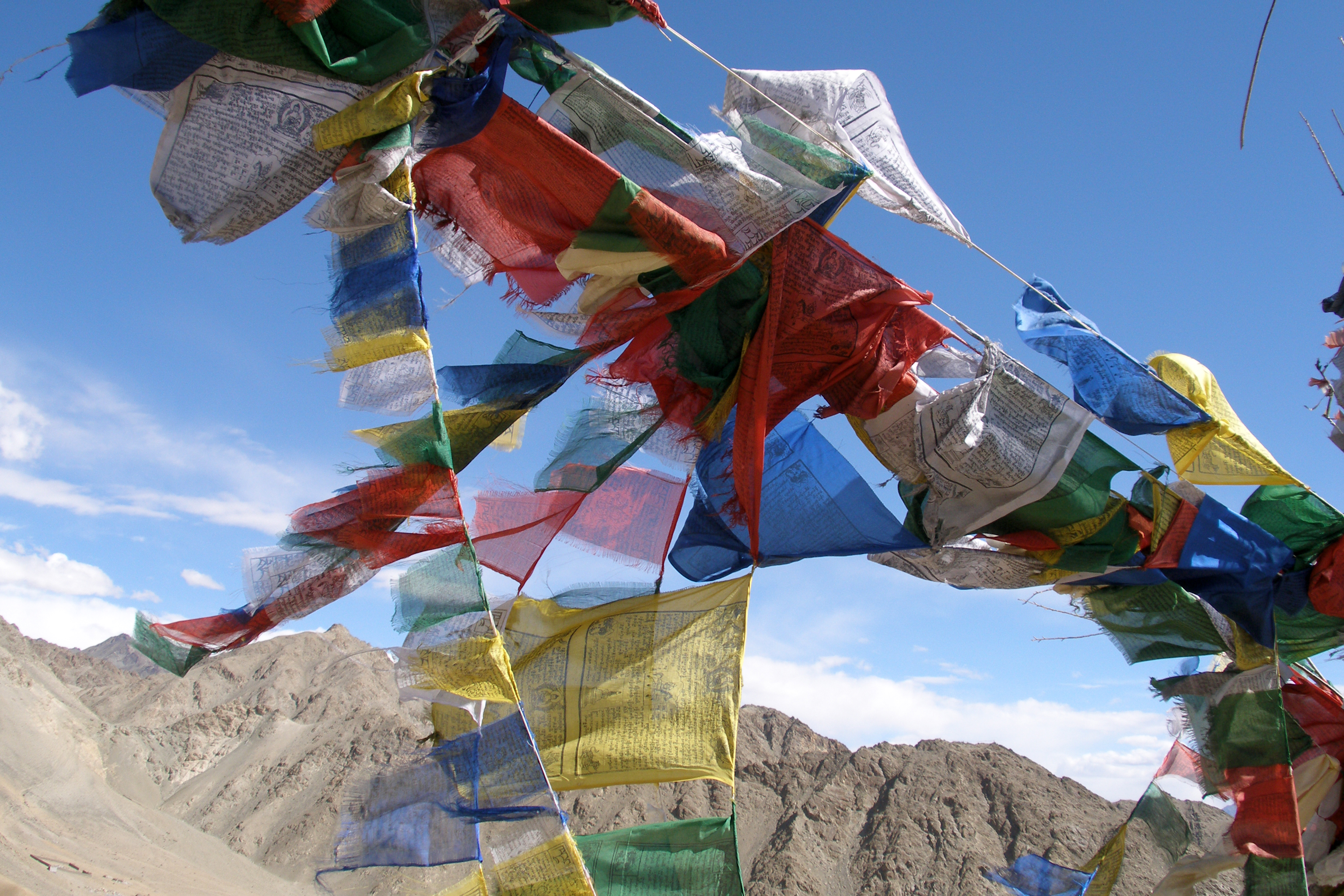
Prayer flags

== See also ==
- List of buddhist monasteries in Ladakh
- Geography of Ladakh
- Tourism in Ladakh
