= Guruji (surname) =

Guruji (Hindi: गुरुजी) is a surname. Notable people with the surname include:

- Mahadaji Pant Guruji, Indian accountant, Special Envoy of Peshwas, tutor and advisor of Peshwa Madhavrao I and Sawai Madhavrao
