= Guru, Iran =

Guru گورو
- Village
- Location within Iran
- Coordinates: 28°57′45″N 57°59′26″E
- Country: Iran
- Province: Kerman
- County: Bam
- Bakhsh: Central
- Rural District: Howmeh

Population (2006)
  - Total: 46
- Time zone: UTC+3:30 (IRST)
  - Summer (DST): UTC+4:30 (IRDT)

Guru (Persian: گورو, also Romanized as Gūrū; also known as Gavarū’īyeh) is a village in Howmeh Rural District, in the Central District of Bam County, Kerman Province, Iran. At the 2006 census, its population was 46, in 15 families.
