= GuRoo =

GuRoo is a humanoid robot developed at the Mobile Robotics Laboratory in the School of Information Technology and Electrical Engineering at the University of Queensland. The design of the GuRoo is based on the human form and it is kept as anthropomorphic as possible. GuRoo is completely autonomous. It is used for research in different areas including dynamic stability, human-robot interaction and machine learning. GuRoo competes in the annual RoboCup. The goal of this competition is to foster the development of robotics through an annual soccer competition. It is the dream of the RoboCup federation to develop a team of fully autonomous humanoid robots, to play against and beat the human team that wins the World Cup in the year 2050.

== Specifications ==
Mechanical

GuRoo was designed with the proportions of a child of approximately six years of age. The robot is able to interface with typical human environments such as bench tops and door handles. The mechanical design began in 2001 as an undergraduate thesis project. SolidEdge a solid modeling package was used to draft all sections of the robot under construction, it took physical form one year later. The majority of the structure is made of 3mm aluminium plate and angle sections. The structure is heavily milled to reduce weight and improve airflow over the motors and power electronics.

Electro Mechanical

In an effort to mimic the human body, the GuRoo has been built with 23 degrees of freedom. The actuators chosen tended towards a high torque/low speed combination to suit the anthropomorphic nature of human locomotion. In addition, no joint is required to move through more than one complete revolution. The GuRoo stands 1.2 m tall and weighs 38 kg with batteries.

The high power necessary for the lower limbs and spine was realised with brushed DC motors, for cost reasons and ease of implementation, all lower joints use the same motor/ gearhead combination. The Maxon RE 32 series motor wound for a nominal 32V in combinations with a ceramic 156:1, 72% efficient, planetary gearhead is used. The maximum continuous output torque available is 10Nm with maximum speed of 5.3 rad/s at 2 amps of current consumption. Maximum intermittently permissible torque available is 22.5Nm at 4a. The length of the motors dictated the width of GuRoo's legs. The high-powered motors made up 33% of the total weight of the robot.

Low power, low weight, and ease of controllability were the factors in choosing the actuators for the upper limbs. The RC servo motors used are Hi-Tech HS705-MG, capable of 1.4Nm output torque at speeds of 5.2 rad/s at 5V. Intrinsic metal gear boxes allow a relatively large output torque from a small package. Each servo weights 0.125 kg. Each motor has an internal close loop control systems but does not provide feedback to the main GuRoo controller. Digital servo motors, providing additional extra torque and accuracy, are being implemented in the head and neck.

If the robot is un-powered and lifted off the ground, the legs will naturally swing together as the centre of mass of the leg is outside of the hip joint. Additional torsion springs with a spring constant 1Nm/degree are located in parallel with the hip roll actuators to prevent this from occurring. The springs are set such that when un-powered, the legs of the robot hang straight down. The additional torque from the spring also alleviates the stress on the hip roll motor during the single support phase of a typical walking gait.

As might be expected, GuRoo can only approximate many human movements. One of the obvious is the crudely copied flexible spine. A human spine has 24 vertebrae distributed along the entire length that enables flexible motion, as opposed to the GuRoo, who has only three orthogonal actuators. Ball joints are also present in human hips and shoulders and allow high mobility actuated form a small volume. Due to the nature of the actuators used, ball joints were difficult to implement. Instead, multiple degrees of freedom have been achieved with small sequential links. All degrees of freedom are orthogonal when the robot is in a standing position.

Technical specifications
| DOF | 6 in each leg; 3 in each arm; 3 in waist; 2 in neck |
| Battery | Lithium Ion, 42V and 7.2V |
| Sensors | 1 X Inertial Measurement Unit; 2 X Cameras (640x480 @ 80fps); 23 Joint encoders; 8 x Capacitive force sensors |
| CPU | VIA C3 1.2 GHz |
| Display | 7" LCD touch screen |

== Name's origin ==
It is a tradition of all University of Queensland robotic soccer team to suffix -roo on their name, over the years there have been RoboRoos, ViperRoos and CrocaRoos. GuRoo stands for "Grossly Underfunded Roo" a reference to the small budget of the project.

== Dimensions ==
- 1.2 metres tall (apx. 3 ft 11 in)
- 38 kilograms (84 pounds)
