= Sankar, Nepal =

Coordinates: 29.2200°N 80.2500°E

Sankarpur
- Village development committee
- Interactive map of Sankarpur
- Country: Nepal
- Zone: Mahakali Zone
- District: Baitadi District

Population (1991)
  - Total: 1,964
  - Religions: Hindu
- Time zone: UTC+5:45 (Nepal Time)

Sankar is a village development committee in Baitadi District in the Mahakali Zone of western Nepal. At the time of the 1991 Nepal census it had a population of 1,964 and had 404 houses in the village.
