= Jammu and Kashmir State Road Transport Corporation =

Public transport corporation in Jammu & Kashmir, India

Jammu & Kashmir Road Transport Corporation
- Parent: Ministry of Transportation, Government of Jammu and Kashmir
- Founded: In 1948 as Road Transport Corporation
- Defunct: August 2019
- Headquarters: JKRTC Head Office, Srinagar Jammu & Kashmir, India
- Locale: Jammu & Kashmir
- Service area: Jammu & Kashmir, Himachal Pradesh, Punjab, Haryana, Delhi, Rajasthan, Uttar Pradesh
- Service type: Bus service
- Depots: 10
- Fleet: 373
- Fuel type: Diesel

Jammu and Kashmir Road Transport Corporation (JKRTC), formerly known as the Jammu and Kashmir State Road Transport Corporation (JKSRTC), is a public sector undertaking of the Government of Jammu and Kashmir that provides road transport services within the Union Territory of Jammu and Kashmir (J&K) and to adjacent states. The corporation serves as a critical economic lifeline by providing an efficient, integrated transport system for the general public, tourism, and trade, while ensuring the delivery of essential commodities under the Public Distribution System (PDS) to remote regions including Kargil and the Kashmir Valley. In addition to internal routes with J&K, JKSRTC operates inter-state services connecting Jammu and Kashmir with Punjab, Haryana, Himachal Pradesh, Uttar Pradesh, Delhi, and Rajasthan.

== History ==
=== 1948: Early years ===
The Jammu and Kashmir State Road Transport Corporation (JKSRTC) originated from the urgent logistical needs of the state following the 1947 conflict. With the closure of the strategic Kohala Bridge in 1947, essential supply lines were severed, leaving the fleets of prominent private operators—including Allied Chirag Din and Sons, Nanda Bus Service, and N.D. Radhakrishan—stranded outside the state's new borders. The resulting collapse of the transport system led to a severe shortage of food grains and essential commodities. When private transporters proved unable or unwilling to meet the emergency requirements for refugee evacuation and supply distribution, the state administration resorted to commandeering vehicles and, in some instances, detaining non-cooperative operators. To establish a reliable public distribution link, the government founded the Government Transport Undertaking (GTU) on 5 January 1948 (formally commissioned on 1 June 1948).

=== 1976–1990: Transition to the statutory corporation ===
Formally established on 1 September 1976 under the "Road Transport Corporations Act, 1950", the Jammu and Kashmir State Road Transport Corporation (JKSRTC) succeeded the Government Transport Undertaking (GTU) and spent its first decade institutionalizing infrastructure through central workshops in Jammu and Pampore while expanding its interstate footprint to hubs like Delhi, Chandigarh, and Amritsar to support the state’s horticultural exports.

=== 1990–2005: Strategic role during conflict ===
During the 1990s, JKSRTC transitioned into a "strategic lifeline," ensuring the transport of essential commodities along NH 1A under military escort and providing critical logistical support to the Batalik and Dras sectors during the 1999 Kargil War. In 2005, the corporation's role expanded to include the operation of the historic Srinagar–Muzaffarabad Bus, a key confidence-building measure between India and Pakistan.

=== 2006–2018: Financial challenges and modernisation ===
Facing significant financial distress by the mid-2000s due to an aging fleet and high costs on non-profitable "social necessity" routes, the corporation's market share of the state’s total bus fleet plummeted to approximately 1.45% by 2018–19. To counter this decline, a 2015 modernization drive introduced "Super Luxury" Volvo Buses, GPS tracking, and electronic ticketing, followed by the induction of electric buses in 2019 under the "FAME India Scheme".

=== 2019: Reorganisation and partition of assets for Ladakh's SIDCO operations ===
Following the Jammu and Kashmir Reorganisation Act, 2019, which bifurcated the state into two Union Territories (UT), a formal partition of the corporation's assets was initiated between Jammu and Kashmir and Ladakh. While the entity continued to operate as the Jammu and Kashmir Road Transport Corporation (JKRTC) within J&K, an audit and transition period followed to stabilize services and transfer infrastructure to the Ladakh administration.

On 1 April 2023, the Sindhu Infrastructure Development Corporation (SIDCO), a wholly-owned undertaking of the UT Ladakh Administration established in 2021, officially took over the public transport functions of JKRTC in the region. The transition included the transfer of existing diesel bus fleets, workshops, and transit depots to SIDCO, which now manages these services under the operational brand Ladakh Transport. As the primary state-owned transport provider in the territory, SIDCO operates local, intra-district, and inter-state routes connecting Ladakh with Himachal Pradesh and Jammu and Kashmir. Under the "Carbon Neutral Ladakh" initiative, SIDCO has prioritized green mobility by commissioning electric buses and India’s first high-altitude hydrogen fuel cell buses in collaboration with NTPC Limited. Additionally, SIDCO serves as the nodal agency for industrial infrastructure and financial lending for scheduled tribes and backward classes within the Ladakh Union Territory.

=== 2019-present: Modern era ===
Following the administrative changes in late 2019, the entity was officially renamed the Jammu and Kashmir Road Transport Corporation (JKRTC) to reflect its status as a Union Territory, subsequently achieving a landmark financial recovery with a ₹70.04 crore surplus by the 2024–25 fiscal year. To sustain this growth, the corporation initiated a public-private partnership asset monetization strategy, including the development of underutilized land and new Automated Testing Stations, while stabilizing its active fleet at 923 vehicles through the phase-out of over-aged units. Under its "Carbon Neutral" vision, JKRTC has integrated green mobility via electric buses and India’s first high-altitude hydrogen fuel cell fleet in Leh, supported by a digital transformation through an Intelligent Transport Management System (ITMS). This modernization encompasses real-time GPS tracking, online booking, and electronic ticketing machines to ensure operational transparency and safety across its passenger and load wings.

== Fleet ==
As of early 2026, the Jammu and Kashmir Road Transport Corporation (JKRTC) maintains a diversified fleet across its passenger and cargo (load) wings. To address historical issues with an aging and high-maintenance fleet, the corporation has undertaken a significant fleet renewal process, which included the auctioning of 237 over-aged vehicles during the 2024–25 fiscal year.

== See also ==
- Rail transport in Jammu and Kashmir
- Tourism in Jammu and Kashmir
- Tourism in Ladakh
- Geography of Ladakh
- Geology of the Himalayas
