= Savidan, Iran =

Savidan ساويدان
- Village
- Location within Iran
- Coordinates: 28°53′55″N 57°50′24″E
- Country: Iran
- Province: Kerman
- County: Jiroft
- Bakhsh: Jebalbarez
- Rural District: Maskun

Population (2006)
  - Total: 157
- Time zone: UTC+3:30 (IRST)
  - Summer (DST): UTC+4:30 (IRDT)

Savidan (Persian: ساويدان, also Romanized as Sāvīdān; also known as Gūrū) is a village in Maskun Rural District, Jebalbarez District, Jiroft County, Kerman Province, Iran. At the 2006 census, its population was 157, in 55 families.
