= Machoi Peak =

Mountain in Ladakh, India

Mechoi Peak
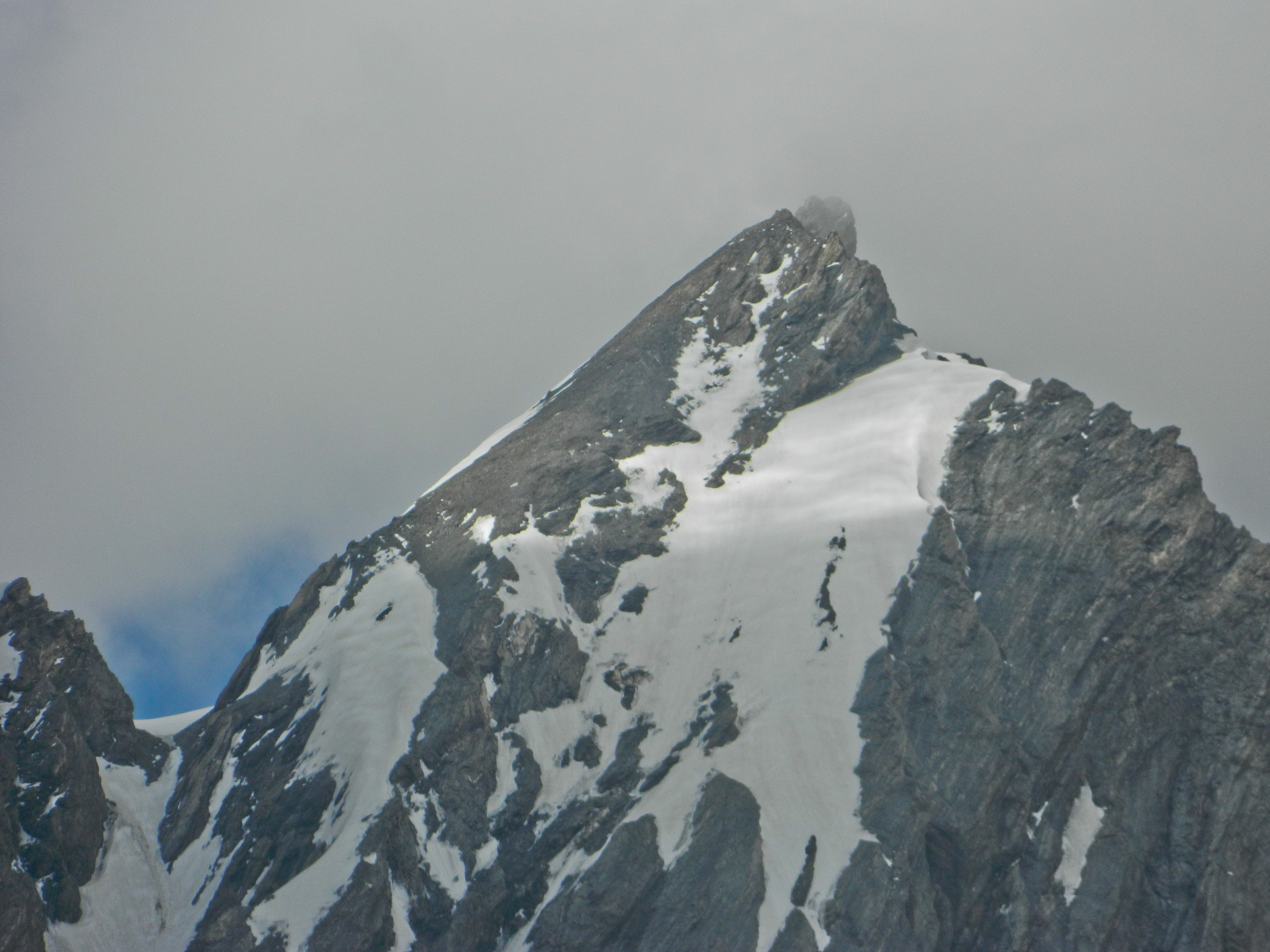
- Mechoi Peak, as seen on an overcast day, in 2013.

Highest point
- Elevation: 5,458 m (17,907 ft)
- Prominence: 681 m (2,234 ft)
- Coordinates: 34°15′26″N 75°32′08″E

Geography
- Location within Ladakh Location within Jammu and Kashmir Location within India
- Location: Drass Ladakh, India
- Parent range: Himalaya

Climbing
- First ascent: 10 September 1984; Indian army Team
- Easiest route: Right side of Amarnath cave

Mechoi Peak is a mountain with a peak elevation of 17,907 ft (5,458 metres), in Drass region of Ladakh, India. Mechoi Peak is part of the Himalaya Range, and is located between Amarnath cave and Zojila. It lies 105 km north east from Srinagar, 25 km from Sonamarg in the east and 30 km from Drass. It rises from the glacier of its name Mechoi Glacier and is the source of Dras River in Drass, Ladakh. Mechoi Peak rises from the Mechoi glacier and is a pyramid-shaped peak with ice falls and ice fields at its bottom and ridges.

== Climbing history and routes ==
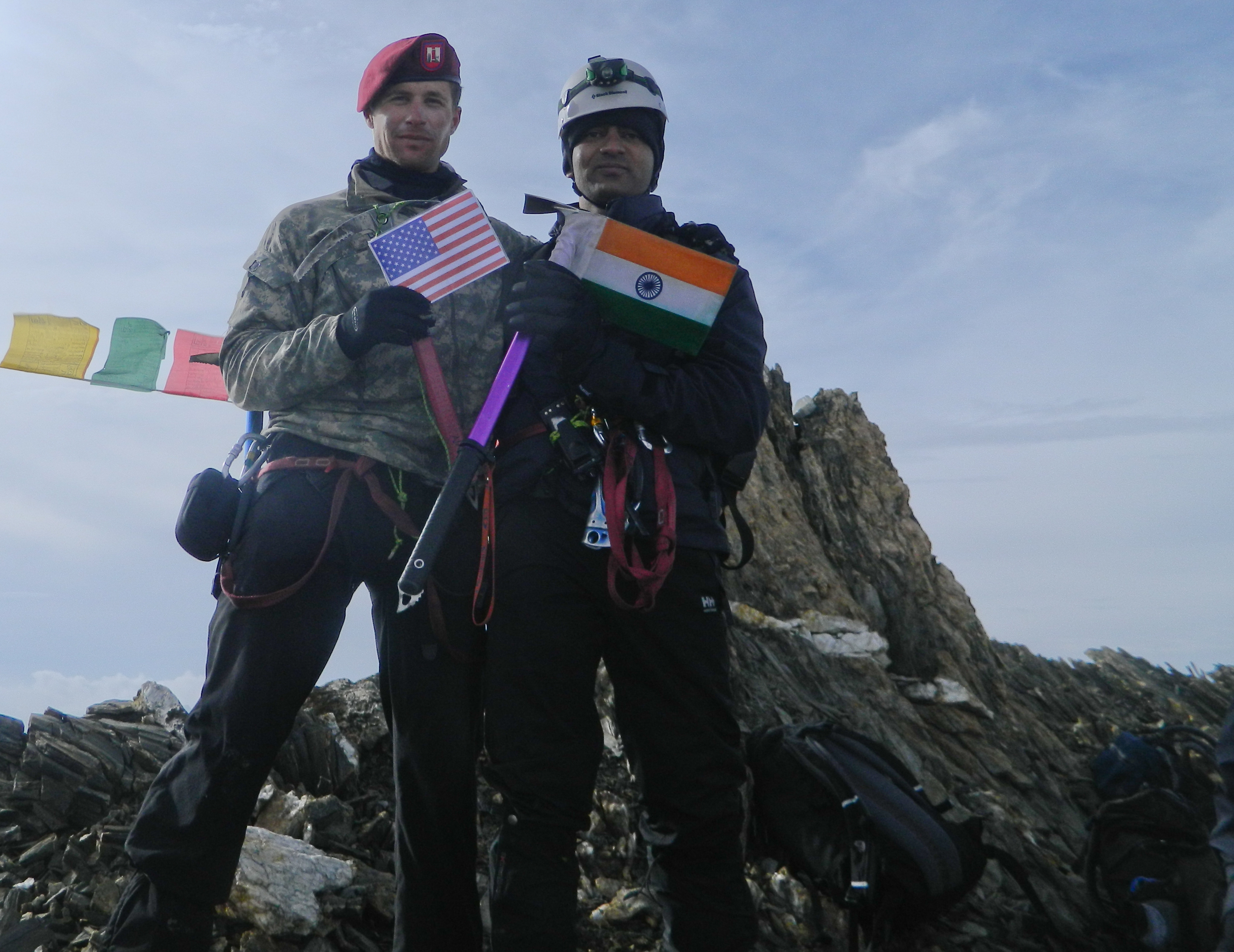
U.S. Army Capt. Mathew Hickey and Indian Army Maj. Sanat Kumar at the summit of Machoi Peak on 7 July 2013.

Machoi Peak was first surveyed by a British medical team headed by Dr Ernest Neve in 1912. It was later climbed by a team of Indian army on 10 September 1984.

The easiest route to climb Mechoi Peak is from the right side of Amarnath cave which leads to its west face, starts from Baltal a 20 kilometers high altitude alpine tract leads to the foothills of the peak. From the north side it is steep and one has to cross the whole Machoi glacier with ridges and falling ice. The east face of the peak is more difficult due to the remoteness of the area which starts from Matayan, Dras.
