= Gangani =

Gangani may refer to:

- Gangani (Ireland), an ancient tribe of Ireland
- Gangani, Jodhpur, a village in India
- Gangani, Baltistan, a village in Pakistan
