= Machoi Glacier =

Glacier in India

- Location within Jammu and Kashmir Location within Ladakh Location within India
- Interactive map of Machoi Glacier
- Type: Mountain Glacier
- Coordinates: 34°13′30″N 75°34′00″E
- Length: 9 kilometres (6 mi)

The Machoi Glacier is a 9 kilometer long glacier in the Himalayan Range in Jammu and Kashmir and Ladakh, India.

== Geography ==
It is situated 30 kilometer west from Drass, Ladakh, India and 8 kilometers east from Sonamarg on the southern side of NH 1D at Zojila. It lies at an average elevation of 4800 meters.

The highest peak named after the glacier is the Machoi Peak that lies at the eastern end of the glacier, at an elevation of 5458 meters. The glacier is the source of the Sind River that flows westwards, and the Dras river that flows eastwards.

Machoi, like many other Himalayan glaciers has been melting at alarming rates due to Global warming.
