= Olding, Pakistan =

Olding: ཨོལ་ཏིང་ཐང།; اولڈینگ
- Union Council
- Interactive map of Olding
- Location in Gilgit-Baltistan, Pakistan Olding (Kashmir) Olding (Pakistan)
- Country: Pakistan
- Adm. Unit: Gilgit-Baltistan
- District: Kharmang District
- Elevation: 2,644 m (8,676 ft)
- Time zone: UTC+5:00 (PKT)

Olding (Urdu: اولڈینگ), originally Olthing Thang (Balti: ཨོལ་ཏིང་ཐང།, romanized: Ol ting thanga), (Note: Alternative spellings: Olthingthang, Oltingthang, and Ulding Thung.) is a village and union counil in the Dras River valley in the Kharmang District of Baltistan, Pakistan. The village is 8,676 feet (2,644 m) above the sea level. It is close to the Line of Control, the de facto India-Pakistan border in the disputed Kashmir region, and lies on the traditional trade route between Baltistan and Ladakh via Kargil.

== Geography ==
Olthingthang is in the valley of the Dras River (also called Shingo River or Suru River), shortly before its confluence with the Indus River near Marol. The Dras valley is quite narrow there, and the village is actually located on the slopes of a spur, about 800 to 1,000 ft above the river. It was described as a big village in 1912, and often listed as a halting place on the route from Kargil to Skardu. It is 13 miles from Gangani, the first village in Baltistan to the north of the Line of Control.

== People ==
The village is predominantly inhabited by Tibetic peoples such as Baltis and Purigpas, Balti and Purgi are the main languages and Urdu serving as lingua franca. The dominant faith practiced by the people is Islam.

== Economy ==
The village is known for many varieties of fruit such as apricot, apple, grapes, mulberry, cherry and peach etc. Peoples of the village sell the fruits and earn thousands of rupees. Varieties of apricots include margholum, halmand, khochuli, sitachuli, khositar and Situnchuli.

== Maps ==
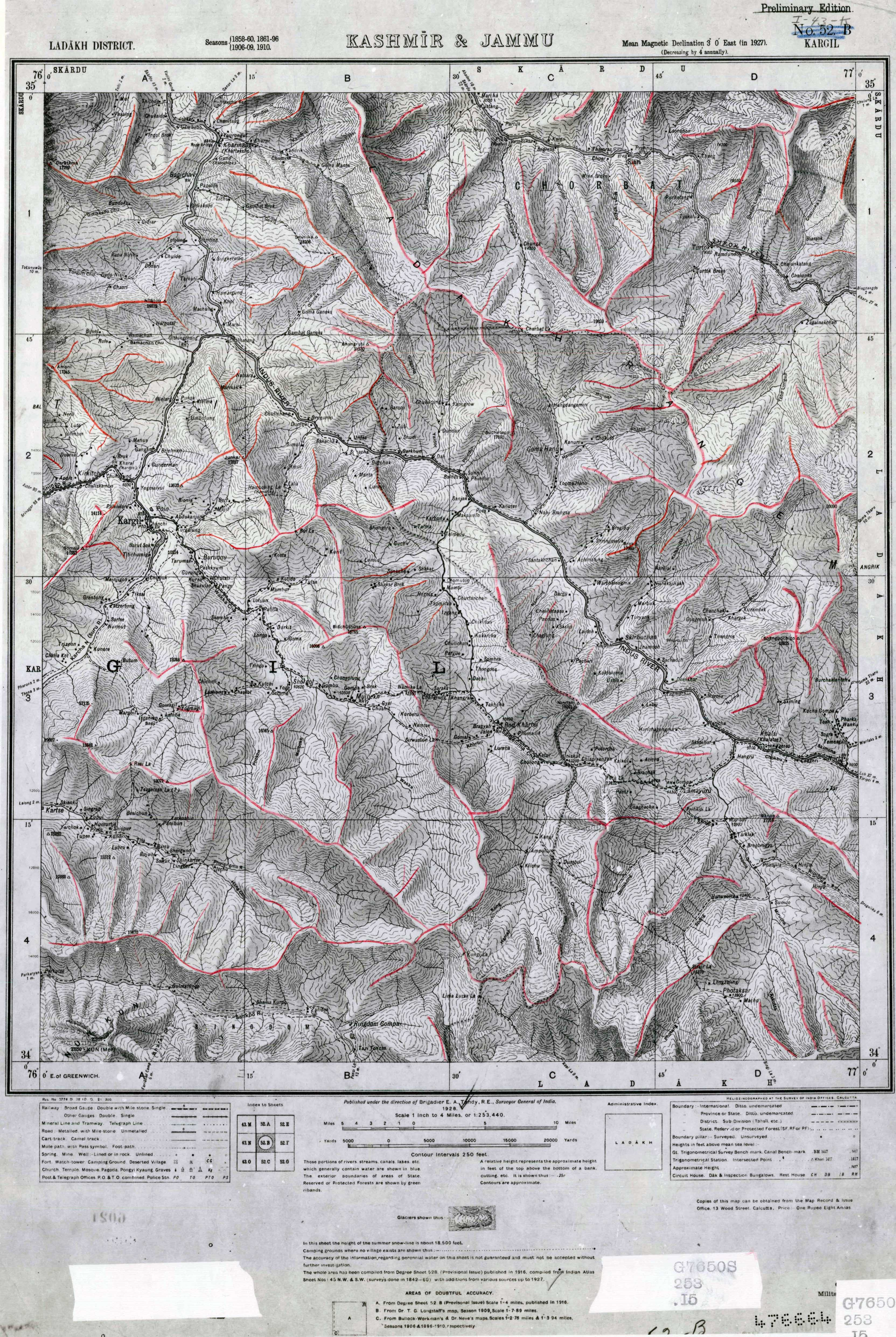
SoI map, 1928

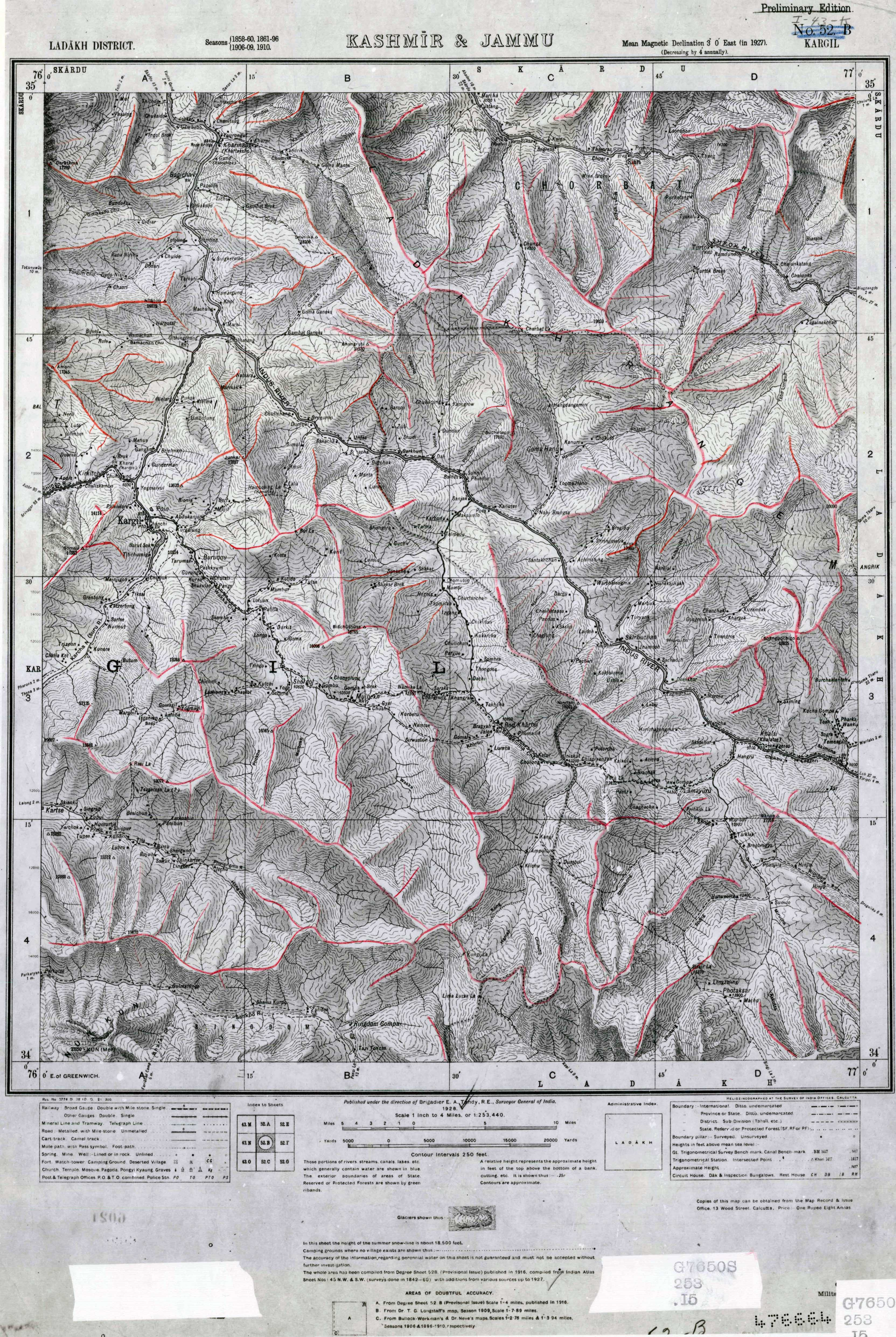
SoI map, 1946, showing the 1948 LoC

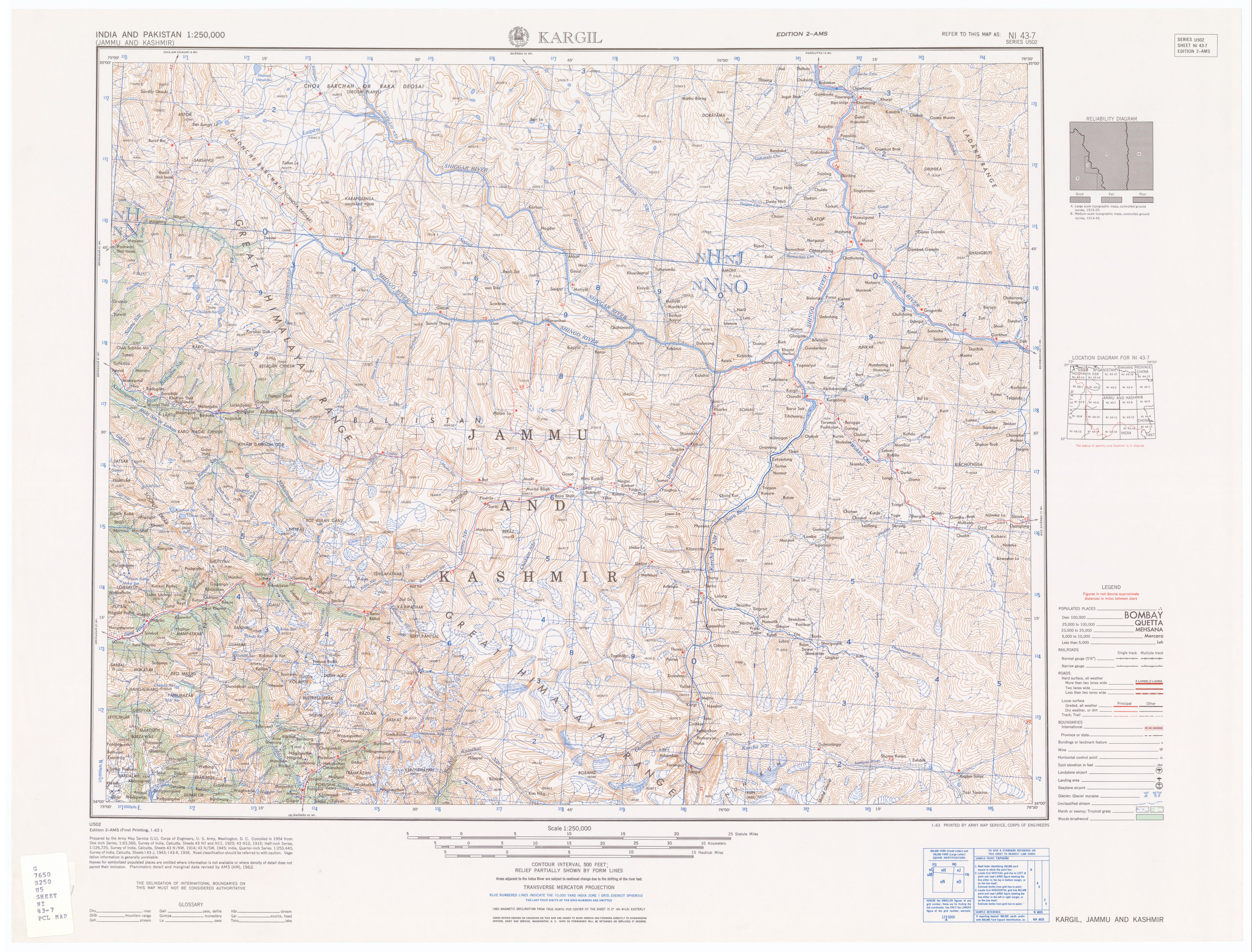
AMS map, 1955

== See also ==
- Skardu
- Kargil
- Kashmir

== Bibliography ==
- Gazetteer of Kashmir and Ladak, Calcutta: Superintendent of Government Printing, 1890 – via archive.org
- Dani, Ahmad Hasan (2001), History of Northern Areas of Pakistan: Upto 2000 A.D., Sang-e-Meel Publications, ISBN 978-969-35-1231-1 – via archive.org
- Filippi, Filippo de (1912), Karakoram and Western Himalaya 1909, New York: E. P. Dutton and Company – via archive.org
