= National Highway 1D (India, old numbering) =

Old numbering of road in India

National Highway 1D
- Map of National Highway 1D in red
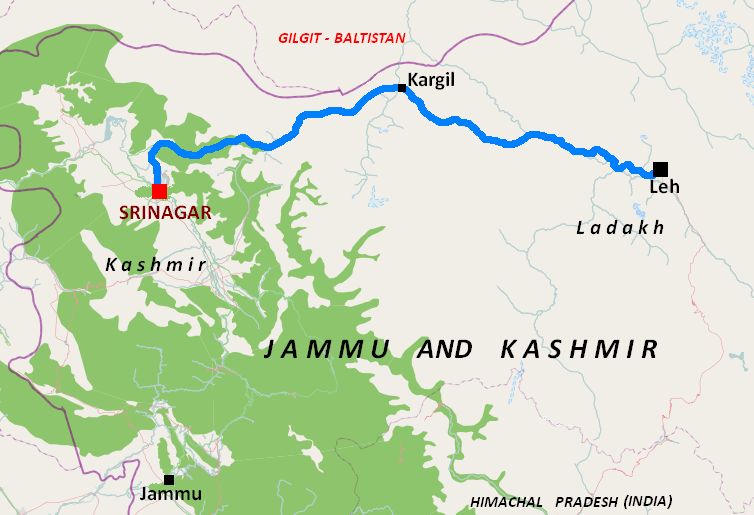

Route information
- Length: 422 km (262 mi)

Major junctions
- West end: Srinagar, Jammu and Kashmir
- NH 1A in Srinagar
- East end: Leh, Ladakh

Location
- Country: India
- States: Jammu and Kashmir: 422 km (262 mi)
- Primary destinations: Srinagar - Zoji La - Kargil - Leh

Highway system
- Roads in India; Expressways; National; State; Asian
← NH 1A	→ NH 21

National Highway 1D (NH 1D), also known as Srinagar–Leh Highway, was a National Highway in the state of Jammu and Kashmir that connected Srinagar to Leh in Ladakh. The Srinagar-Leh Highway was declared as National Highway in 2006. It is now part of National Highway 1 that extends west to Uri.

The old Central Asian trade route Srinagar–Leh–Yarkand was also known as the Treaty Road, after a commercial treaty signed in 1870 between Maharaja Ranbir Singh and Thomas Douglas Forsyth.

== New numbering ==
In 2010, old NH1A (Uri–Srinagar) and old NH1D (Srinagar–Leh) have been combined to make up the newly numbered National Highway 1.

== Geography ==
For most part, NH 1D transited through extremely treacherous terrain and followed the historic trade route along the Indus River, thus giving modern travelers a glimpse of villages which are historically and culturally important. The road generally remained open for traffic from early June to mid-November. The total length of NH 1 was 422 km (262 mi).

The two highest passes on NH 1D include Zoji La at 3,528 m (11,575 ft) on the High Himalayas and Fotu La at 4,108 m (13,478 ft) on the Ladakh Range. Despite its lower elevation, Zoji La is more snow-bound than Fotu La.

Dras, located some 170 km (110 mi) from Srinagar at elevation of 3,249 m (10,659 ft), is the first major village east of the Zoji La pass. The village is inhabited by a population of mixed Kashmiri and Dard origins, having a reputation of being the second coldest permanent inhabited spot in the world after Siberia, with temperatures dropping to −45 °C (−49 °F).

After Dras, the road follows the Dras River valley up to Kargil and then takes Wakha Rong valley till Fotu La. After that, it follows branch valleys of the Indus River valley which meet Indus near Khalatse. The government runs a checkpost at Khalatse.

Heavy snowfall on the highest passes can block traffic, cutting Leh from Srinagar for some six months each year. During springtime, the Border Roads Organisation (BRO) plows snow and repairs damages caused by landslides. Zoji La pass received reportedly some 18 m (59 ft) of snowfall in 2008.

== History ==
In the 17th and 18th centuries, the road was only a track, impassable even with ponies. Goods, mainly pashmina wool, were carried by porters from Yarkand and Tibet for the Kashmir shawl industry.

In the 19th century, under the Dogra rule after Zorawar Singh annexed Ladakh, the route was improved, allowing pony caravans to pass. In 1870, under Maharaja Ranbir Singh of Jammu and Kashmir, a treaty was signed with British Raj, whereby the Jammu and Kashmir state undertook to maintain the road up to the Central Asian border (possibly the Karakoram Pass), allocating annual funds for the purpose. The road came to be known as the "Treaty Road"

During the 1950s, tensions rose in Ladakh region. China secretly built a military road spanning some 1,200 km (750 mi) from Xinjiang to western Tibet, which was discovered by Indian in 1957 and confirmed by Chinese maps showing the road in 1958. The political situation eroded, culminating in 1962 in the Sino-Indian War.

The road on the Chinese side gave PLA an advantage as a reliable supply line, giving the Indian Army impetus to build a road for supply and mobilisation of their own troops. The building started from Sringar in 1962, reaching Kargil in two years. This was the basis of modern Srinagar-Leh Highway. Building the road was hazardous task, given the challenging geographical location, and maintaining the road is still an unenviable task.

Restrictions on civilian traffic were lifted in 1974.

This highway was used as mobilisation route by the Indian Army during Pakistani occupation of Kargil in 1999, known as Operation Vijay.

== Gallery ==
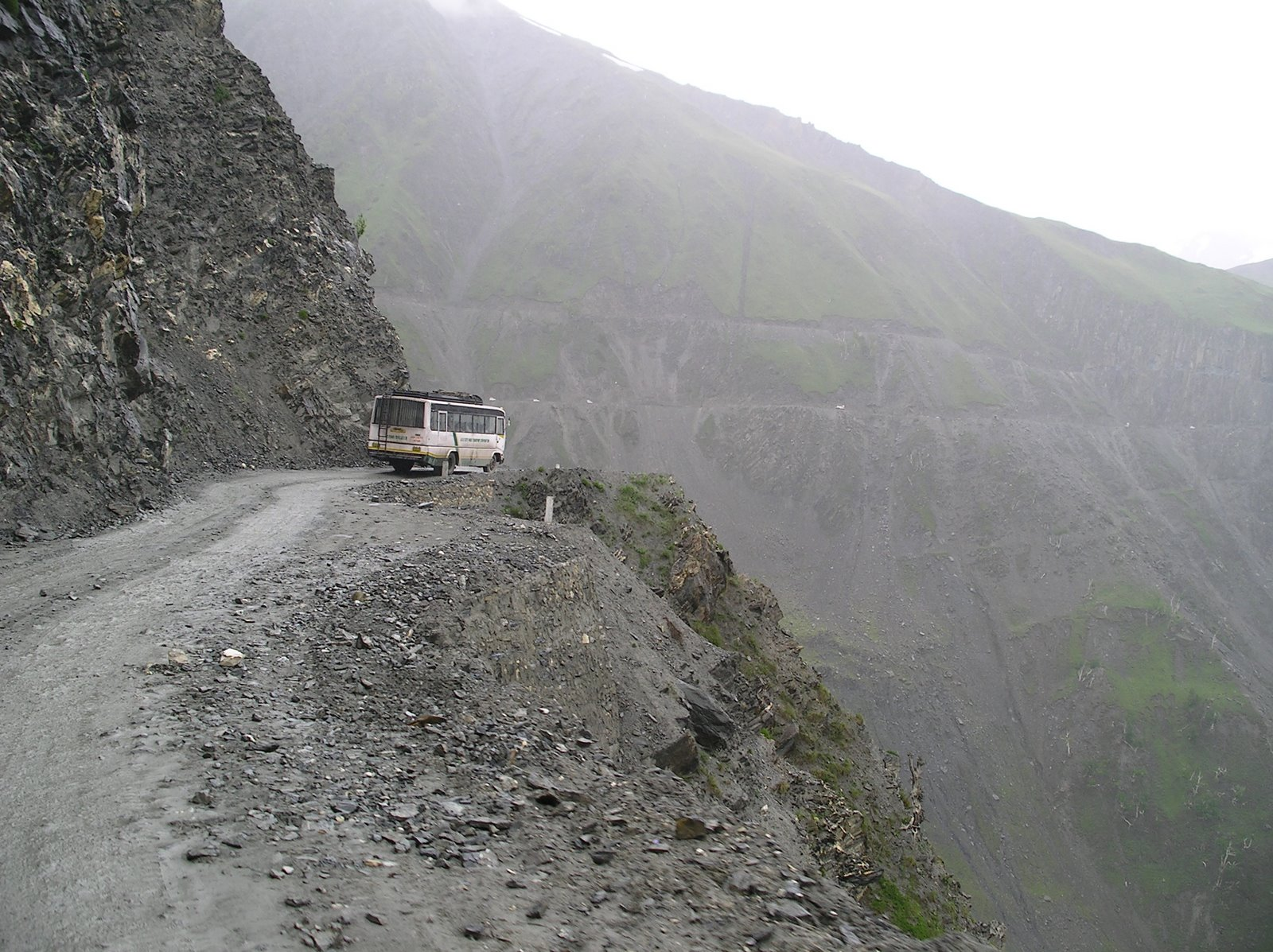

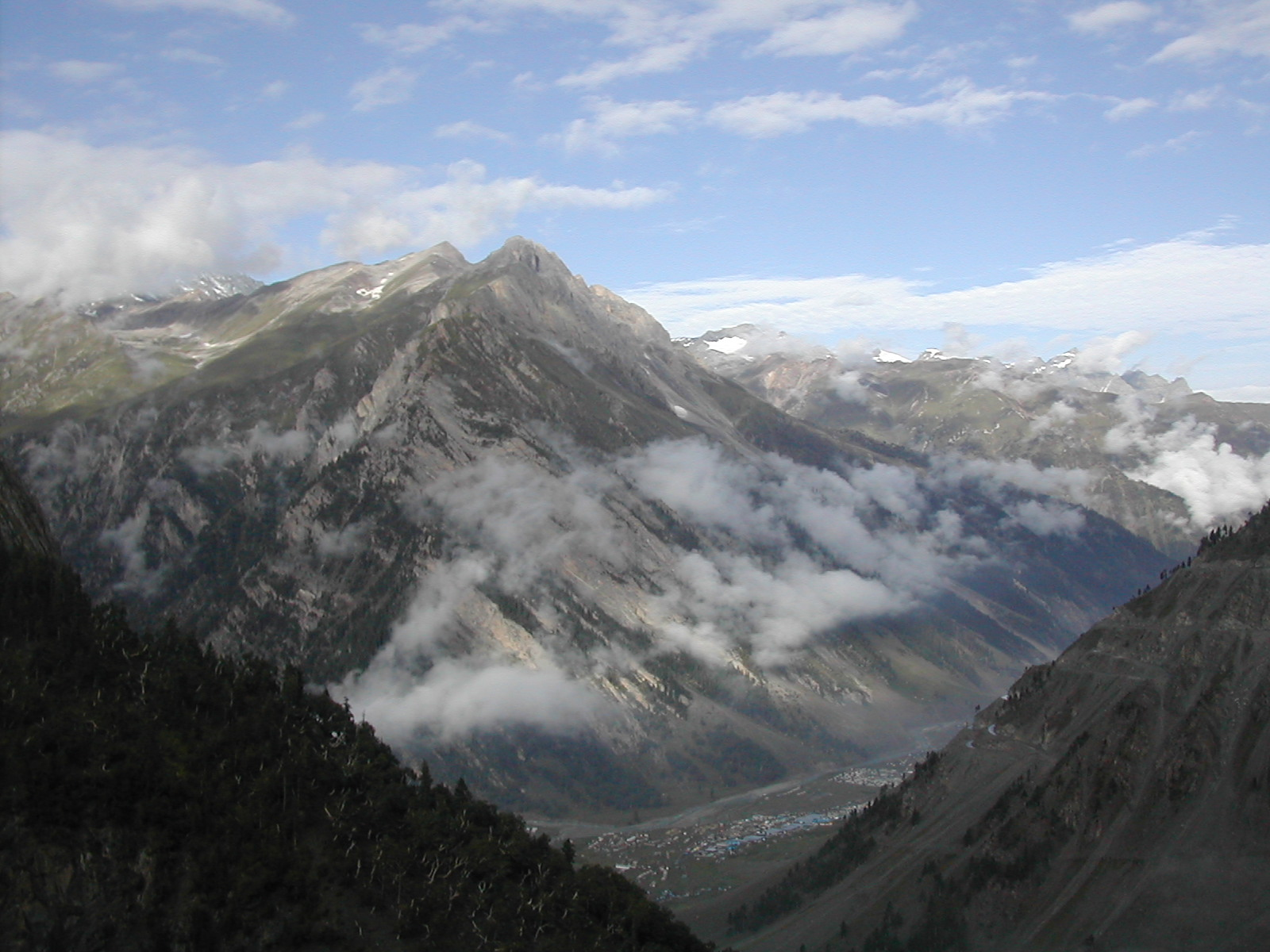

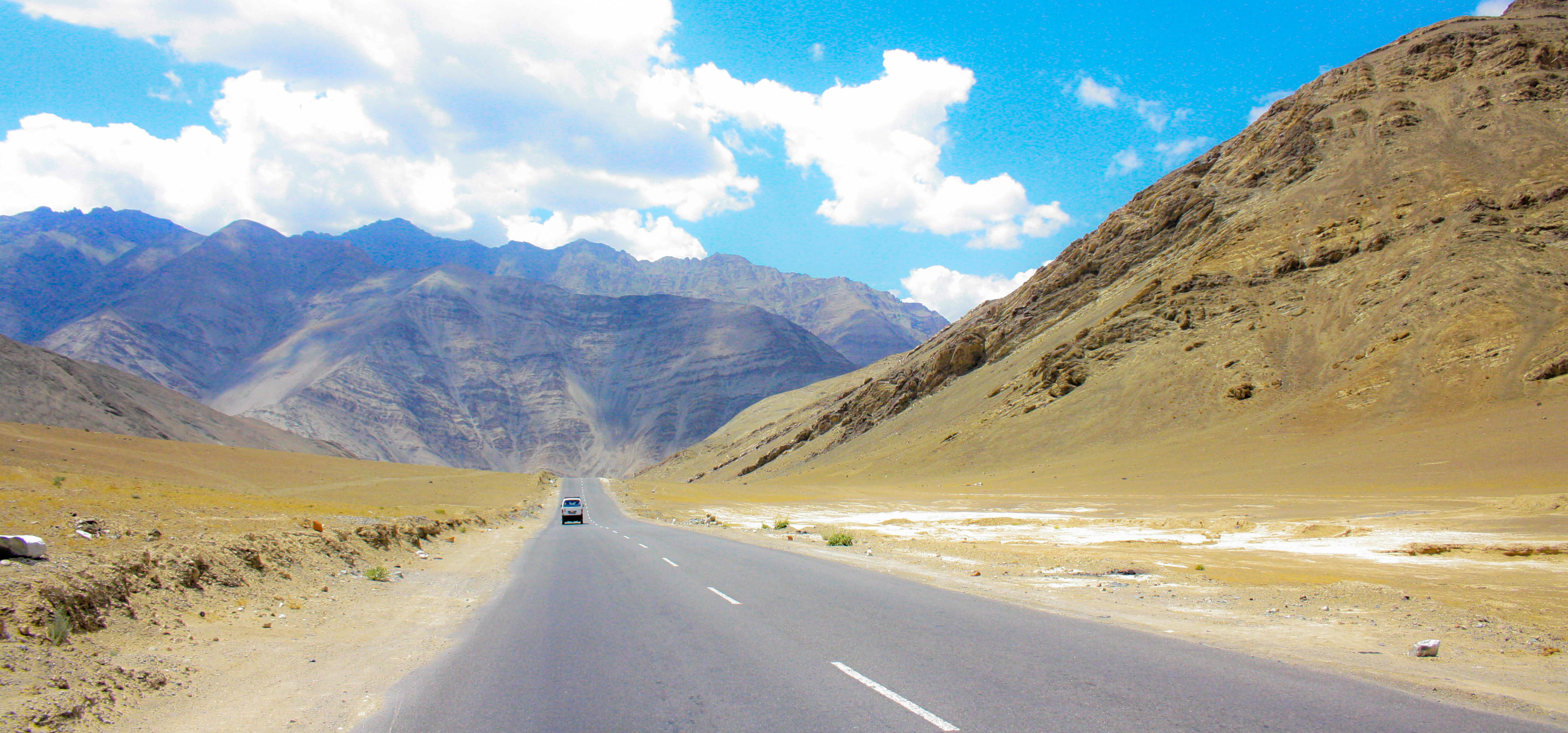
Magnetic Hill

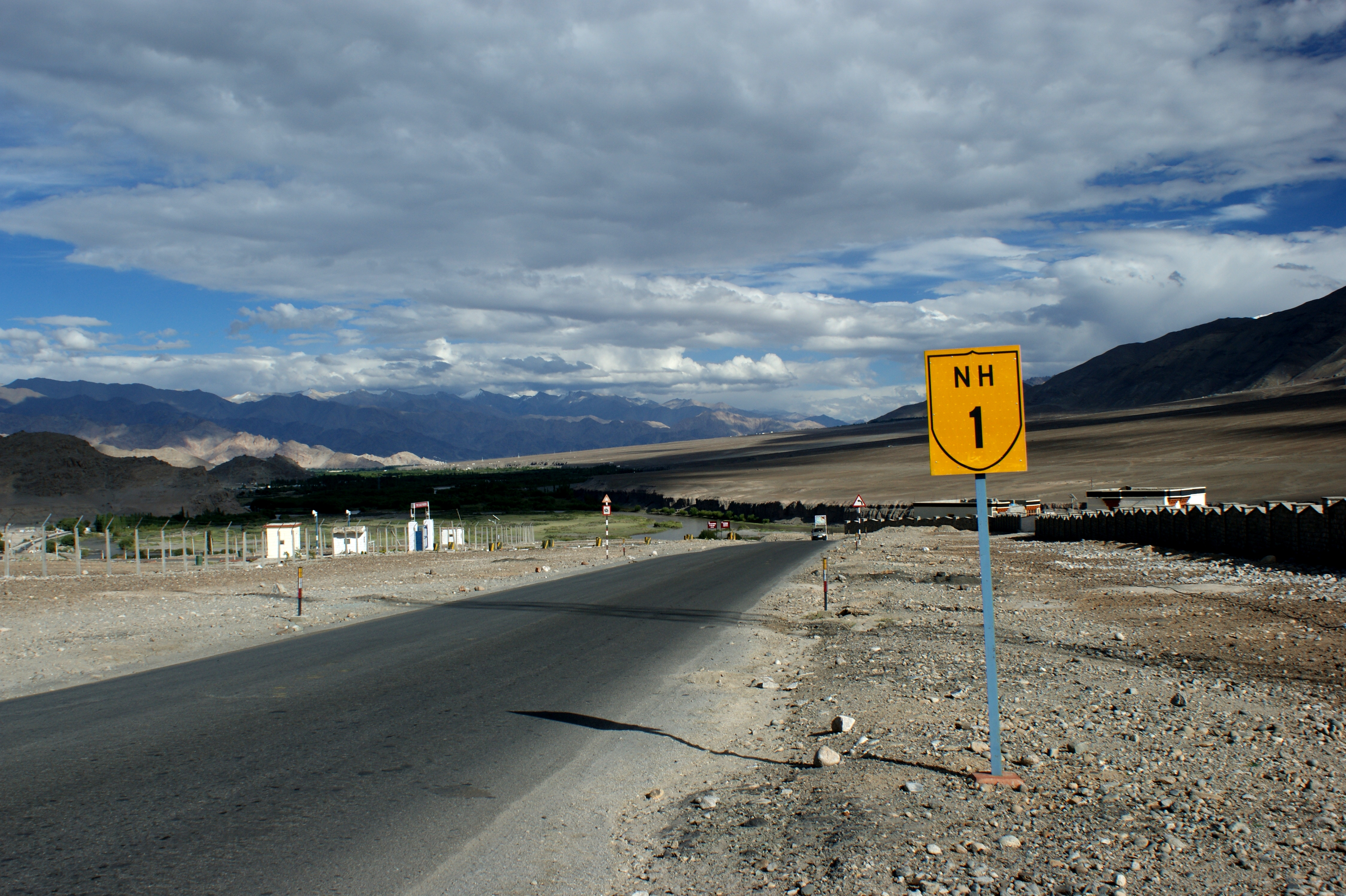

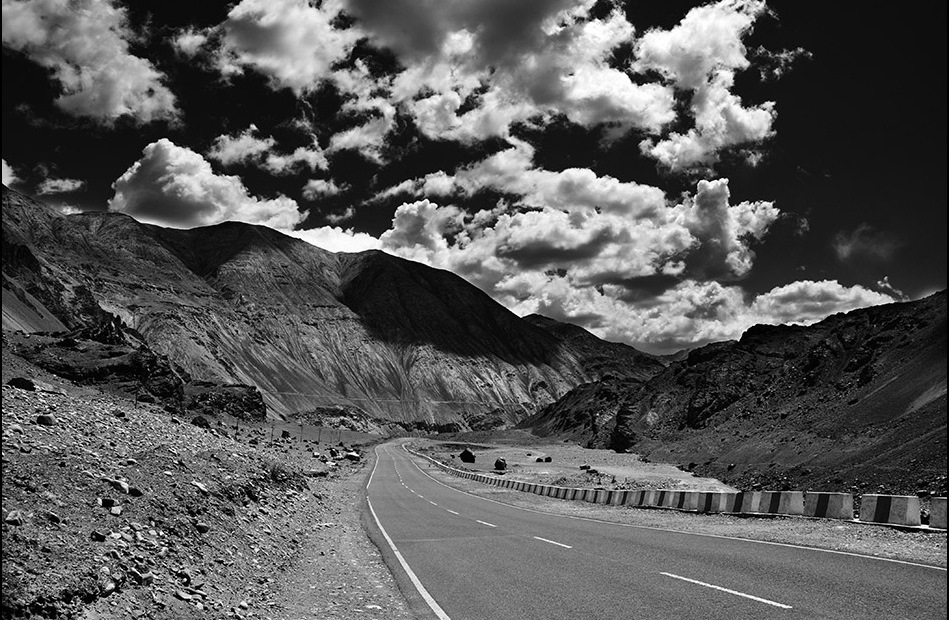

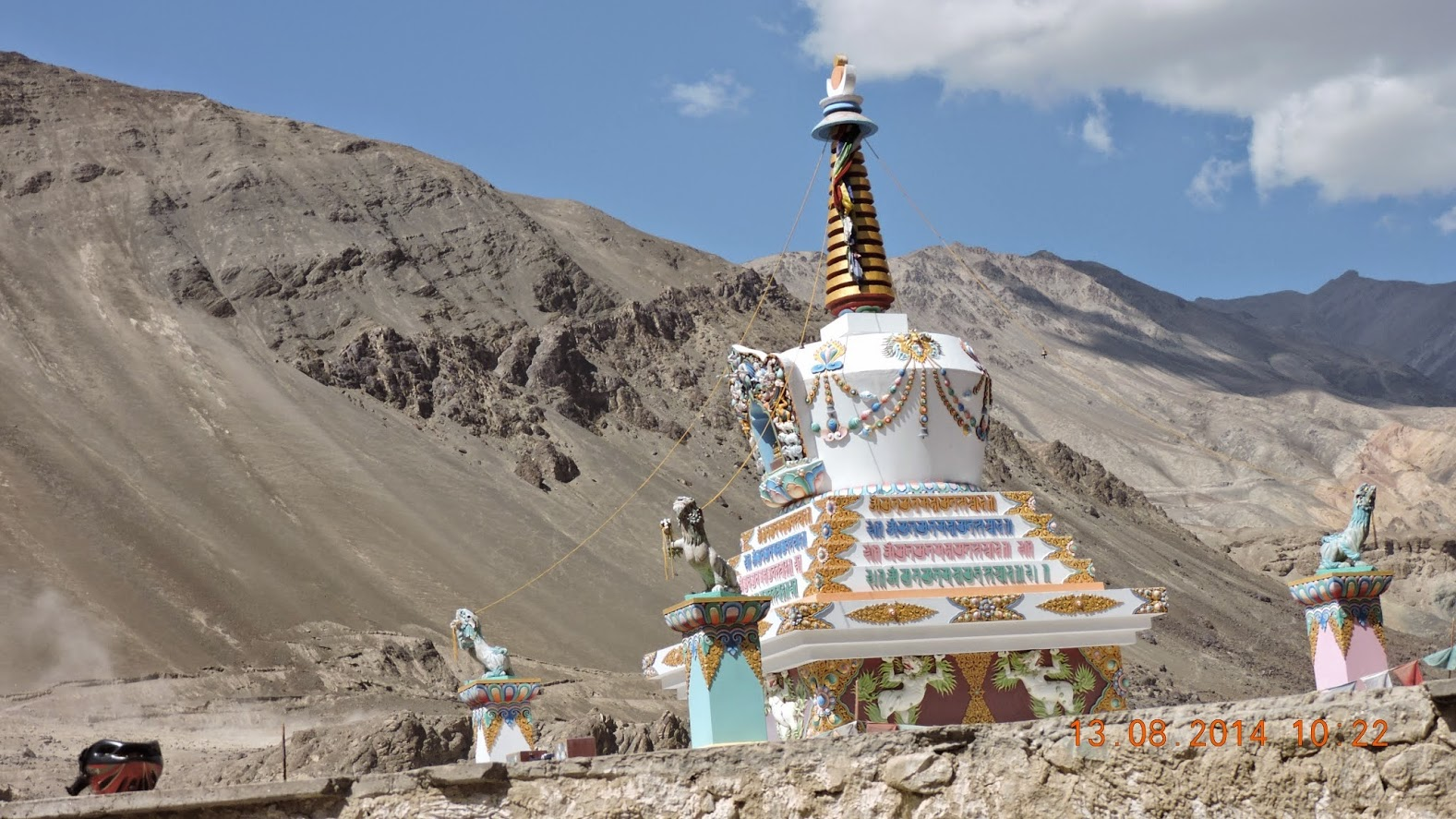
Khaltse Memorial Stupa

== See also ==
- List of national highways in India
- National Highways Development Project
- Origins of the Sino-Indian border dispute
- Sino-Indian War
