= Shingo River =

River in Pakistan and India

Shingo Riveria
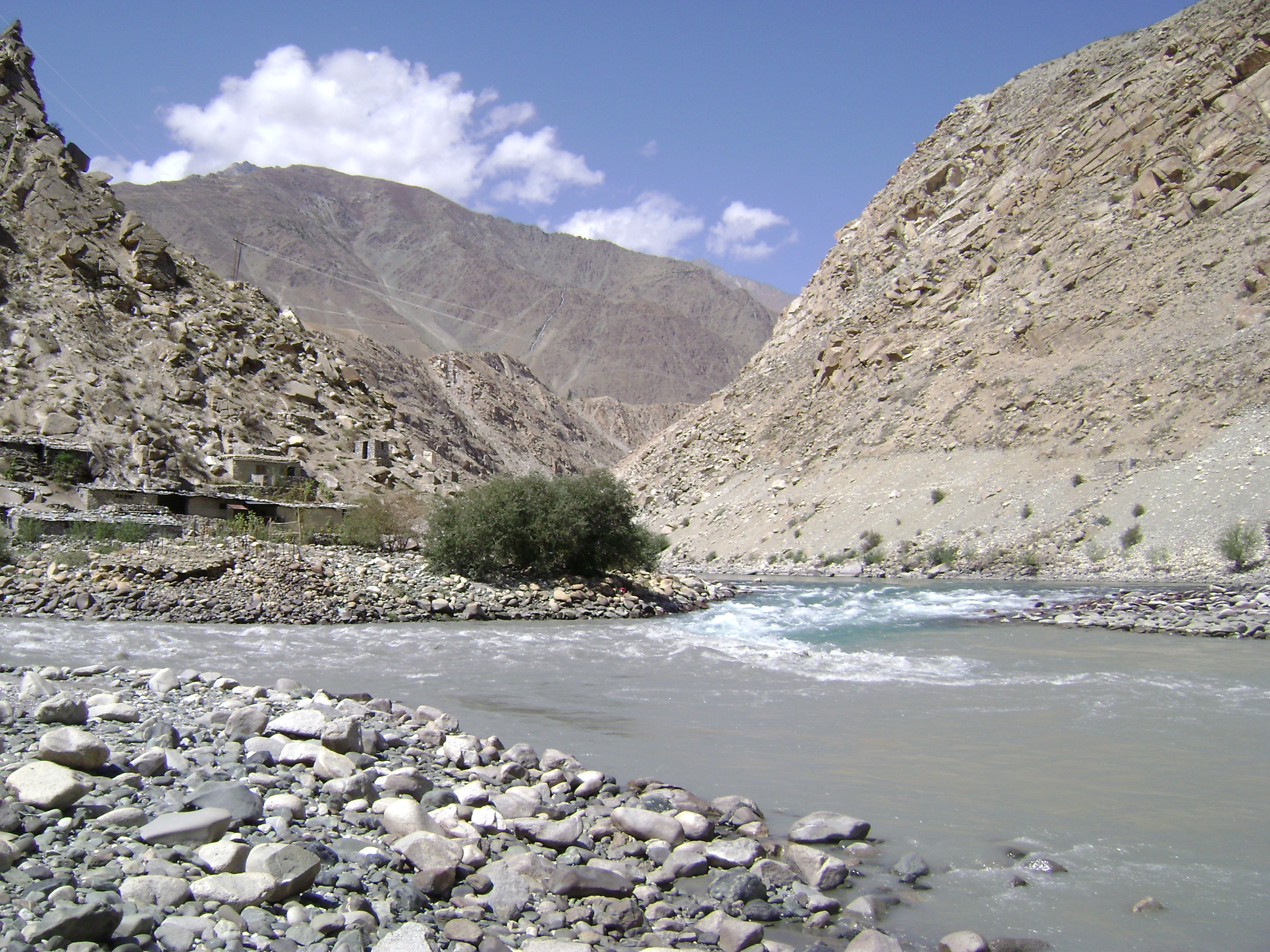
- Shingo river (blue) meeting the Dras river in Dalunang

- Location within Kashmir

Location
- Countries: Pakistan, India
- Provinces: Gilgit-Baltistan, Ladakh

Physical characteristics
- Source: Chota Deosai Plains
  - location: Astore District, Gilgit-Baltistan, Pakistan
  - coordinates: 34.8913°N 75.1129°E
- Mouth: Indus River
  - location: Marol
  - coordinates: 34.7459°N 76.2165°E

Basin features
- Progression: Indus→ Arabian Sea
- Tributaries
  - left: Shiggar River
  - right: Dras River, Suru River

The Shingo River is a tributary of the Indus River, and flows through Gilgit-Baltistan in Pakistan and Kargil in India. The river originates in Gilgit-Batistan region and flows into the Kargil district where it joins the Dras River. The combined river receives the waters of the Suru River and flows into Baltistan again, joining the Indus River near Marol.

== Course ==
The river originates in Pakistan's Chhota Deosai plains in the Astore District north of Minimarg, then flows east. The Shigar or Shiggar River, (Note: This is not to be confused with the Shigar River that rises near the Baltoro Glacier and joins the Indus near Skardu.) which originates in the Bara Deosai Plateau to the north, also flows east and joins the Shingo River before it enters the Indian-administered Kargil district near Dalunang. In the Kargil district, at the Kaksar village, the Shingo is joined by the Dras River, which originates near Zojila Pass and flows northeast. The flow of Shingo is then doubled. The combined river, which is either called Dras or Shingo, flows east till the hamlet of Kharul, 7 km north of Kargil, where it makes a 90-degree bend to flow north-northeast.

Also at Kharul, the Suru River joins the Dras/Shingo river and the latter in effect flows through the channel of the Suru River as it turns north. The combined river flows through the Kharmang District of Baltistan, passing by the substantial village of Olding on the left, before joining the Indus River a little above Marol.

The Shingo river is clearer than other rivers in Ladakh because it is formed from melting ice. It flows through Chanigund.

== Environment ==
The Shingo River runs north of the Line of Control dividing the Indian- and Pakistani-administered portions of Kashmir. Gultari is the largest city on its course. A road runs parallel to the river, which once connected Kargil to Astore District. Once in the Kargil, the valley of the Shingo–Drass river contains India's National Highway 1 connecting the Kashmir and Ladakh. After reentering Baltistan, its valley supports the Shingo River Road, which is also called the Kargil–Skardu Road.
