= Gangani, Baltistan =

Gangani گنگنی
- Village
- Interactive map of Gangani
- Location within Gilgit Baltistan Location within Pakistan
- Coordinates: 34.63961°N 76.13596°E
- Country: Pakistan
- State: Gilgit-Baltistan
- District: Kharmang
- Tehsil: Kharmang
- Union council: Bresil
- Time zone: UTC+5:00 (PST)

Gangani (Note: Alternative spellings: Gangam, Gungum and Kankani) (Urdu: گنگنی, romanized: ganganī) is remote, border village in the Kargil sector of Gilgit-Baltistan in northern Pakistan. It is considered the last village in the Kharmang District, with the LOC succeeding it. It lies upon the Shingo River, a tributary of the Indus River, in the lower Kharmang Valley. The settlement’s position places it along the historical route that once linked Srinagar and Skardu.

== History ==
The local tongue of the population is Balti, as spoken in the entire Kharmang Valley. Towards the end of the 19th century, the settlement was known to have been populated by four houses.

=== Kargil War ===
The Gangani village was severely devastated by firing, leaving the village almost destroyed. 80 percent of the population was displaced following incidents of Indian firing along the Line of Control (LoC) in the Kargil War, and around 30 families had been displaced to other regions of Baltistan.

== Geography ==
The terrain located near Gangani are vast sand mounds, which have said to have been exploited as large gold mines in ancient times.

== Education and Health ==
The Boys Primary School is the sole educational institute in Gangani.

The village also has a local civil dispensary, where the nearest hospital is located in Tolti.

== See also ==
- Olding, Pakistan
