= Gultari Valley =

Gultari Valley گلتری
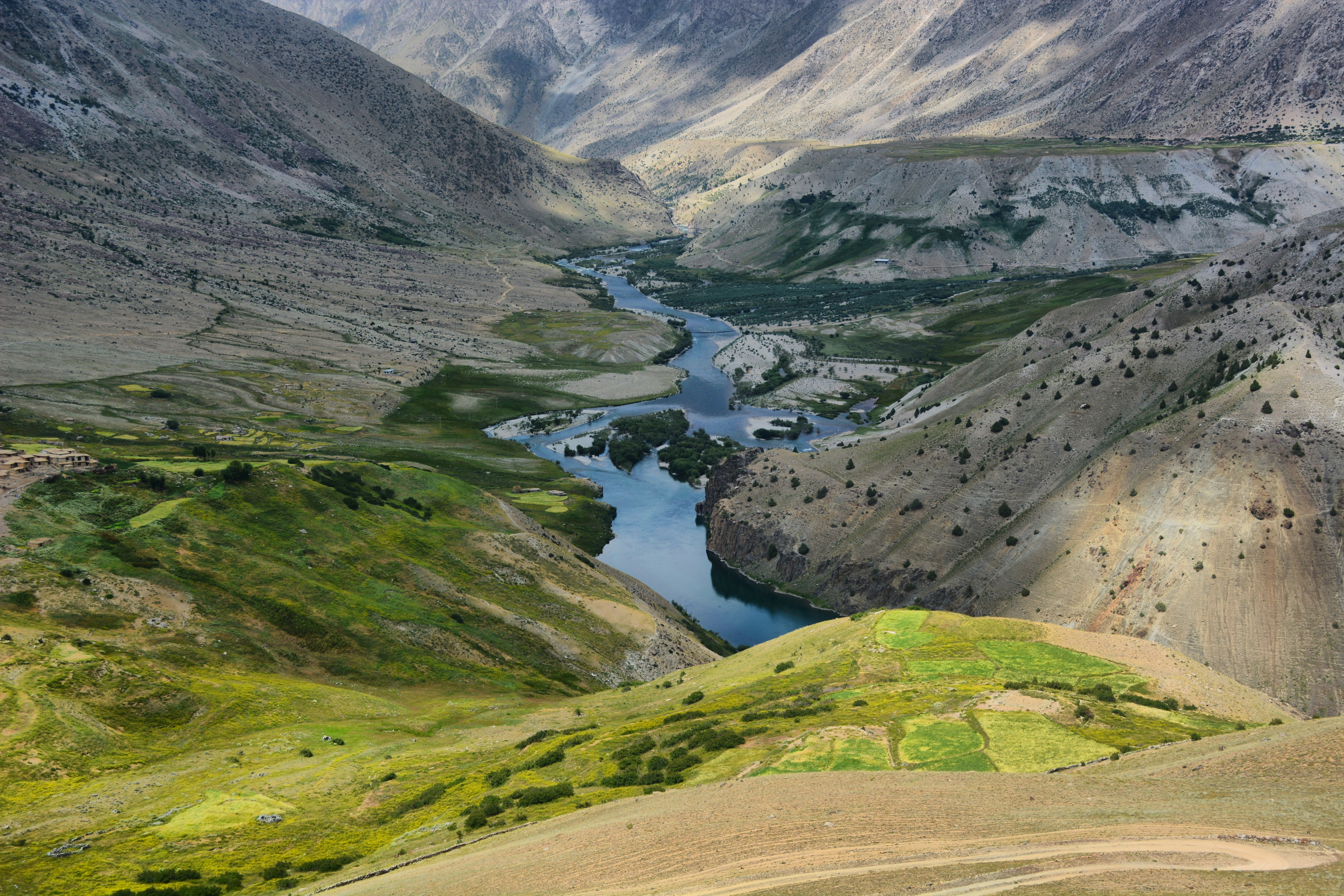

- Location in Gilgit–Baltistan
- Coordinates: 35°6′23″N 75°3′30″E
- Country: Pakistan
- Territory: Gilgit–Baltistan
- Time zone: UTC+5 (PST)
  - Summer (DST): UTC+6 (GMT+5)

Gultari Valley (Shina:گلتری) (also known as Shingo Shigar), located west of Kargil town with Skardu 288 km to its north and Dras in south, is amongst the biggest valleys of Gilgit-Baltistan on the disputed India Pakistan Line of Control (LoC) in Himalaya. It comprises three sub-valleys, Shingo, Saigar and Phultukus, with the majority people speaking the Shina language. Gultari is a district subdivision in Skardu District of Pakistan administered Gilgit-Baltistan with 10,000 population spread across 16 revenue estate villages, some of which have several isolated hamlets.

This area is a subset of Shingo River, and its main tributary Shigar River also fall in this area, both of these and their tributaries form two main valleys and several subvalleys. Shingo River originates from the watershed immediate west of Burzil La on western fringe of Deosai National Park (DNP) in Pakistan administered area near the LOC. Shingo River flows west to east on Southern fringe of DNP through Gultari, Mousa Village (Haideri Bridge), Faranshat, Buniyol, Kunar, Palawar, Thanus, Babachand (turns south and enters Indian administered side of LOC) and confluences with the Dras river near Latoo in Indian administered area. Road along this route of Shingo River is called the "Astor-Kargil Road". Shigar River, the main tributary of Shingo River, originates north of Shingo River & South of Skardu near Burjila in the northern part of DNP and flows entirely to north of Shingo River. Shigar River flows Northwest to South East via Ginial (collects its tributary Karapchu River) and Shigar, and then confluences with Shingo River near Franshat.

Area falls into the valley of The area has been divided into two union councils (elected village councils or panchayats) for administrative purpose, i.e. Shingo Shighar and Gultari. The Shingo Shighar union council comprises six small villages in the valley of Shigar River: Pato thali, Nogham, Akberabad, Ginyal (Ginial), Matyal, and Thali. The Gultari union council includes 10 villages along the main Shingo River on "Astor-Kargil Road": such as Gultari khas, Sumuluk, Shawaran, Chamaluk, Franshat, Bunyal, Zaigham, Koner, Chundo, Thanote, Shakhma, Babachan, Fultuks (Matial, Haramel, Domial, Machikial, Uchi, Das, Barbat, Baikhial are small hamlets of Fultuks).

Ali Sher Khan Anchan (1590–1625), a Balti king of Maqpon dynasty who unified Baltistan, merged Gultari with Skardu in Baltistan.

== See also ==
- Geography of Ladakh
