= Dras River =

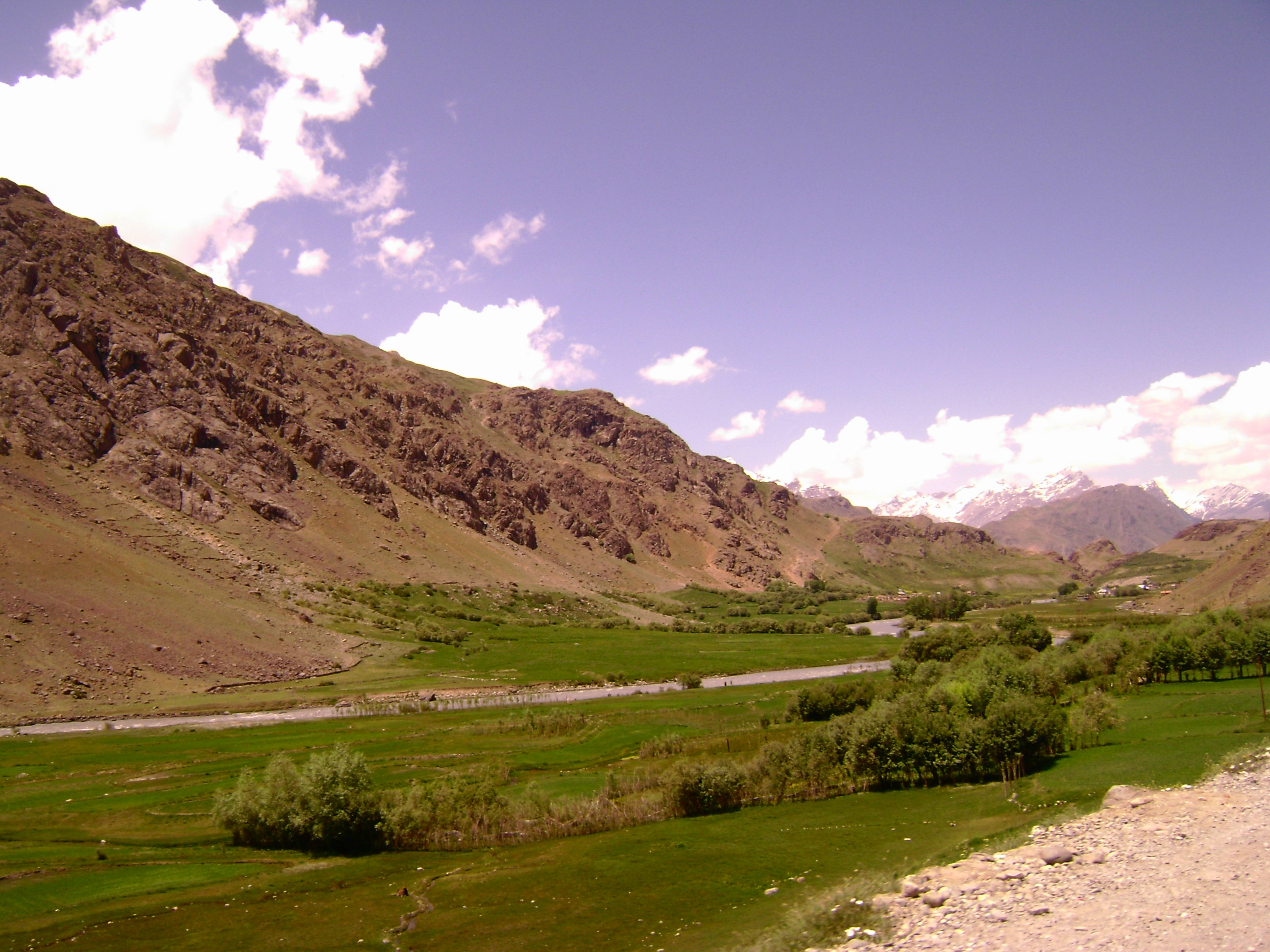
- Dras River

- The confluence of the Dras River with the Suru River

Location
- Country: India
- Union Territory: Ladakh
- District: Kargil

Physical characteristics
- Source: 34.272303°N 75.529832°E
  - location: Machoi Glacier near Zojila
  - elevation: 4,400 m (14,400 ft)
- Mouth: 34.5946°N 76.1202°E
  - location: Suru River at Kharul Kargil
  - elevation: 3,618 m (11,870 ft)
- Length: 86 km (53 mi)
- Discharge
  - average: 212 m^{3}/s (7,500 cu ft/s)

Basin features
- Progression: Indus→ Arabian Sea

The Dras River, also spelt Drass River, is a river in the Kargil district in the Indian union territory of Ladakh. It originates below the Zoji La pass in the Great Himalayan range and flows northeast towards Kargil, where it joins the Suru River. The Shingo River, which flows in a parallel direction in Pakistan-administered Baltistan, also joins the Dras River. The combined river is alternatively called Suru, Drass and Shingo by various local groups.

The Dras River valley is traversed by the National Highway 1D that connects Srinagar in Kashmir with Leh in Ladakh. It represents a historic trade route.

== Course ==
The Dras River is 86 km (53 mi) long and flows entirely in the Dras Valley. Its source lies in the Machoi Glacier near Zojila Pass, the gateway to Ladakh, 26 km (16 mi) east of Sonamarg and 120 km (75 mi) east of Srinagar, the summer capital (May - October) of Jammu and Kashmir. The Machoi Glacier is also the source of the Sind River, which flows through the neighbouring Kashmir Valley in the opposite direction to the Dras River. The Dras River flows northeast, fed by many glacial streams. NH 1D, a national highway connecting Srinagar with Ladakh (Kargil and Leh), runs parallel to the river. The river forms the Dras Valley at Dras, where it is joined by two tributaries, the Mashko Nala and Gamru Nala, which originate in the glaciers of Mashko Valley. In the Dras Valley, the road connecting Dras and Gurais runs parallel to the river.

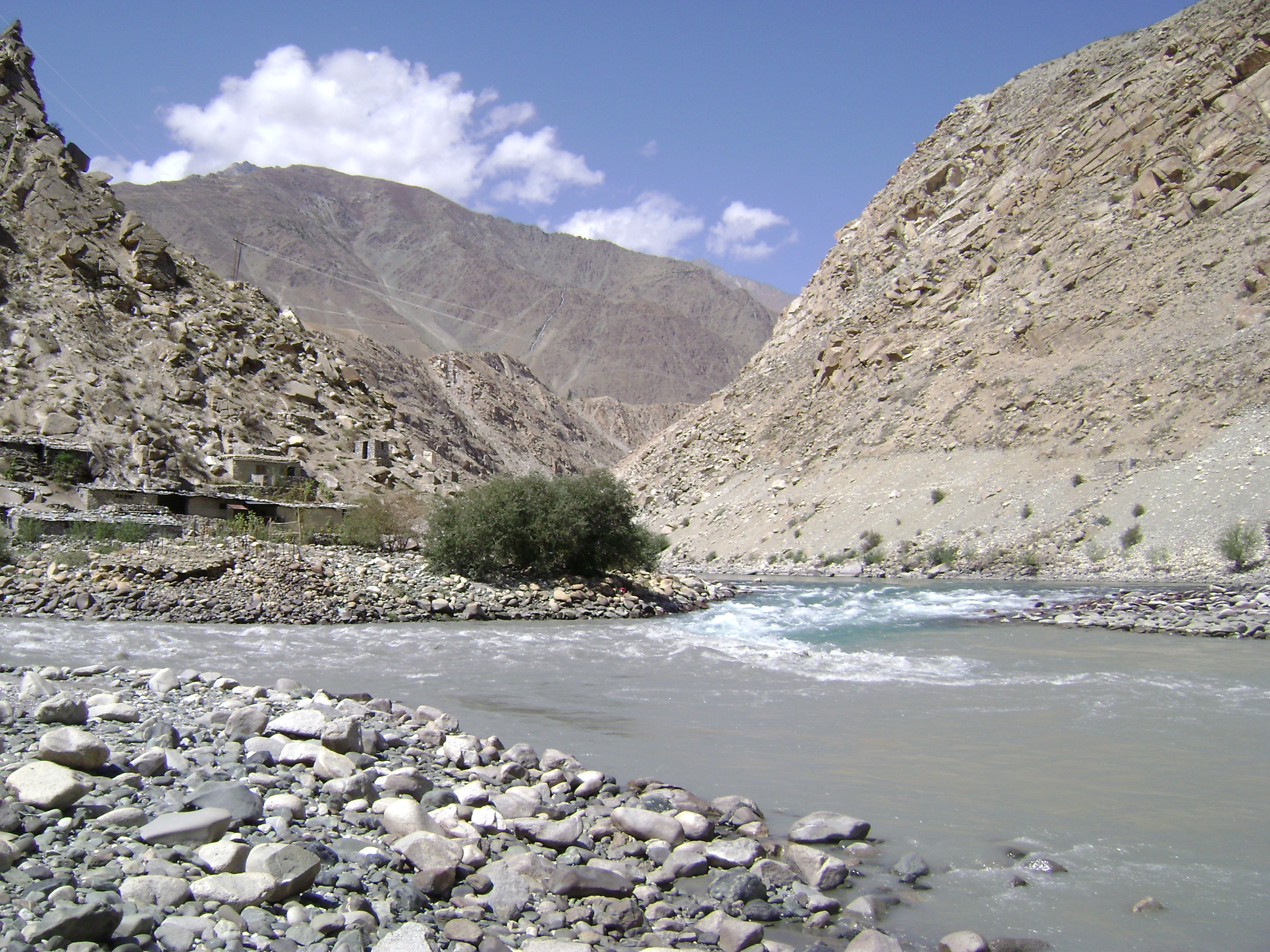
The confluence of the Dras (left) and Shingo rivers

The Shingo River joins the Dras River at Latoo near Kaksar, and doubles the flow of the river. The Shingo River originates in the Chota Deosai Plains north of Minimarg (Astore District, Gilgit-Baltistan) and flows east.

The combined Dras and Shingo rivers join the Suru River at Kharul, 7 km (4.3 mi) north of the town of Kargil. The Suru River is a left tributary of the Indus River. It originates from the Panzella glacier near Pensi La, flows northwards and merges with the Indus River at Nurla in Pakistan-administered Gilgit-Baltistan, 5 km (3.1 mi) north of its confluence with the Dras River. It enters the Pakistani-Administered Kashmir at Post 43 of India or Post 44 of Pakistan.

== Habitation ==
The Dras River flows through the towns of Matayan, Pandrass, Troungjen, Dras, Bhimbat, Thasgam, Shimsha, Kharbu and Kakshar. The largest settlement on its banks is Dras, which is the second-coldest inhabited place in the world after Siberia. The water flow of the river increases during the late summer, due to the heavy melting of glaciers.
