= Gangani, Jodhpur =

Gangani
- Village
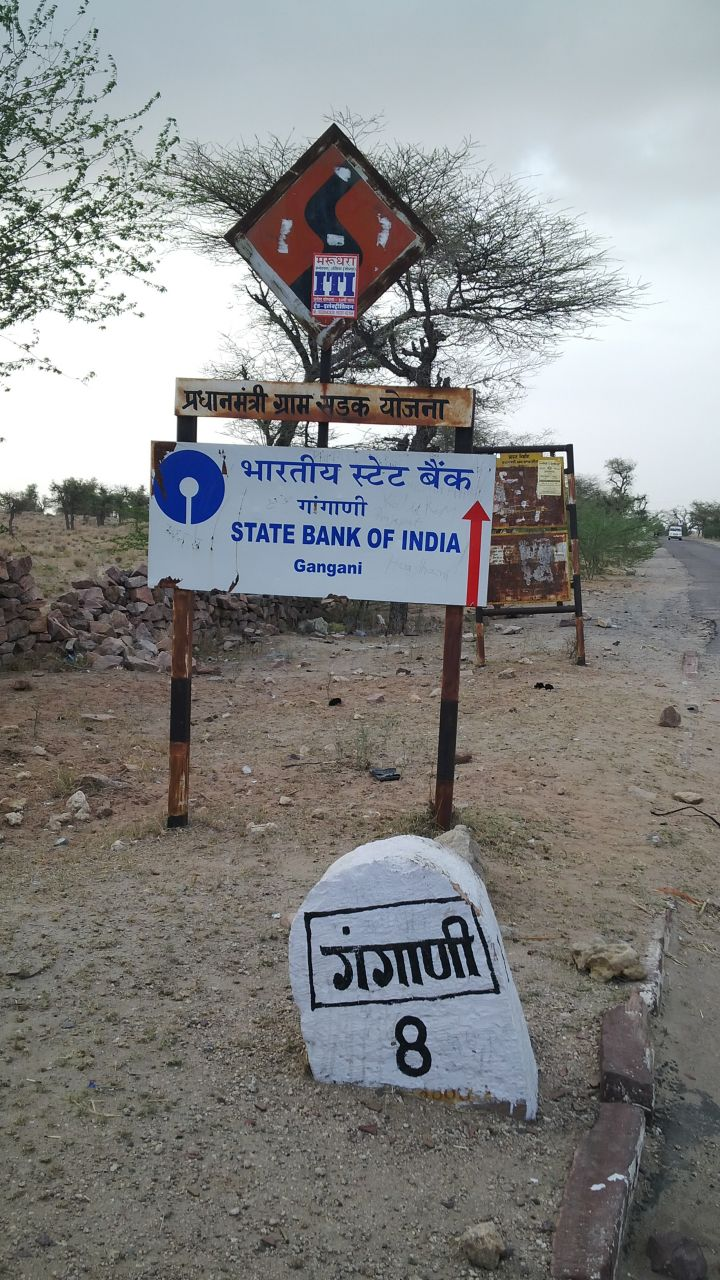

- Location within Rajasthan Location within India
- Coordinates: 26°30′3″N 73°12′42″E
- Country: India
- State: Rajasthan
- District: Jodhpur

Government
  - Type: Panchayati Raj
  - Body: Gram panchayat
  - Sarpanch: bhanwar lal bhadu

Population (2011)
  - Total: 6,467
  - Male: 3,344
  - Female: 3,123

Languages
  - Official: Marwari, Rajasthani
  - Other: Hindi
- Time zone: UTC+5:30 (IST)
- ISO 3166 code: RJ-IN
- Vehicle registration: RJ19
- Lok Sabha constituency: Pali
- Nearest Railway Station: Jodhpur Railway Station

Gangani is a village situated in Baori Tehsil, Jodhpur (Rajasthan). Its geographical location coordinates are 26° 30' 3" North, 73° 12' 42" East .

The formal name of village was Arjunpuri, but changed after its drought river, Ganga which occasionally flow during the periods of monsoons. The main language for communication is Marwadi. The place is also famous for its Jain Temple (Jain-mandir) which is cultural heritage for Jain peoples as it have a gathering spot for Jain disciples once a year. The village also holds a Royal court and chatris build around 600 years before. In 2011 a popular Vishwakarma temple was also built in the village located at Sutharo-ka-bas . MAHADEV Mandir at JATO ka bas

The population of village is 6467, Majority of which are Jats and mali [gehlot]. In Gangani village population of children with age 0-6 is 1186 which makes up 18.34% of total population of village. Average Sex Ratio of Gangani village is 934 which is higher than Rajasthan state average of 928. Child Sex Ratio for the Gangani as per census is 842, lower than Rajasthan average of 888.

In 2011, literacy rate of Gangani village was 51.75% compared to 66.11% of Rajasthan. In Gangani Male literacy stands at 70.22% while female literacy rate was 32.43%.
