= National Highway 1 (India) =

National highway in India

National Highway 1

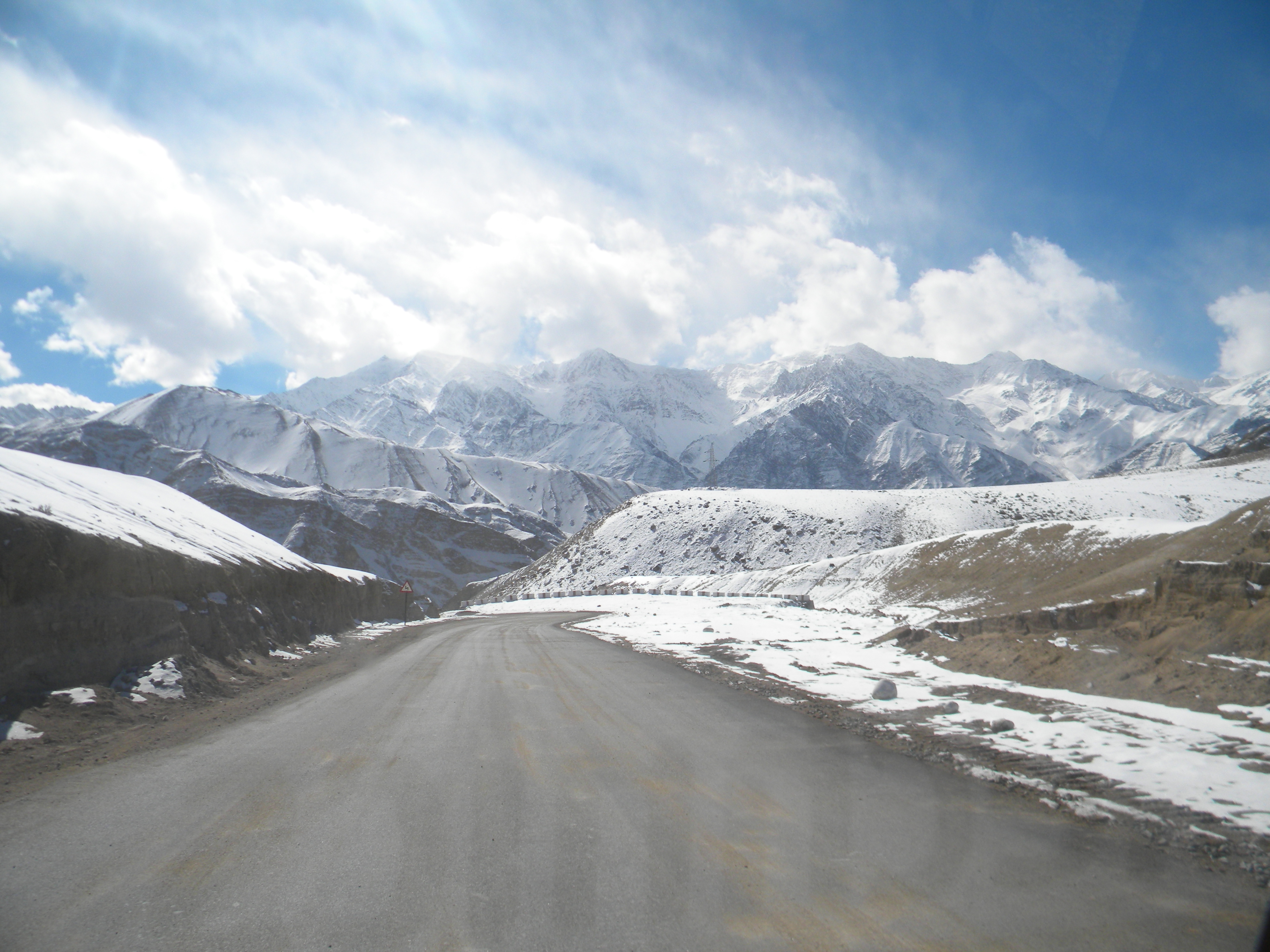
- NH 1 through the Himalayan mountains

Route information
- Maintained by BRO
- Length: 534 km (332 mi)

Major junctions
- East end: NH 3, Leh
- NH 44, Srinagar
- West end: S-3 Strategic Highway, Hattian Bala

Location
- Country: India
- States: Jammu & Kashmir, Ladakh
- Primary destinations: Baramulla, Srinagar, Kargil

Highway system
- Roads in India; Expressways; National; State; Asian
← NH 87	→ NH 301

Schematic map of National Highways in India

National Highway 1 (NH 1) in India runs between the union territories of Jammu & Kashmir and Ladakh. It comprises parts of old NH1A and NH1D. The number 1 indicates, under the new numbering system, that it is the northernmost East–west highway in India.

== History ==
A track between Srinagar in the Kashmir Valley and Leh in Ladakh had existed since medieval times, and it was a prime trade route for many centuries. It passed through the Zoji La pass—3,528 metres (11,575 ft)—over the Great Himalayan range, which is snowbound for half the year.

After the Independence of India, the Government of Jammu and Kashmir started building a motorable road along the route in 1954. The construction was suspended in 1958 after discovery of corruption among the contractors and engineers, and an enquiry was initiated. In 1960, the Government of India created the Border Roads Organisation (BRO) to take charge of strategic border roads and it was entrusted with completing the road. Setting up a 'Project Beacon' in Leh, the BRO completed the road by August 1962, and also extended it to Chushul by September 1962, just a few weeks before hostilities were initiated by China.

In addition to the Zoji La pass, the highway also had to cross the Ladakh Range between Kargil and Leh, via the Fotu La pass—4,108 metres (13,478 ft)—which is however less snowbound than Zoji La.

A segment of the highway came under attack by Pakistani soldiers between Drass and Kargil in 1999, who occupied the mountain tops on the Indian side of the Line of Control and shelled the highway. This led to the Kargil War, which ended by the Indian Army eventually evicting the Pakistani army

== Route description ==
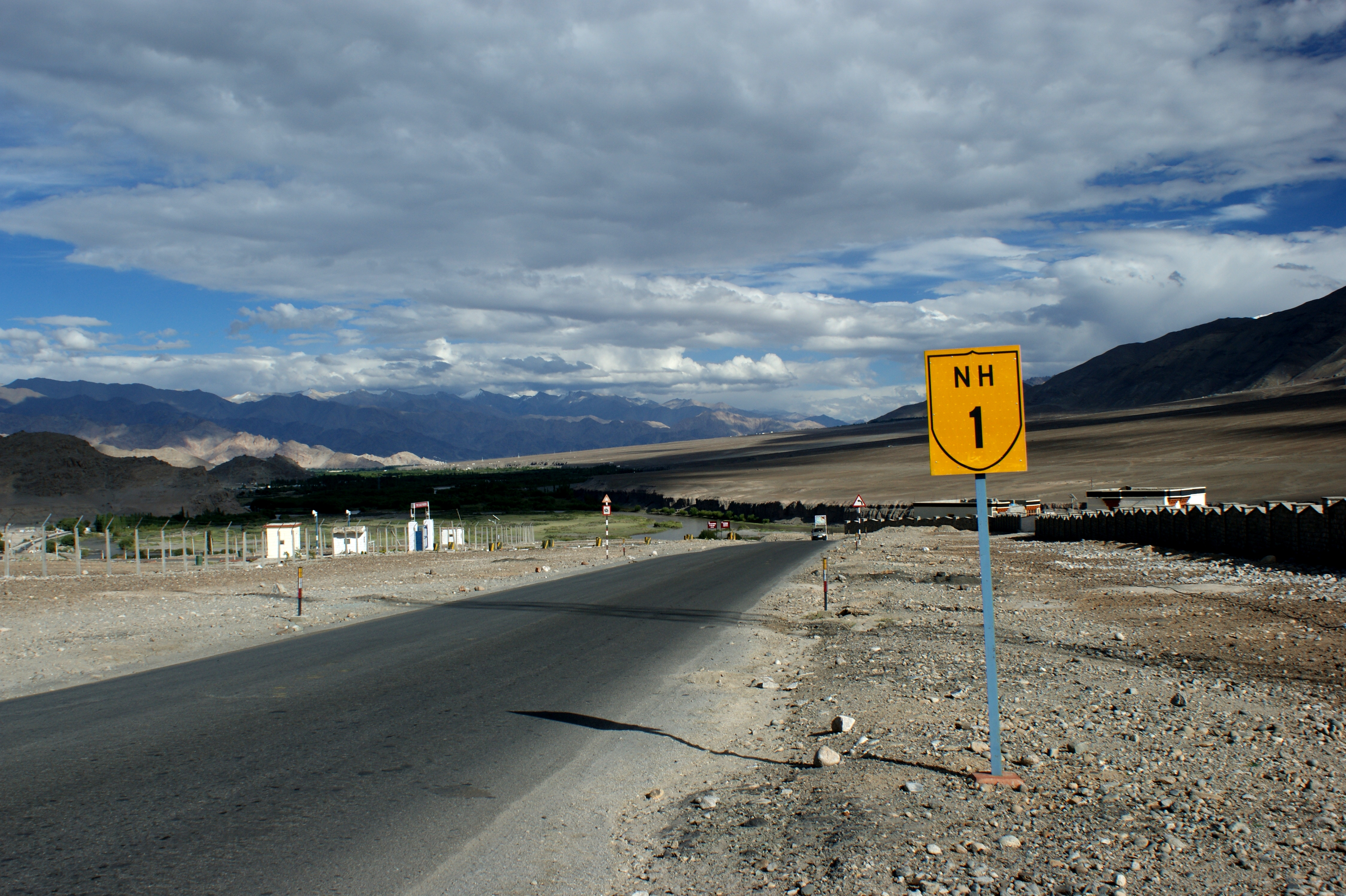
National Highway 1 near Leh, Ladakh

NH 1 passes from Uri to Baramulla, Srinagar, Sonamarg, Zoji La, Dras, Kargil and Leh. The route passes through high mountain passes and most of the road clings to mountainsides. The NH is the lifeline of the Ladakh region. An alternative route, the Leh-Manali Highway, exists but it climbs over even higher mountain passes. NH 1 passes near the India-Pakistan border.

== Major intersections ==
District	Location	km	Mile	Destinations	Notes
Leh	Leh	0.0	0.0	NH 3	East end
Kargil	Kargil	217.4	135.1	NH 301	
Budgam	Srinagar	431.4	268.1	NH 444	
Srinagar		445.1	276.6	NH 44	old NH1A
Baramulla	Baramulla	510.3	317.1	NH 701A	
Baramulla	Baramulla	510.6	317.3	NH 701	
Baramulla		574.1	356.7	S-3 Strategic Highway	West end
1.000 mi = 1.609 km; 1.000 km = 0.621 mi

== Traffic ==
The Jammu and Kashmir State Road Transport Corporation (JKSRTC) operates regular Deluxe and Ordinary bus services between Srinagar and Leh on this route with an overnight halt at Kargil. Taxis (cars and jeeps) are also available at Srinagar for the journey.

== See also ==
- Various highways to Leh and Ladakh
- Leh-Manali Highway
- NH301 Padum-Kargil Highway
- List of national highways in India

== Bibliography ==
- Das, Pushpita (2021), India's Approach to Border Management: From Barriers to Bridges (PDF), KW Publishers & Manohar Parrikar Institute for Defence Studies and Analyses
