= Zoji La =

Himalayan mountain pass in Ladakh, India

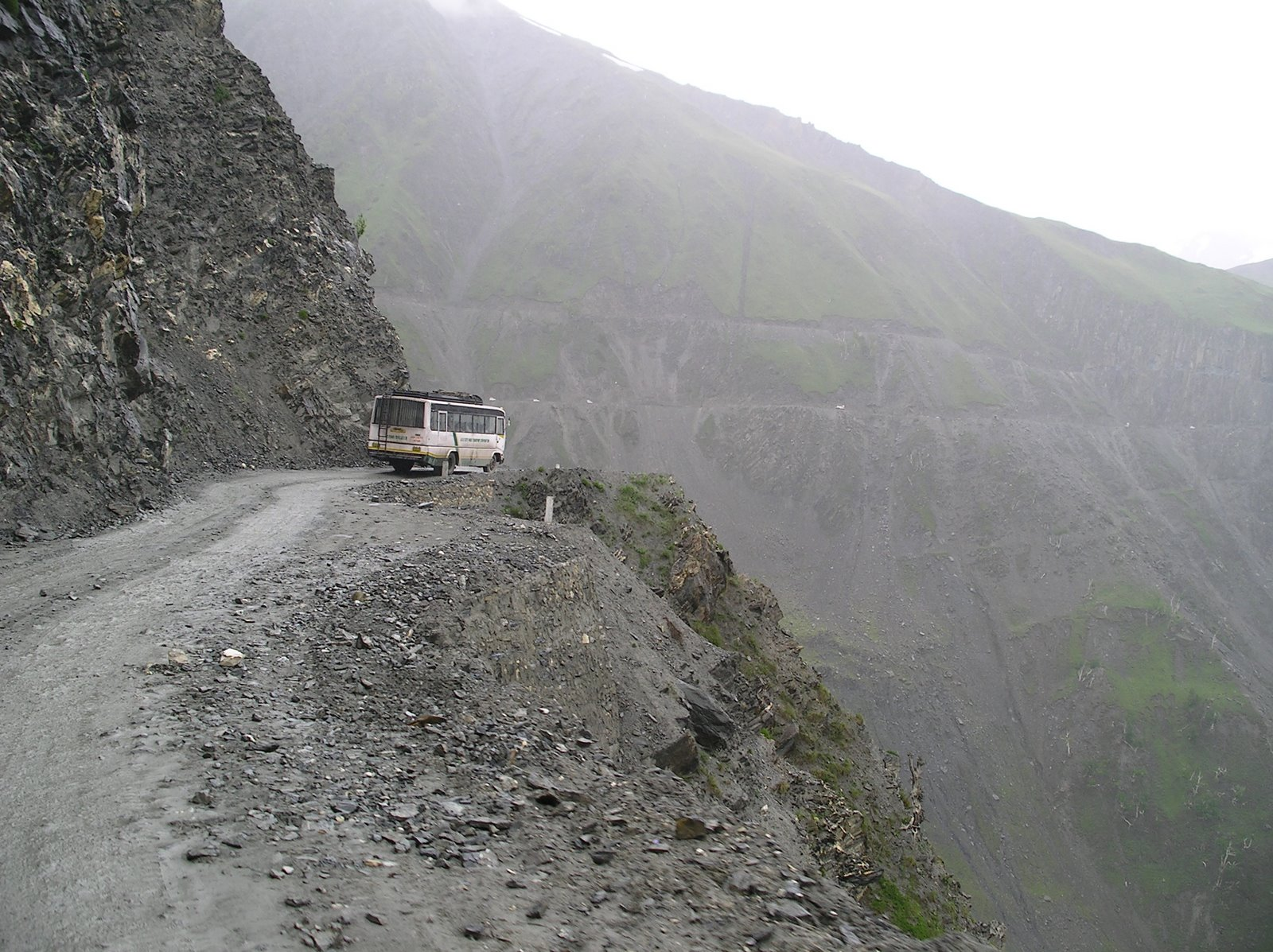
- Zoji La in June 2004

- Location within Jammu and Kashmir Location within India
- Interactive map of Zoji La
- Elevation: 3580m
- Traversed by: Srinagar–Leh Highway

Third Approach
- Location: Jammu and Kashmir and Ladakh, India
- Range: Himalayas
- Coordinates: 34°16′44″N 75°28′19″E

Zoji La (sometimes Zojila Pass) is a high mountain pass in the Himalayas. It is located in the Ganderbal district of Jammu and Kashmir and the Kargil district of Ladakh, both union territories of India. This pass connects the Kashmir Valley to its west with the Dras and Suru valleys to its northeast and the Indus valley further east. National Highway #1 between Srinagar and Leh in the western section of the Himalayan mountain range, traverses the pass. As of late 2022, an all-weather Zoji-la Tunnel is under construction to mitigate seasonal road blockages due to heavy snowfall.

== Etymology ==
According to some sources, Zoji La means the "mountain pass of blizzards". The word for blizzards, however, is བུ་ཡུག་ (wylie bu-yug). Based on oral tradition that survived among the local people, Zoji refers to Du-Zhi-la, the goddess of Tibet’s four seasons. The Du-Zhi-lha-mo legend (དུས་བཞི་ལྷ་མོ ) describes her as the wife of Naropa.

The pass is also referred to as "Zojila Pass", which is a misnomer. The word "pass" is redundant because the suffix "La/Lah" itself means a mountain pass in Tibetan, Ladakhi, and several other languages spoken in the Himalayan region. (Note: Other examples of this use of "La / Lah" are Nathu La (on the Sikkim–Tibet border), Baralacha La (on the Leh–Manali Highway), Khardung La, Fotu La, Namika La and Pensi La, to name only a few.)

== Climate ==
Climate data for Zojila Pass {1981–2023 via satellite based observations ( All values are rounded to the nearest integer )}
Month	Jan	Feb	Mar	Apr	May	Jun	Jul	Aug	Sep	Oct	Nov	Dec	Year
Record high °C (°F)	−2 (28)	3 (37)	13 (55)	18 (64)	23 (73)	29 (84)	32 (90)	32 (90)	29 (84)	20 (68)	11 (52)	2 (36)	32 (90)
Mean daily maximum °C (°F)	−13 (9)	−10 (14)	−4 (25)	4 (39)	9 (48)	11 (52)	13 (55)	13 (55)	11 (52)	7 (45)	−6 (21)	−10 (14)	2 (36)
Mean daily minimum °C (°F)	−22 (−8)	−21 (−6)	−13 (9)	−4 (25)	−1 (30)	7 (45)	9 (48)	9 (48)	8 (46)	−6 (21)	−13 (9)	−21 (−6)	−6 (22)
Record low °C (°F)	−44 (−47)	−41 (−42)	−32 (−26)	−19 (−2)	−11 (12)	−8 (18)	1 (34)	−1 (30)	−7 (19)	−20 (−4)	−34 (−29)	−43 (−45)	−44 (−47)
Average rainfall mm (inches)	220 (8.7)	242 (9.5)	420 (16.5)	340 (13.4)	203 (8.0)	182 (7.2)	230 (9.1)	210 (8.3)	180 (7.1)	92 (3.6)	83 (3.3)	228 (9.0)	2,630 (103.7)
Source: India Meteorological Department

== Location ==
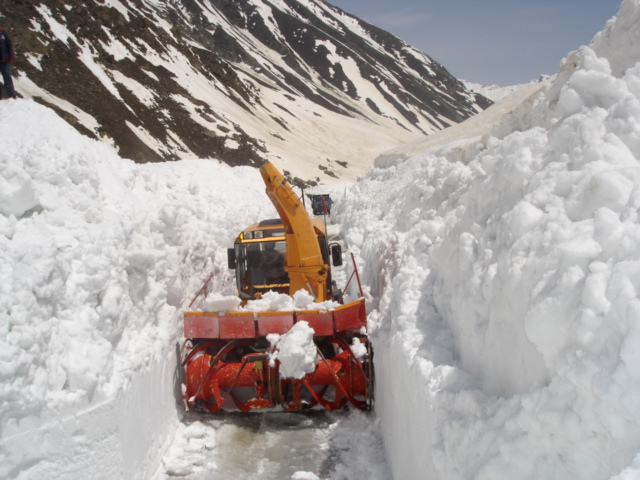
Snow cutting machine on the Zoji La

Zoji La is about 100 km from Srinagar, the capital of the Union Territory of Jammu and Kashmir, and 15 km from Sonmarg. It provides a vital link between Ladakh and the Kashmir Valley. It runs at an elevation of approximately 5,008 metres (16,430 ft), and is the second-highest pass after Fotu La on the Srinagar–Leh National Highway. It is often closed during winter, though the Border Roads Organisation (BRO) works to keep the pass open when possible; driving through the pass in winter means driving between thick walls of ice on both sides.

== History ==
=== First Kashmir War ===
During the First Kashmir War, Zoji La was seized by Gilgit rebels in 1948 in their campaign to capture Ladakh. Pakistan Army led by Maj. Muhammad Khan Jarral conquered Zojila pass in 1948. The pass was recaptured by Indian forces on 1 November in an assault codenamed Operation Bison, which achieved its objective primarily due to the surprising use of tanks by Indian forces. At the time, this was the highest altitude at which tanks had operated in combat in the world.

== Zoji La tunnel ==
The Zoji-la Tunnel project was approved by the government in January 2018. Construction was inaugurated by Prime Minister Narendra Modi in May 2018. The 14 km long tunnel will reduce the time to cross the Zoji La from over 3 hours to just 15 minutes. The initial cost of the tunnel is US$930 million. When completed, it will be the longest bidirectional tunnel in Asia.

== See also ==
- Machoi Glacier
