= Gangotri (disambiguation) =

Gangotri is a town and pilgrimage centre in Uttarakhand, India.

Gangotri may also refer to:

- Gangotri Bhandari (born 1956), former player of Indian women's hockey team
- Gangotri Kujur, Indian politician
- Gangotri Glacier, the source of Bhagirathi River
- Gangotri (cow), a temple cow in Britain killed by the RSPCA
- Gangotri (film), 2003 Telugu film directed by K. Raghavendra Rao
- Gangotri (2007 film), 2007 Bhojpuri film
- Gangothri (film), a 1997 Indian Malayalam film
- Gangotri National Park, national park located in Uttarkashi District, Uttarakhand, India
- Gangotri Group of mountains with peaks up to around 6,600 m AMSL, a subdivision of the Garhwal Himalaya in Uttarakhand, India, enclosing Gangotri Glacier
- Dakshin Gangotri, Indian scientific base station in Antarctica
- Dakshin Gangotri Glacier, Antarctic Specially Protected Area in the Schirmacher Oasis
