= Postal Index Number =

Code in the post office numbering or post code system used by India Post

A Postal Index Number (PIN; sometimes redundantly a PIN Code) (Note: Sometimes incorrectly written as "Pin code", "Pincode", "PINcode", or "pincode".) refers to a six-digit code in the Indian postal code system used by India Post.

== History ==
The PIN system was introduced on 15 August 1972 by Shriram Bhikaji Velankar, an additional secretary in the Government of India's Ministry of Communications. The system was introduced to simplify the manual sorting and delivery of mail by eliminating confusion over incorrect addresses, similar place names, and different languages used by the public.

== PIN structure ==
An example of a Postal Index Number from Ujjain in Madhya Pradesh. 4 indicates the West postal zone, 5 indicates a postal sub-zone in Madhya Pradesh, 6 indicates the Ujjain sorting district, 0 indicates the Ujjain core area service route, 01 indicates the Ujjain Head Office as the delivery office.

The first digit of a PIN indicates the zone, the second indicates the sub-zone, and the third, combined with the first two, indicates the sorting district within that zone. The final three digits are assigned to individual post offices within the sorting district.

=== Postal zones ===
There are nine postal zones in India, including eight regional zones and one functional zone (for the Indian Army). The first digit of a PIN indicates the zone and is allocated over the 9 zones as follows:

| 1st digit of PIN | Zone | States or Union Territories |
|---|---|---|
| 1 | North | National Capital Territory of Delhi; State of Haryana; State of Himachal Pradesh; State of Punjab; Union Territory of Chandigarh; Union Territory of Jammu and Kashmir; Union Territory of Ladakh |
| 2 | North | State of Uttarakhand; State of Uttar Pradesh |
| 3 | West | State of Gujarat; State of Rajasthan; Union Territory of Dadra and Nagar Haveli and Daman and Diu |
| 4 | West | State of Chhattisgarh; State of Goa; State of Madhya Pradesh; State of Maharashtra |
| 5 | South | State of Andhra Pradesh; State of Karnataka; State of Telangana |
| 6 | South | State of Kerala; State of Tamil Nadu; Union Territory of Puducherry; Union Territory of Lakshadweep |
| 7 | East | State of Arunachal Pradesh; State of Assam; State of Manipur; State of Meghalaya; State of Mizoram; State of Nagaland; State of Odisha; State of Sikkim; State of Tripura; State of West Bengal; Union Territory of Andaman and Nicobar Islands |
| 8 | East | State of Bihar; State of Jharkhand |
| 9 | APS | Army Postal Service (APS); Field Post Office (FPO) |

=== Sorting district ===
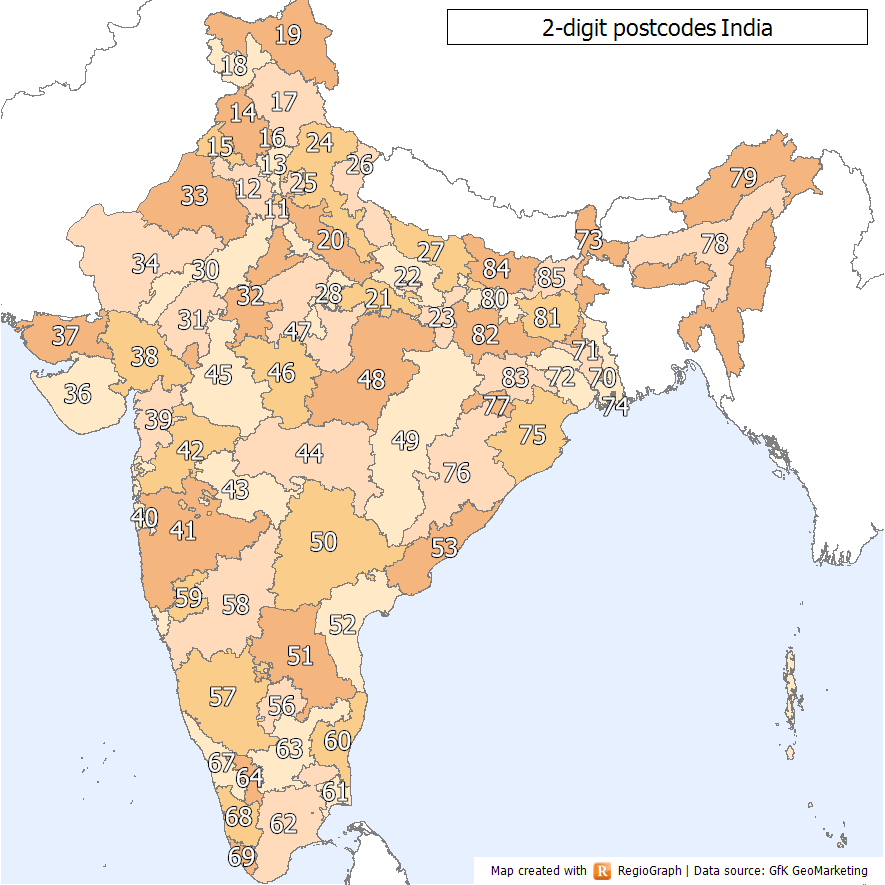
2-digit postcode areas in India (defined through the first two PIN digits)

The third digit of a PIN, combined with the first two digits, represents a specific geographical region (except in the case of the functional zone for the Army) called a sorting district that is headquartered at the main post office of the largest city in the region and is known as the sorting office. A state may have one or more sorting districts depending on the volume of mail handled.

| PIN prefix | Postal abbreviation | Region |
|---|---|---|
| 11 | DL | Delhi |
| 12–13 | HR | Haryana |
| 14–15 | PB | Punjab |
| 16 | CH | Chandigarh |
| 17 | HP | Himachal Pradesh |
| 18–19 | JK, LA | Jammu and Kashmir, Ladakh |
| 20–28 | UP, UK | Uttar Pradesh, Uttarakhand |
| 30–34 | RJ | Rajasthan |
| 36–39 (except 396) | GJ | Gujarat |
| 396 | DD | Dadra and Nagar Haveli and Daman and Diu |
| 40–44 (except 403) | MH | Maharashtra |
| 403 | GA | Goa |
| 45–48 | MP | Madhya Pradesh |
| 49 | CG | Chhattisgarh |
| 50 | TG | Telangana |
| 51–53 | AP | Andhra Pradesh |
| 56–59 | KA | Karnataka |
| 60–66 (except 605) | TN | Tamil Nadu |
| 605 | PY | Puducherry |
| 67–69 (except 682) | KL | Kerala |
| 682 | LD | Lakshadweep |
| 70–74 (except 737 & 744) | WB | West Bengal |
| 737 | SK | Sikkim |
| 744 | AN | Andaman and Nicobar Islands |
| 75–77 | OD | Odisha |
| 78 | AS | Assam |
| 790–792 | AR | Arunachal Pradesh |
| 793–794 | ML | Meghalaya |
| 795 | MN | Manipur |
| 796 | MZ | Mizoram |
| 797–798 | NL | Nagaland |
| 799 | TR | Tripura |
| 80–85 | BR, JH | Bihar, Jharkhand |
| 90–99 | APS | Army Postal Service |

=== Service route ===
The fourth digit represents the route on which a delivery office is located in the sorting district. This is "0" for offices in the core area of the sorting district.

=== Delivery office ===
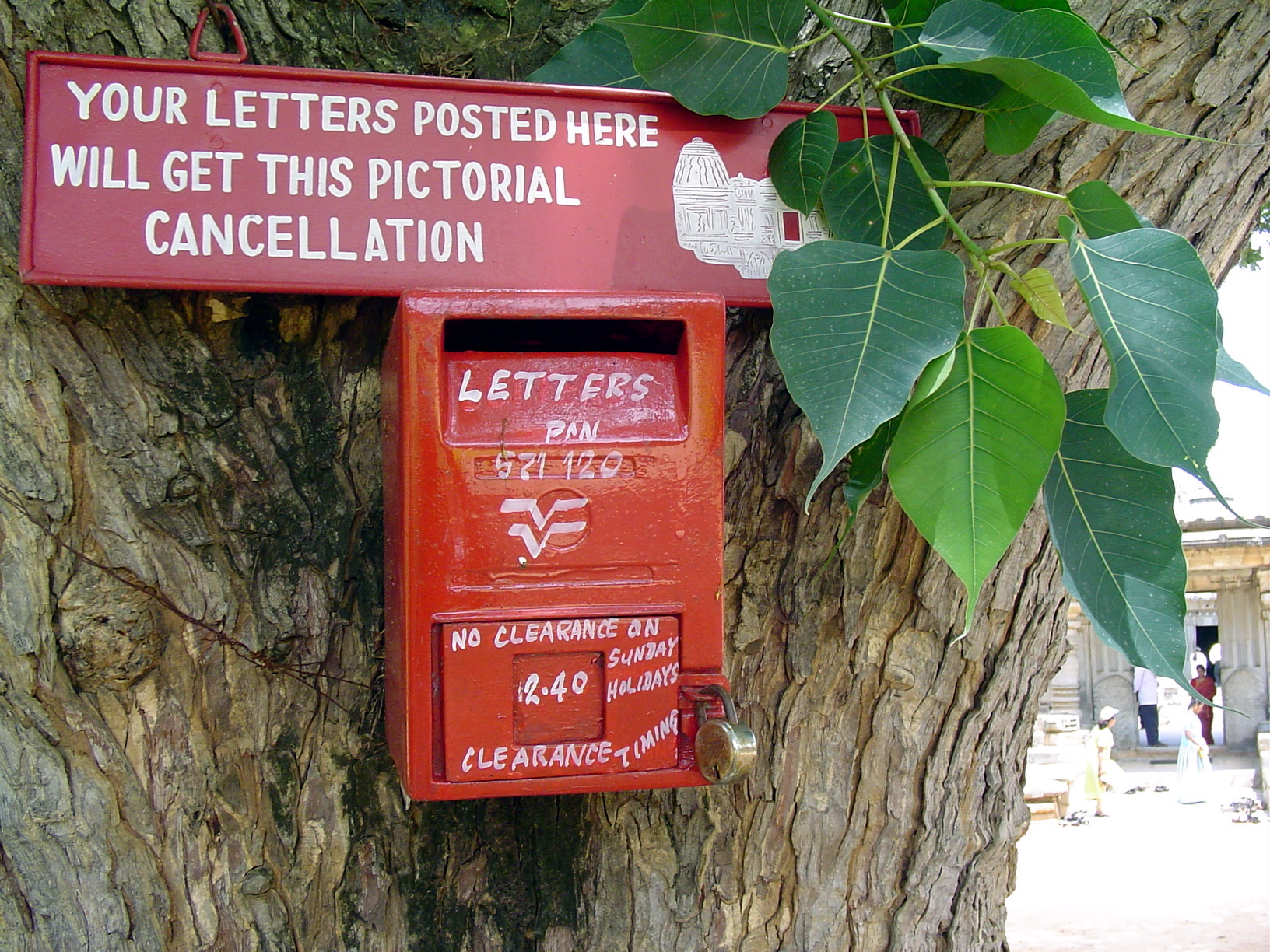
A post box with its PIN marked on it

The last two digits represent the delivery office within the sorting district starting from "01" which would be the General Post Office (GPO) or head office (HO). The numbering of the delivery office is done chronologically with higher numbers assigned to newer delivery offices. If the volume of mail handled at a delivery office is too large, a new delivery office is created and the next available PIN is assigned. Thus, two delivery offices situated next to each other will only have the first four digits in common.

=== Overseas mail ===
Special cases where mail needs to be sent to locations overseas is handled in an ad hoc manner. For example, the PIN of Dakshin Gangotri and Maitri, research stations located in Antarctica, is 403001, which is of the PIN of Panaji, Goa.

== Delivery system ==
Each PIN is mapped to exactly one delivery post office which receives all the mail to be delivered to one or lower offices within its jurisdiction, all of which share the same code. The delivery office can either be a General Post Office (GPO), a head office (HO), or a sub-office (SO) which are usually located in urban areas. The post from the delivery office is sorted and routed to other delivery offices for a different PIN or to one of the relevant sub-offices or branch offices for the same PIN. Branch offices (BOs) are located in rural areas and have limited postal services.

== Digital Postal Index Number ==
DIGIPIN or Digital Postal Index Number is India Post's new, precise digital addressing system, using a 10-character alphanumeric code for exact locations (within a 4m x 4m grid) instead of broad pin codes, developed with IIT Hyderabad and ISRO for better logistics, e-commerce, and emergency services by offering a uniform, open-source, and interoperable location standard.
