= Bharati (research station) =

Bharati Station
- Antarctic Research Station
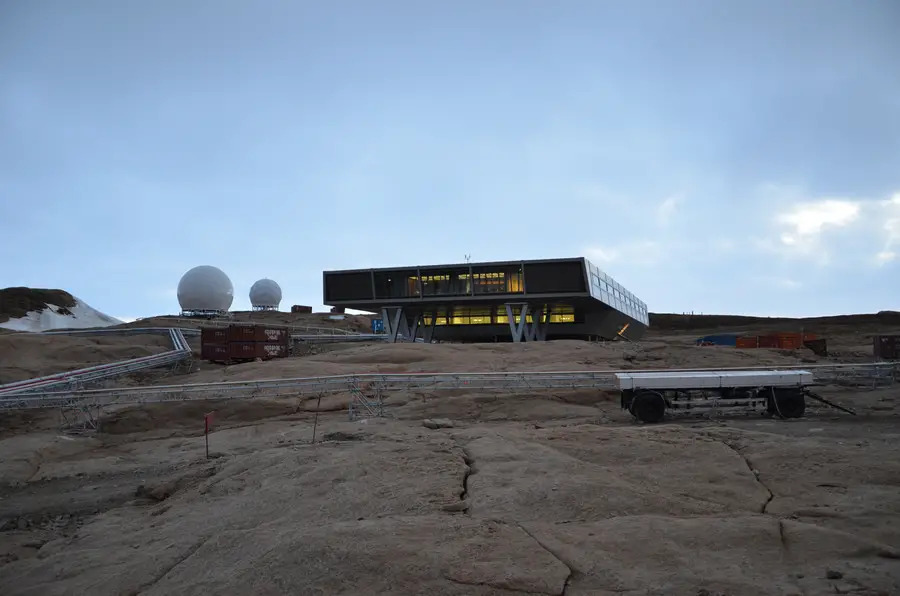
- Bharati Station

- Location of Bharati Station in Antarctica
- Coordinates: 69°24′29″S 76°11′14″E
- Country: India
- Location in Antarctica: Larsemann Hills; Prydz Bay
- Administered by: National Centre for Polar and Ocean Research
- Established: 18 March 2012
- Elevation: 35 m (115 ft)

Population (2017)
  - Summer: 46
  - Winter: 23
- Type: All-year round
- Period: Annual
- Status: Operational
- Activities: List: Oceanography; Geology
- Website: National Centre for Antarctic and Ocean Research

Bharati Heliport
- IATA: none; ICAO: none

Summary
- Airport type: Private
- Owner/Operator: National Centre for Polar and Ocean Research
- Location: Bharati Station; Larsemann Hills
- Coordinates: 69°24′24″S 76°11′36″E

Map
- Location of airfield in Antarctica

Runways
Direction	Length		Surface
Direction	ft	m	Surface
			Concrete

Bharati is a permanent Antarctic research station commissioned by India. It is India's third Antarctic research facility and one of two active Indian research stations, alongside Maitri. India's first committed research facility, Dakshin Gangotri, is being used as a supply base. India has demarcated an area beside the Larsemann Hills at 69°S, 76°E for construction. The research station has been operational since 18 March 2012. Since its completion, India has become one of nine nations to have multiple stations within the Antarctic Circle. Bharati's research mandate focuses on oceanographic studies and the phenomenon of continental breakup. It also facilitates research to refine the current understanding of the Indian subcontinent's geological history. News sources have referred to the station as "Bharathi", "Bharti" and "Bharati".

== Facilities ==
The project for setting up of the ground was undertaken by the Electronics Corporation of India Limited (ECIL) from the National Remote Sensing Centre (NRSC) for a contract value of ₹230 crore (US$25 million). The station building, with a floor area of 2,162 square metres (23,270 sq ft), was constructed in 127 days. The station can host a total of 72 personnel, 47 in the main building all year round and an additional 25 in shelters during summer. The main station building is supported by a fuel farm and station, sea water pump and a summer camp.

This station is also being utilized by the Indian Space Research Organisation (ISRO) for Antarctica Ground Station for Earth Observation Satellites (AGEOS), for receiving Indian Remote sensing Satellite (IRS) (like CARTOSAT-2, SCATSAT-1, RESOURCESAT-2/2A and CARTOSAT-1 satellites) raw data and beaming back this high-speed satellite raw data in real time from Bharati Station to NRSC in Hyderabad for processing the images since mid 2010s.

In 2007, ECIL also established the communication link between Maitri, the second Indian research station in Antarctica, and the National Centre for Polar and Ocean Research (NCPOR). Among others, research on tectonics and geological structures would be undertaken at Bharati Station by Indian scientists.

India also became the first nation to use the shipping containers as integral part of construction and hence constructing its base in record time and money.

== Discoveries and achievements ==
In January 2017, Felix Bast, one of the scientists on the 36th Indian expedition to the Antarctic, discovered a new moss species at Larsemann Hills, near the Bharati research station, and named it Bryum bharatiense.

== See also ==
- Australian Antarctic Territory
- Dakshin Gangotri First Indian station 1983, converted to support base
- Maitri Second Indian station 1989
- Defence Research and Development Organisation
- Defence Institute of High Altitude Research
- Indian Antarctic Program
- Indian Astronomical Observatory
- Jantar Mantar, Jaipur
- National Centre for Polar and Ocean Research
- Siachen Base Camp (India)
- List of Antarctic field camps
- List of Antarctic research stations
- List of highest astronomical observatories
