= Siachen Base Camp (India) =

Military camp in Siachen Glacier

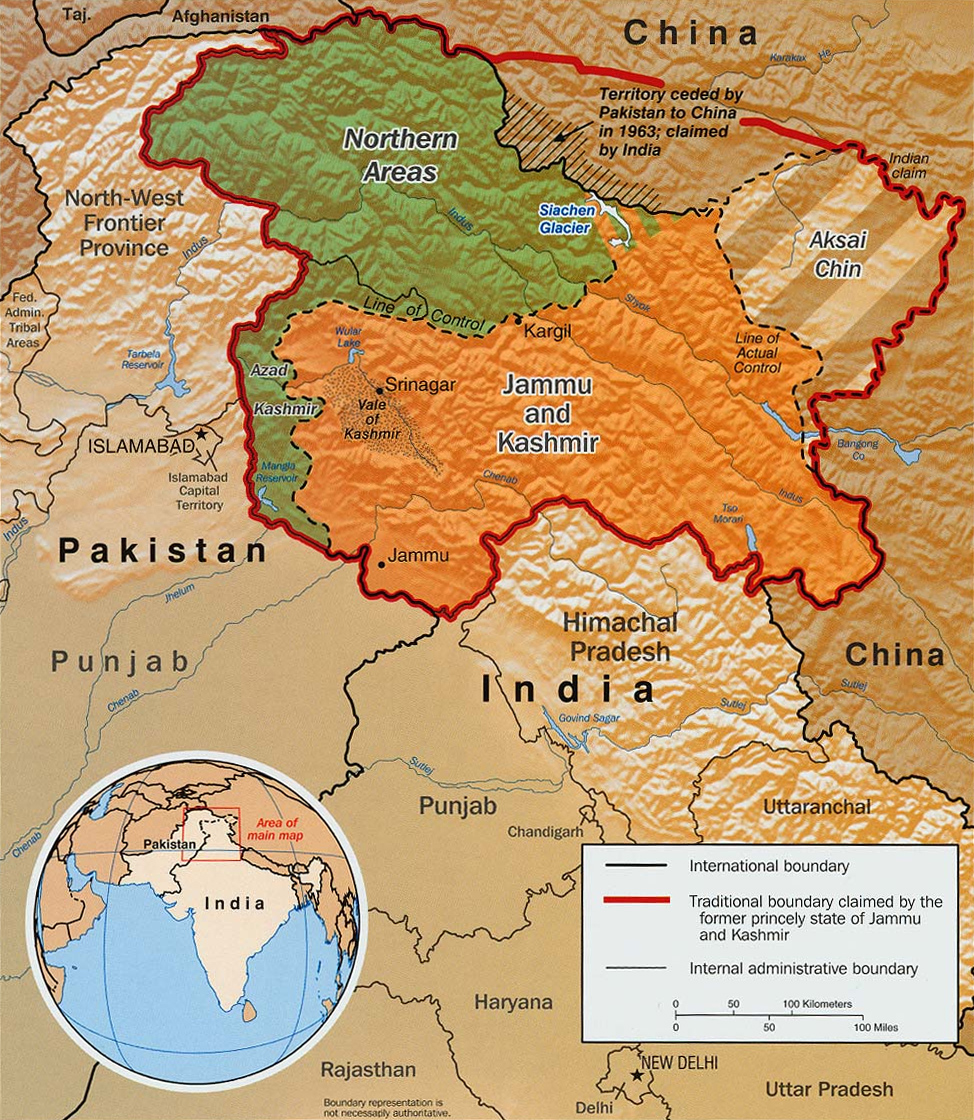
Indo-Pak mutually-agreed undisputed "International Border" (IB) in the black line, Indo-Pak "Line of Control" (LoC) in black dotted line in the north and west, Indo-Sino "Line of Actual" (LAC) in black dotted line in the east, Indo-Pak line across Siachen in north is "Actual Ground Position Line" (AGPL). The areas shown in green are the two Pakistani-controlled areas: Gilgit–Baltistan in the north and Azad Kashmir in the south. The area shown in orange is the Indian-controlled territories of Jammu and Kashmir, and Ladakh, and the diagonally-hatched area to the east is the Chinese-controlled area known as Aksai Chin. "Territories ceded by Pakistan to China claimed by India" in the north is Shaksgam (Trans-Karakoram Tract).

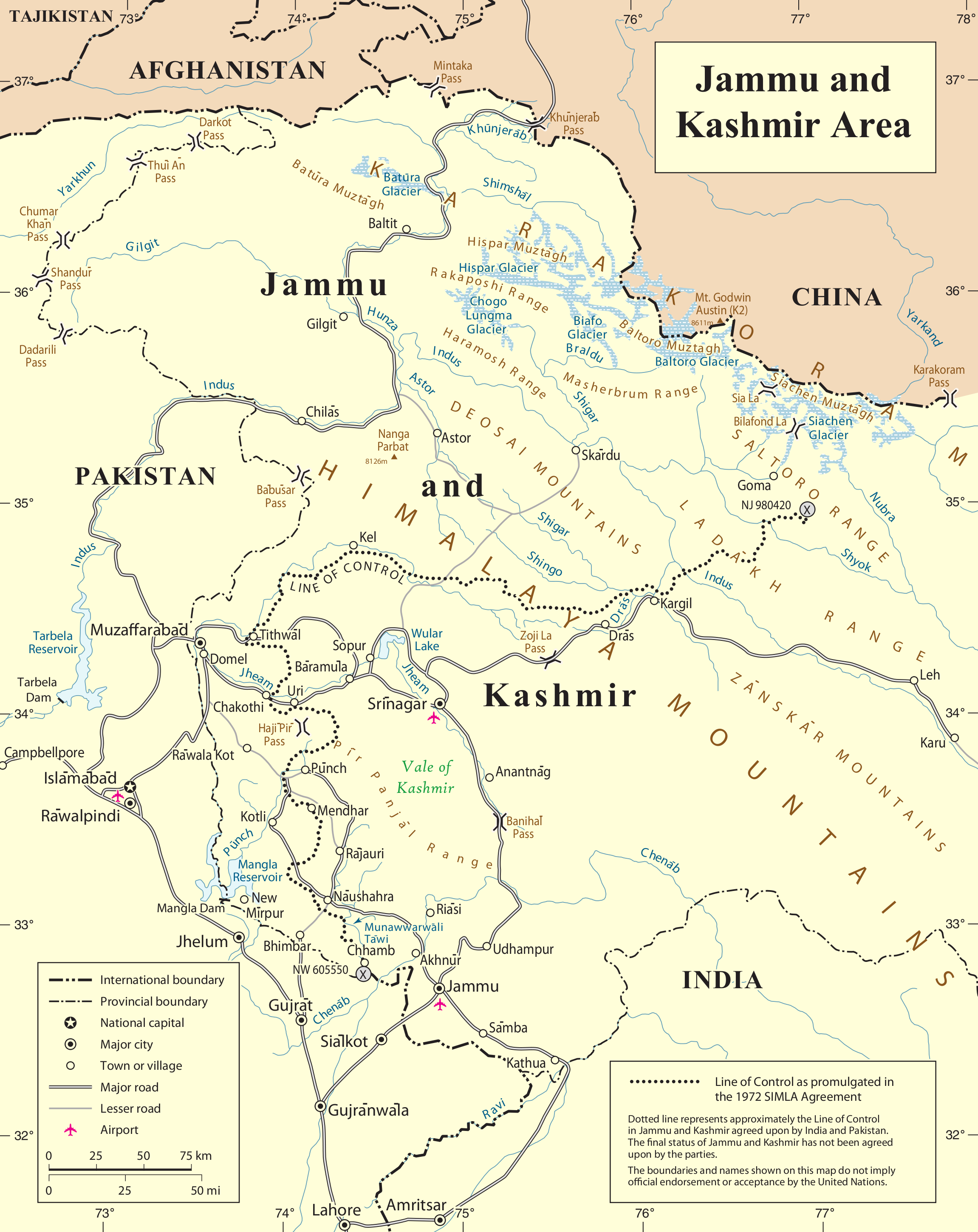
United Nations map of Siachen Glacier showing "Point NJ980420" (Point NJ9842) as the starting point of the "Actual Ground Position Line" (AGPL) and the Nubra River valley and Siachen Glacier held by India. The AGPL starts from NJ9842 and goes north near Gyong La, Chumik Kangri, Saltoro Kangri, Bilafond La, and Sia La to Indira Col West. Goma military camp, Masherbrum Range, Baltoro Glacier, Baltoro Glacier, Baltoro Muztagh and K2 to the west are held by Pakistan.

Siachen Base Camp, 12,000 feet above sea level at Partapur, is a base camp of 102 Infantry Brigade (Siachen brigade) of XIV Corps of Indian Army which protects 110 km long Actual Ground Position Line (AGPL) with at least 108 forward military outposts and artillery observation posts in the disputed region of Siachen Glacier in Ladakh Union Territory of India. It is approximately 6 hours drive north from the town of Leh via one of the highest vehicle-accessible passes in the world, Khardung La at 17,582 feet. Bana Top (20,500 ft) is the highest post in the region, which requires 80 km and 20 day trek for troops. Pahalwan Post (about 20,000 ft) and posts near Indira Col (about 19,000 ft) are other high posts. Kumar Post or Kumar Base, named after the Colonel Narendra "Bull" Kumar, serves as the battalion head quarter located 60 km from the Siachen base towards Indira Col. The Siachen Brigade consists of five to eight battalions of Ladakh Scouts supported by artillery, air defence, engineer and other logistic units. Pakistan has not been able to scale the crest of the Saltoro Range occupied by India. The temperature goes down to minus 86 °C during winters with icy 300 kmph blizzards. The average temperature is between minus 25 °C during day and minus 55 °C during the night.

Siachen Base Camp, which serves the northern and middle Siachen sectors, is one of the 2 bases for the Siachen region, and other base being just west of Thoise Air Base which serves the southern Siachen sector. Siachen Base Camp has Siachen Battle School for pre-induction training, orientation and acclimatisation for fresh troops and it is also a launchpad for deployment of the acclimatised troops who are usually deployed on a 2 to 3 month stint on the forward post. The base has helipads, a memorial for martyrs, medical unit etc and it is connected by a motorable road. 12 Wing of Chandigarh AFSB of Indian Air Force (IAF) provides helicopter support to the forward posts for the logistics supplies and casualty evacuation by helicopter from air bases at Leh, Thoise and Srinagar, which in turn are supplied by the large transport planes such as C-17 and C-130. Each post has an artillery officer who are deployed in the rotation of 45 days. India has significant tactical advantage as it occupies most of the higher peaks on the Saltoro Mountain Range in the western sector of Siachen and Pakistan Army hold posts only at lower heights of western slopes of the spurs of the Saltoro ridge.

For the military operation, to ferry two people and their supplies, a minimum of 2–4 helicopter trips are required. Each helicopter trip cost ₹ 35,000 (year 2012). For example, it took 20 days and 200 helicopter trips for the assault team to gather at Bilafond La for the Operation Rajiv in 1987. For every soldier on the combat post, 20 soldiers are needed at the base for replacement training, logistics and support.

Until 2013, 26 decorations have been awarded to the Indian soldiers in this sectors, including 1 Paramvir Chakra (PVC), 5 Mahavir Chakra and 20 Vir Chakra to 11 officers and 15 OR of which 9 are posthumous. Additionally, many more Kirti Chakra, Shaurya Chakra, Sena Medal and Vayu Sena Medal have been awarded in this sectors.

== History ==
Colonel Narendra Bull Kumar took expeditions to the Siachen area in 1978, 1982, 1983 and 1984 to scale Sia Kangri (24,350 feet) and Indira Col and Saltoro Kangri-I (25,400 feet), and skied to Bilafond La, Sia La and Turkistan La.

This area was captured by India in 1984 in Operation Meghdoot to preempt Pakistan's Operation Ababeel. In 1987, Operation Rajiv was launched to successfully capture Quaid Post from Pakistan which was renamed to Bana Post by India. The Quaid Post was manned by soldiers of the Shaheen Company (3rd commando battalion), a part of Pakistan's Special Services Group. It was commanded by Subedar Ataullah Mohammed.

== Tourism ==
India allows several tourist and civilian activities in Siachen area. To exploit the potential for tourism, the government is making ongoing efforts to improve connectivity. It is part of the Bharat Ranbhoomi Darshan initiative of the Indian Military which will boost border tourism, patriotism, local infrastructure and economy while reversing civilian outward migration from these remote locations, it entails 77 battleground war memorials in border area including the Longewala War Memorial, Sadhewala War Memorial, Siachen base camp, Kargil, Galwan, Pangong Tso, Rezang La, Doklam, Bum La, Cho La, Kibithu, etc.

There is a recurring planned annual civilian expedition from Siachen Base Camp to Indira Ridge, Indira Col and other features. India has opened up the entire area from Siachen Base Camp at 12,000 ft to Kumar Post at 15,000 ft for the regular tourism for the civilians. Bana Post at 20,500 ft will remain off limit to tourists. Temperatures drop to below minus 60 degrees celsius during the winter.

Until 2010, civilian tourists were permitted only in the Nubra Valley up to Panamik. Since 2010 tourist have been permitted in the Shyok Valley up to Turtuk and beyond to Tyakshi near the LOC and further to Thang; these three villages and Chulunkha were captured from Pakistan by India in Indo-Pakistani War of 1971. From 2019, medically fit civilians below the age of 45 are allowed up to Kumar Base (15,000 ft) on a 30-day trek organised by Army Adventure Cell in August–September, during which tourists go through the highly altitude conditioning at Leh Base, Siachen Base and forward staging posts, at the end of which they undertake a 9-day return trek from Siachen Base to Kumar Base 60 km away.

== See also ==
Research

- Indian Antarctic Program
- Bharati (research station)
- Dakshin Gangotri First Indian station 1983, converted to support base
- Maitri Second Indian station 1989
- Defence Research and Development Organisation
- Defence Institute of High Altitude Research
- Indian Astronomical Observatory
- Jantar Mantar, Jaipur
- National Centre for Polar and Ocean Research
- List of Antarctic research stations
- List of Antarctic field camps
- List of highest astronomical observatories

Near the AGPL (Actual Ground Position Line)

- NJ9842 (peak) LoC ends and AGPL begins here
- Gharkun (peak)
- Gyong Kangri (peak)
- Gyong La (pass)
- Goma (Siachen)
- Gyari (valley)
- Chumik Kangri (peak)a
- K12 (mountain) (peak)
- Bana Top (peak)
- Bilafond La
- Saltoro Valley
- Ghent Kangri
- Sia La
- Sia Kangri
- Indira Col

Borders

- Actual Ground Position Line (AGPL)
- India–Pakistan International Border (IB)
- Line of Control (LoC)
- Line of Actual Control (LAC)
- Sir Creek (SC)
- Borders of China
- Borders of India

Conflicts

- Kashmir conflict
- Siachen conflict
- Sino-Indian conflict
- List of disputed territories of China
- List of disputed territories of India
- List of disputed territories of Pakistan
- Northern Areas
- Trans-Karakoram Tract

Operations

- Operation Meghdoot, by India
- Operation Rajiv, by India
- Operation Safed Sagar, by India

Other related topics

- 515 Army Base Workshop
- Awards and decorations of the Indian Armed Forces
- Bana Singh, after whom Quaid Post was renamed to Bana Top
- Dafdar, westernmost town in Trans-Karakoram Tract
- India-China Border Roads
- List of AGLs
- List of extreme points of India
- Sino-Pakistan Agreement for transfer of Trans-Karakoram Tract to China
