= Dakshin Gangotri Glacier =

Glacier in Antarctica

- Location of Dakshin Gangotri Glacier in Antarctica

- Location within Antarctica
- Type: small tongue
- Location: Queen Maud Land
- Coordinates: 70°45′S 11°35′E
- Thickness: unknown
- Status: unknown

The Dakshin Gangotri Glacier (70°45′S 11°35′E) is a small tongue of the polar continental ice sheet impinging on the Schirmacher Oasis of central Queen Maud Land, Antarctica. It was discovered by the Second Indian Expedition to Antarctica in 1983, and is named after the Gangotri Glacier in the Himalayas. The first Antarctic research base of India, Dakshin Gangotri is located near to the glacier. Since then its snout, and the area around it, has been regularly monitored and it has become a valuable site for tracking the impact of global warming through changes in the movement of the Antarctic ice sheet. The site is protected under the Antarctic Treaty System as Antarctic Specially Protected Area (ASPA) No.163.

== See also ==
- List of glaciers in the Antarctic
- Glaciology
