= Vijay Kumar Raina =

- Born: 1936
- Died: 26 July 2026 (aged 89–90)
- Scientific career
- Fields: Geology and glaciology

Vijay Kumar Raina (1936 – 26 July 2026) was an Indian geologist and glaciologist, and author of a controversial discussion paper from India's Ministry of Environment and Forests regarding Himalayan glaciers. He was formerly deputy director-general of the Geological Survey of India, and led two scientific expeditions conducted by the Indian Antarctic Program.

== Career ==
In June 1958, Raina led the first Geological Survey of India expedition to the Siachen glacier.

In the 1980s, Raina was the director general of the glaciology division at Geological Survey of India (GSI).

Raina retired in 1991, and died on 26 July 2026.

== Himalayan glacial melt controversy ==
On 10 July 2009, Raina visited the headquarters of the Ministry of Environment and Forests (MoEF) along with 40 other scientists to hear a report on satellite images of Himalayan glaciers prepared by the Space Application Centre (SAC).

On 4 August 2009, Raina submitted a paper outlining his dissent of the methodology of the SAC report and the claim that the Himalayan glaciers would disappear by 2035. Based on 150 years of GSI data on 25 Indian glaciers, Raina concluded: "It is premature to make a statement that glaciers in the Himalayas are retreating abnormally because of the global warming." Environment minister Jairam Ramesh released the report in November 2009.

Rajendra K. Pachauri, chairman of the Intergovernmental Panel on Climate Change (IPCC), disagreed with Raina's claims.

In 2022, Raina co-authored a report for the CATO Institute that claims the Himalayan glacial melt has been exaggerated.

== Works ==
Raina contributed to over 100 scientific papers and three books.

Raina was co-author of "Glacier Atlas of India" which is a collection of photographs and descriptions of glaciers.
