= Prosa del Observatorio =

From the Observatory
- First edition
- Author: Julio Cortázar
- Original title: Prosa del Observatorio
- Language: Spanish
- Genre: Poetry
- Publication date: 1972
- English publication date: 2011
- ISBN: 978-84-264-2317-7
- OCLC: 433156107

From the Observatory is the title of the English-language translation of Prosa del observatorio, a book of text and photographs by Julio Cortázar originally published in Spanish in 1972. The photographs depict the observatories of Maharajah Jai Singh; the text, largely in prose but with sections in verse, ranges meditatively over a number of matters, including eels.
