= Lake Priyadarshini =

Lake in Antarctica

- Location within Antarctica
- Location: Schirmacher Oasis, Antarctica
- Coordinates: 70.763°S 11.739°E
- Basin countries: (Antarctica)
- Frozen: March–February
- Settlements: Maitri

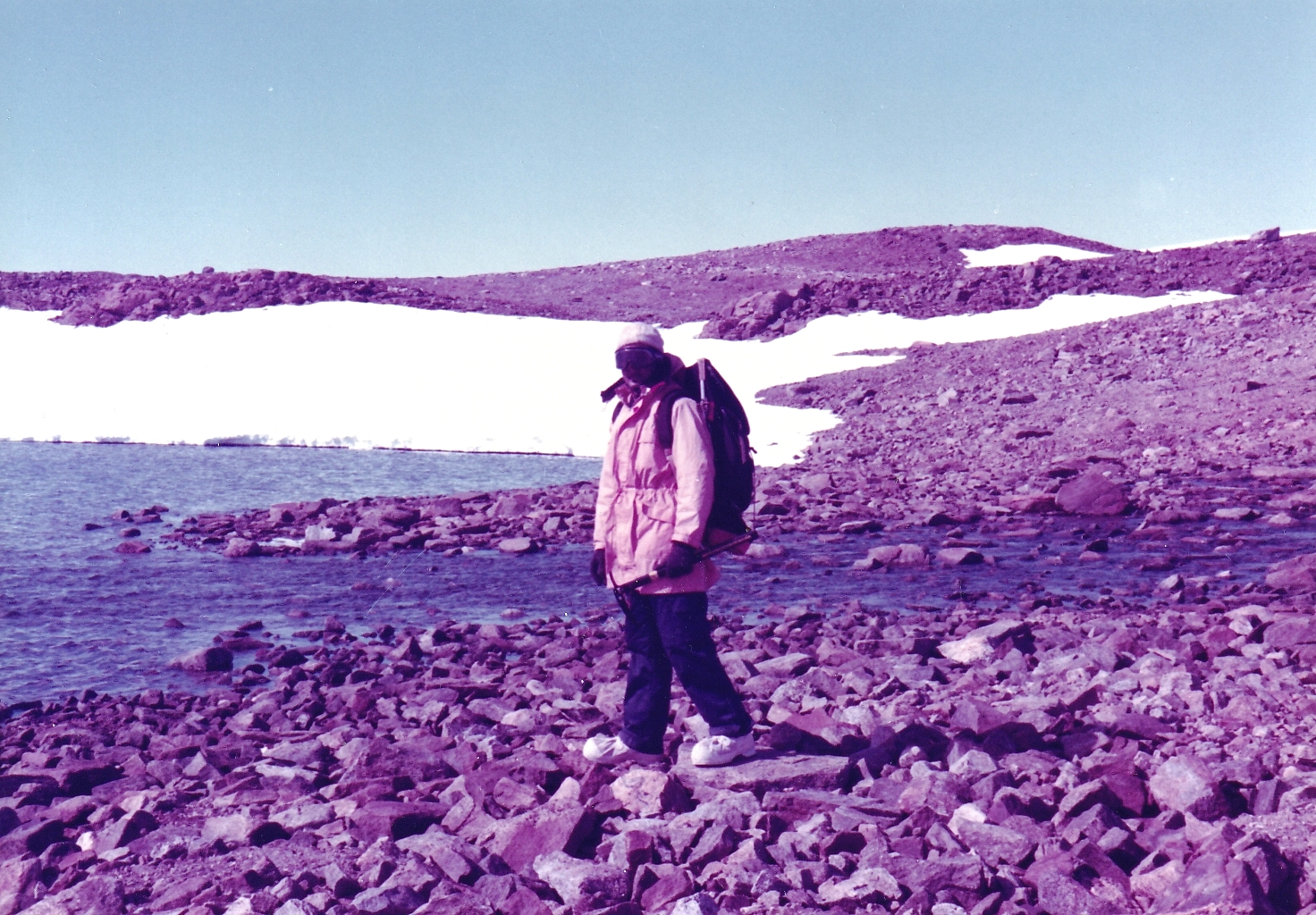
Mohammed Ghous uzzaman, a member of 7th Indian Antarctic Expedition, at Lake Indira Priyadarshini.

Lake Priyadarshini is a freshwater lake in the Schirmacher Oasis, Antarctica. It supplies water for Maitri, India's second permanent station in Antarctica. Lake Priyadarshini was named after the then Prime Minister of India Indira Priyadarshini Gandhi.

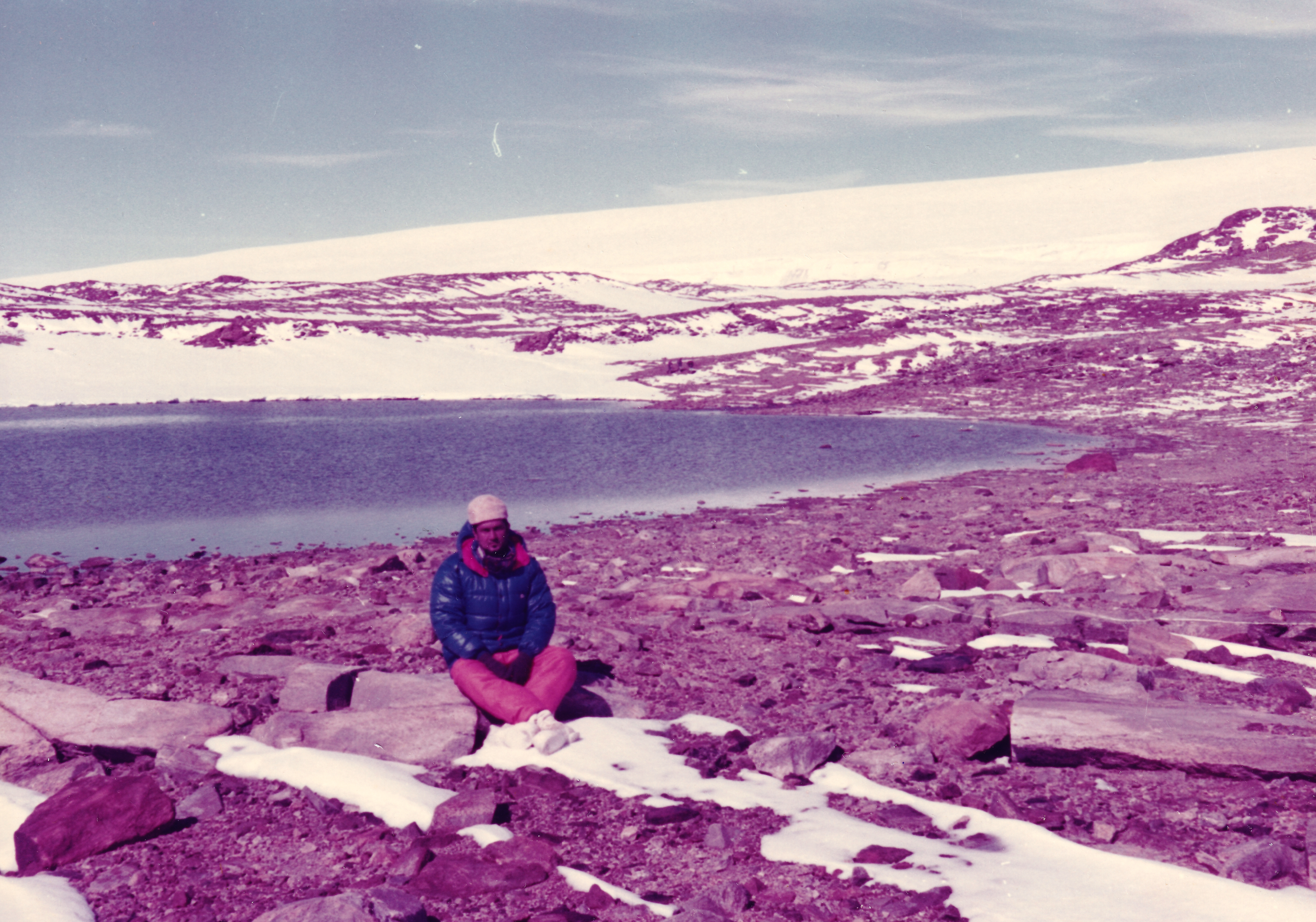
Mohammed Ghous uzzaman, a member of 7th Indian Antarctic Expedition at lake Indira Priyadarshini.
