= Indian Antarctic Programme =

Scientific programme started in 1981

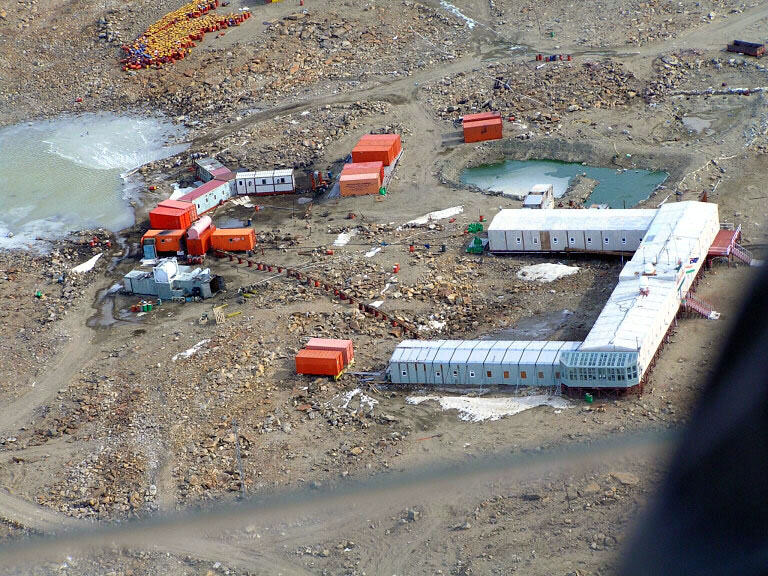
An aerial view of the Indian Station Maitri on 25 February 2005

The Indian Antarctic Programme is a multi-disciplinary, multi-institutional programme under the control of the National Centre for Polar and Ocean Research, Ministry of Earth Sciences, Government of India. It was initiated in 1981 with the first Indian expedition to Antarctica. The programme gained global acceptance with India's signing of the Antarctic Treaty and subsequent construction of the Dakshin Gangotri Antarctic research base in 1983, superseded by the Maitri base from 1989. The newest base commissioned in 2012 is Bharati, constructed out of 134 shipping containers. Under the programme, atmospheric, biological, earth, chemical, and medical sciences are studied by India, which has carried out 40 scientific expeditions to the Antarctic.

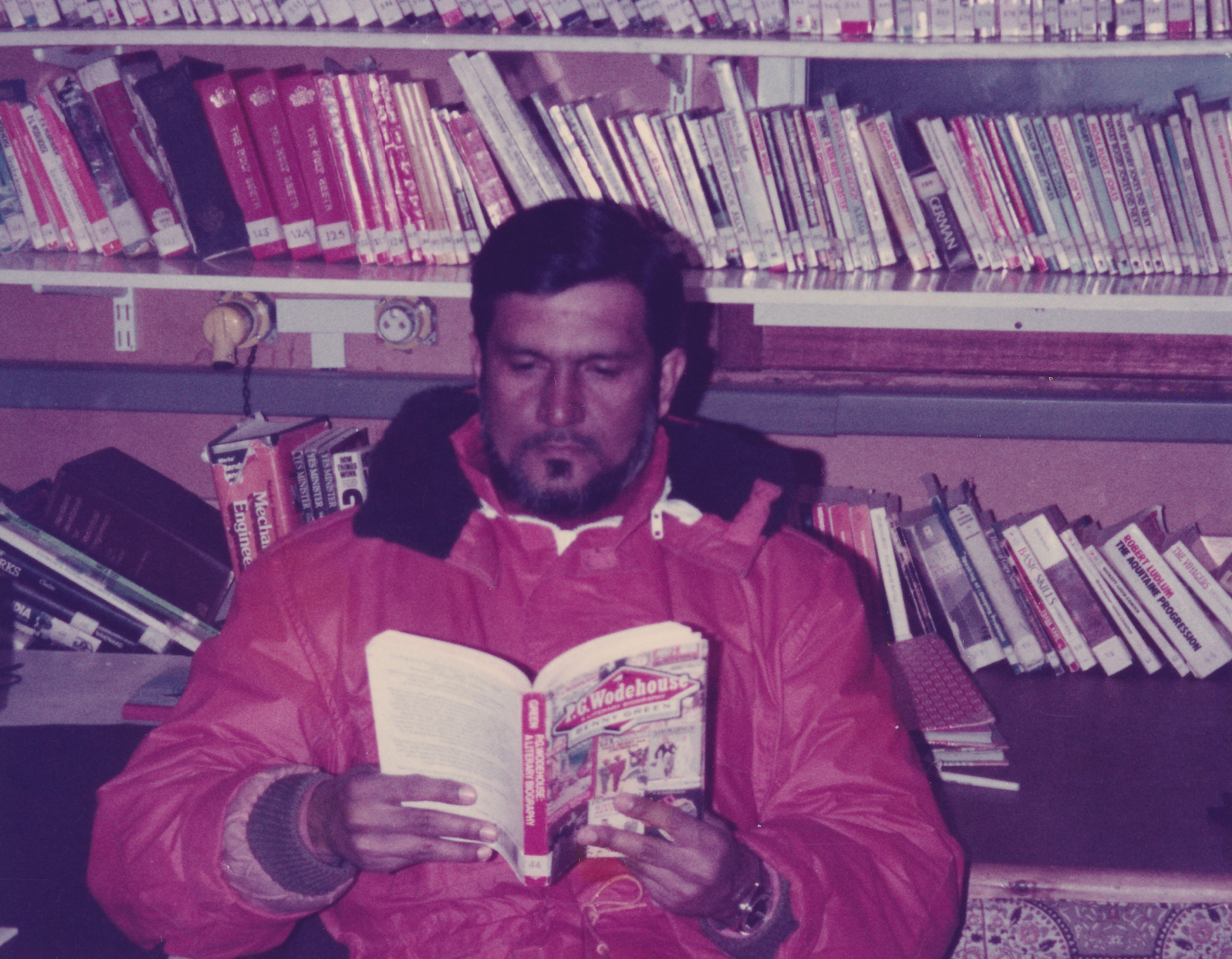
Mohammed Ghous uzzaman, a member of 7th Indian Antarctic Expedition Team at library, Dakshin Gangotri. (26 January 1988)

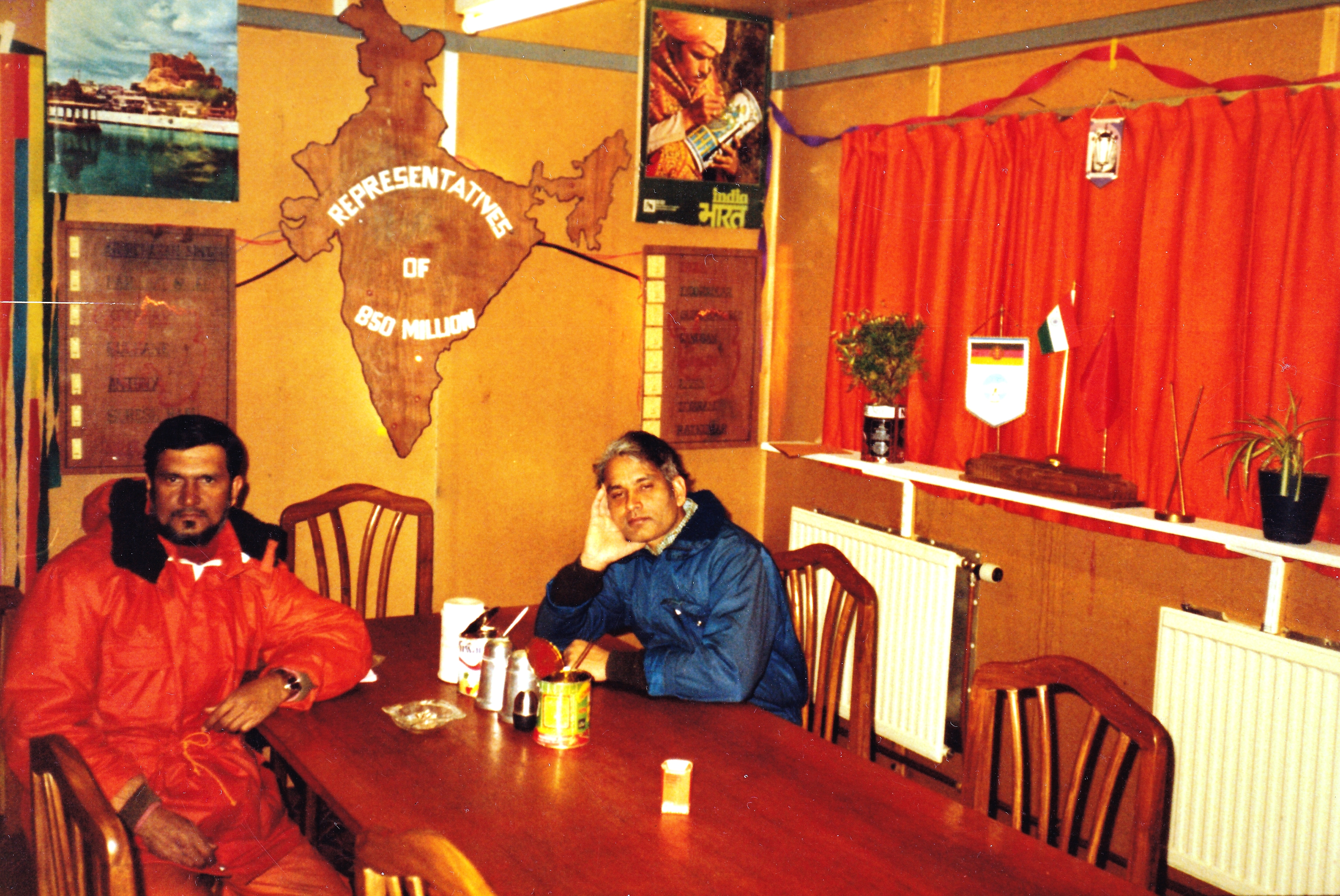
Mohammed Ghous uzzaman (Left) and M.Vyghreswara Rao (Right), members of 7th Indian Antarctic Expedition Team at Dakshin Gangotri, Antarctica. (26 January 1988)

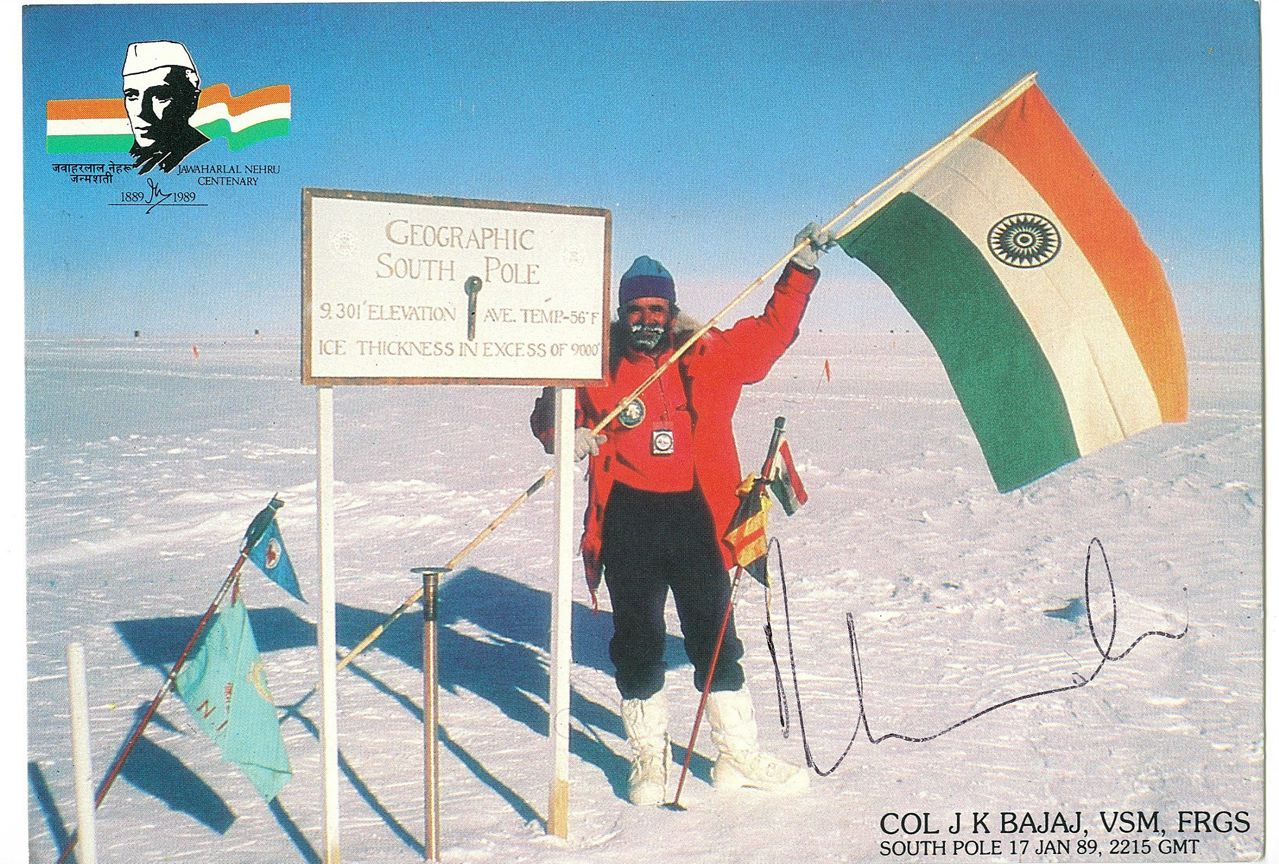
Col. Jatinder Kumar Bajaj, a member of one of the Indian expeditions to Antarctica, standing at the South Pole (17 January 1989)

Deck of the excursion ship Finnpolaris which was used for the second Indian expedition to Antartica.

== History ==
The origin of the Indian missions to the Antarctic are traced to the joint Indian Space Research Organisation – Hydrometeorological Centre of Russia agreements, which led to Indians, such as Dr. Parmjit Singh Sehra, joining the 17th Soviet Antarctic expedition of 1971–1973, Parmjit Singh Sehra - With rockets to India's Antarctic Program (in References).

India officially acceded to the Antarctic Treaty System on 1 August 1983. On 12 September 1983, the country became the fifteenth Consultative Member of the Antarctic Treaty.

== Organization ==
The National Centre for Polar and Ocean Research—a research and development body functioning under the Ministry of Earth Sciences, Government of India—controls the Indian Antarctic Programme. The NCPOR and the Department of Ocean Development select the members for India's Antarctic expeditions. After medical tests and subsequent acclimatisation training at the Himalayas, these selected members are also trained in survival, environment ethics, firefighting and operating in a group.

One expedition costs up to ₹200 million (US$2.1 million). Logistical support to the various activities of the Indian Antarctic Programme is provided by the relevant branches of the Indian armed forces. The launching point of Indian expeditions has varied from Goa in India to Cape Town in South Africa on 19th expedition during the time of NCAOR Founding Director Dr. P C Pandey in December 1999. Over 70 institutes in India contributed to its Antarctic Programme as of 2007.

== Global cooperation ==
The Indian Antarctic Programme is bound by the rules of the Antarctic Treaty System, which India signed in 1983. Pandey (2007) outlines the various international activities that India has undertaken as a part of its Antarctic Programme:

On 12 September 1983, India achieved the status of Consultative Party, on 1 October became a member of Scientific Committee on Antarctic Research (SCAR), and in 1986 became a member of the Convention for the Conservation of Antarctic Marine Living Resources (CCAMLR). In 1997 India also ratified the Protocol on Environmental Protection to the Antarctic Treaty thus reaffirming India's commitment to protecting the Antarctic environment. India hosted the eleventh COMNAP/SCALOP (Standing Committee on Antarctic Logistics and Operations) meeting in Goa in 1999, and the working group meeting on eco-system monitoring and management of CCAMLR in August 1998 at Cochin. India occupied the CCAMLR chair beginning in November 1998 for a period of 2 years.

India also collaborates with the international community as a member of the Intergovernmental Oceanographic Commission, Regional Committee of Intergovernmental Oceanographic Commission in Coastal Indian Ocean (IOCINDIO), International Seabed Authority (ISBA), and the State Parties of the United Nations Convention on the Law of the Seas (UNCLOS).

== Research ==
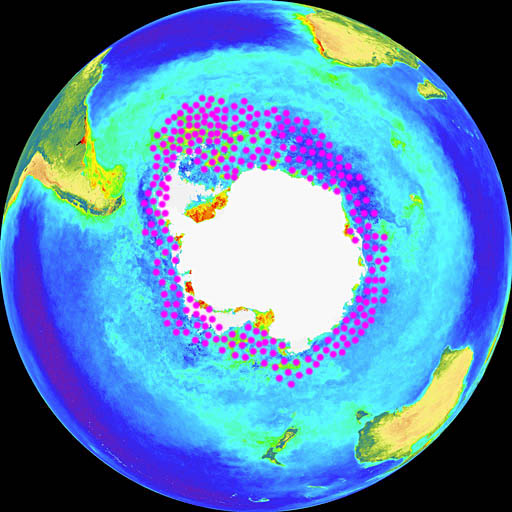
Krill distribution on a NASA SeaWIFS image – the main concentrations are in the Scotia Sea at the Antarctic Peninsula. India carries out krill exploration in the Southern Ocean region of the Antarctic.

Antarctica holds scientific interest for global research projects due to a number of reasons: 'Origin of continents, climate change, meteorology and pollution' are among the reasons cited by S.D. Gad (2008). Mrinalini G. Walawalkar (2005) holds that: 'ice–ocean interaction and the global processes; paleoenvironment and paleoclimatic studies; geological evolution of earth and Gondwanaland reconstruction; Antarctic ecosystems, biodiversity and environment physiology; solar terrestrial processes and their coupling; medical physiology, adaptation techniques and human psychology; environment impact assessment and monitoring; enabling low temperature technology development; and studies on earthquakes' are among the areas of study under the Indian Antarctic Programme.

Close to 1,300 Indians had been to the continent as of 2001 as a part of the country's Antarctic Programme. Indian expeditions to the Antarctic also study the fauna and the molecular biodiversity of the region. A total of 120 new microbes had been discovered as a result of international scientific effort in the Antarctic by 2005. 30 of these microbes had been discovered by Indian scientists. India has also published over 300 research publications based on Antarctic studies as of 2007.

The 'ice cores' retrieved by drilling holes in Antarctic's vast ice-sheets yield information 'on the palaeoclimate and eco-history of the earth as records of wind-blown dust, volcanic ash or radioactivity are preserved in the ice as it gets accumulated over time'. The NCAOR developed a polar research & development laboratory with a 'low-temperature laboratory complex at −20 °C for preservation and analysis of ice core and snow samples' according to S.D. Gad (2008). The 'ice core' samples are held, processed, and analysed in containment units designed by such technology. Storage cases made of poly propylene also ensure that the samples do not alter characteristics and are preserved for analysis in the form that they were recovered.

== Research stations ==
In 1981 the Indian flag unfurled for the first time in Antarctica, marking the start of Southern Ocean expeditions under the environmental protocol of the Antarctic Treaty (1959).

=== Dakshin Gangotri ===
The first permanent settlement was built in 1983 and named Dakshin Gangotri. In 1989 it was excavated and is being used again as supply base and transit camp. Dakshin Gangotri was decommissioned in the year 1990 after half of it got buried under the ice. It is nothing more than a historical site now. In its times, it used to double up as a place for multiple support systems, including the presence of an ice-melting plant, laboratories, storage, accommodation, recreation facilities, a clinic and also a bank counter.

=== Maitri ===
The second permanent settlement, Maitri, was put up in 1989 on the Schirmacher Oasis and has been conducting experiments in geology, geography and medicine. India built this station close to a freshwater lake around Maitri known as Lake Priyadarshini. Maitri accomplished the mission of geomorphologic mapping of Schirmacher Oasis.

=== Bharati ===
Located beside Larsmann Hill at 69°S, 76°E, Bharati is established in March 2012. This newest research station for oceanographic research will collect evidence of continental break-up to reveal the 120-million-year-old ancient history of the Indian subcontinent. In news sources this station was variously spelled "Bharathi", "Bharti" and "Bharati".

=== India Post Office in Antarctica ===
It was established in the year 1984 during the third Indian expedition to Antarctica. It was located at Dakshin Gangotri. As many as 10,000 letters were posted and cancelled in this post office in total in the first year of its establishment. Although the post office is no more there, it is a favourite stopover for Indian tourists who visit the place in cruise ships.

The current Indian post office in Antarctica is situated at Maitri, where the country's current research station is also situated.

== Air Support Operations ==
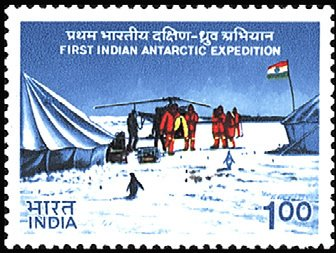
A commemorative postage stamp, 1983

The Indian Air Force has supported logistical operations in Antarctica, including air-dropping critical supplies to research teams in remote camps. In the 1980s and 1990s, IAF’s Helicopters—most notably the Mi-8 played a role in delivering equipment and airdropping scientists and material near Indian research stations. IAF aircrew flying these missions was referred to as "Flyboys in the land of flightless penguins", a nod to the extreme flying conditions and novelty of these high-latitude operations.

== Indian Antarctic expeditions ==
Date	Expedition	Leader	Deputy Leader	Leader (Summer Team)	Deputy Leader (Summer Team)
1981–1982	First Indian Expedition to Antarctica	Dr. Sayed Zahoor Qasim	C. P. Vohra, Dr. B. N. Desai, H. N. Siddiquie		
1982–1983	Second Indian Expedition to Antarctica	V. K. Raina	Dr C. R. Sreedharan		
1983–1985	Third Indian Expedition to Antarctica	Dr Harsh K. Gupta	Lieutenant Colonel Satya Swarup Sharma		
1984	Fourth Indian Expedition to Antarctica	Dr B.B. Bhattacharya	Col. P. Kumaresh		
1985-86	Fifth Indian Expedition to Antarctica	M.K. Kaul	Dr Vinod K Dhargalkar		
1986-87	Sixth Indian Expedition to Antarctica	Dr A M Parulekar	Col. V.S.Iyer (V.S.M)		
1987-1989	Seventh Indian Expedition to Antarctica	Dr R. Sen Gupta	Col P Ganeshan	Dr G. S. Mittal	
1988–1990	Eighth Indian Expedition to Antarctica	Dr Amitava Sen Gupta	Col S Jagannathan	Lt Col J P Khadilkar	
1989–1991	Ninth Indian Expedition to Antarctica	Rasik Ravindra			
1990–1992	Tenth Indian Expedition to Antarctica	Dr A. K. Hanjura			
1991–1993	Eleventh Indian Expedition to Antarctica	Dr Shardendu Mukherjee			
1992-94	Twelfth Indian Expedition to Antarctica	Dr Vinod K Dhargalkar			
1993-95	Thirteenth Indian Expedition to Antarctica	G Sudhakar Rao			
1994-96	Fourteenth Indian Expedition to Antarctica	Dr S D Sharma			
1995-1996	Fifteenth Indian Expedition to Antarctica	Arun Chaturvedi			
1996-98	Sixteenth Indian Expedition to Antarctica	Dr Anand L. Koppar			
1997-99	Seventeenth Indian Expedition to Antarctica	K. R. Shivan			
1998-2000	Eighteenth Indian Expedition to Antarctica	Ajay Dhar			
1999-2001	Nineteenth Indian Expedition to Antarctica	Arun Chaturvedi	M. Javed Beg		
2000-2003	Twentieth Indian Expedition to Antarctica	Marvin D'Souza			
2001–2003	Twenty first Indian Expedition to Antarctica	Ram Prasad Lal			
2002-04	Twenty Second Indian Expedition to Antarctica	Dr Arun Hanchinal			
2003-05	Twenty third Indian Expedition to Antarctica	S. Jayaram			
2004-06	Twenty fourth Indian Expedition to Antarctica	Rajesh Asthana	M. Javed Beg		
2005-2007	Twenty fifth Indian Expedition to Antarctica	L. Prem Kishore			
	Twenty sixth Indian Expedition to Antarctica	Mr Jayapaul D			
	Twenty seventh Indian Expedition to Antarctica	Mr Arun Chaturvedi			
2008–2009	Twenty eighth Indian Expedition to Antarctica	Dr. P. Malhotra	Ajay Dhar		
2009–2010	Twenty ninth Indian Expedition to Antarctica	P. Elango	Rajesh Asthana		
2010–2011	Thirtieth Indian Expedition to Antarctica	K. Jeeva	Rajesh Asthana		
2011–2012	Thirty first Indian Expedition to Antarctica	Dr. Rupesh M. Das (Bharati) & Shree Uttam Chand (Maitri)	Rajesh Asthana		
2013–2014	Thirty third Indian Expedition to Antarctica	Mohd. Yunus Shah (Bharati)	Abhijit Patil (Bharati)		
2014–2015	Thirty fourth Indian Expedition to Antarctica	Kailash Bhindwar (Bharati)	Syed Shadab (Bharati)		
2017–2018	Thirty seven Indian Expedition to Antarctica	Dr. Shailesh Pednekar (Bharati)	Bagati Sudarshan Patro (Bharati)		
2018–2020	38th Indian Expedition to Antarctica	K. Jeeva, Matri- P. Elengo, Bharati			
2019-2020	39th Indian Expedition to Antarctica	Shri Deepak Gajbhiye (Maitri) - Shri Debdip Chakraborty (Bharati) - Dr Shailendra Saini (Voyage Leader)			
2020-2021	40th Indian Expedition to Antarctica	Dr Yogesh Ray (Voyage leader) - Mr Ravindra S. More (Maitri) - Mr Atul Kulkarni (Bharati)			
2021-22	41st Indian Expedition to Antarctica	Mr Huidram Singh (Maitri) - Mr Anoop K Soman (Bharati) - Dr.Shailendra Saini (Voyage Leader)			
2022-23	42nd Indian Expedition to Antarctica	Mr Arun Sable (Maitri) - Mr Pranjal Saikia (Bharati) - Mr Mohammad Sadiq (Voyage Leader)			
