= Maitri (research station) =

- Antarctic Research Station
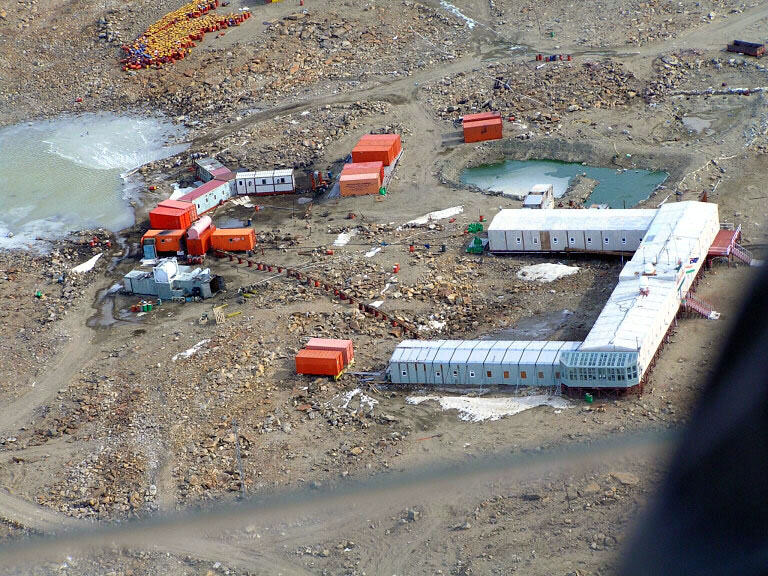
- An aerial view of the Indian Station Maitri, Antarctica on 2 February 2005

- Location of Maitri in Antarctica
- Coordinates: 70°46′00″S 11°43′55″E
- Country: India
- Location in Antarctica: Queen Maud Land; Antarctica
- Administered by: National Centre for Polar and Ocean Research
- Established: January 1989
- Elevation: 117 m (384 ft)

Population (2017)
  - Summer: 45
  - Winter: 25
- UN/LOCODE: AQ MTR
- Type: All-year round
- Period: Annual
- Status: Operational
- Activities: List: Biology; Glaciology; Earth science; Meteorology
- Website: ncpor.res.in

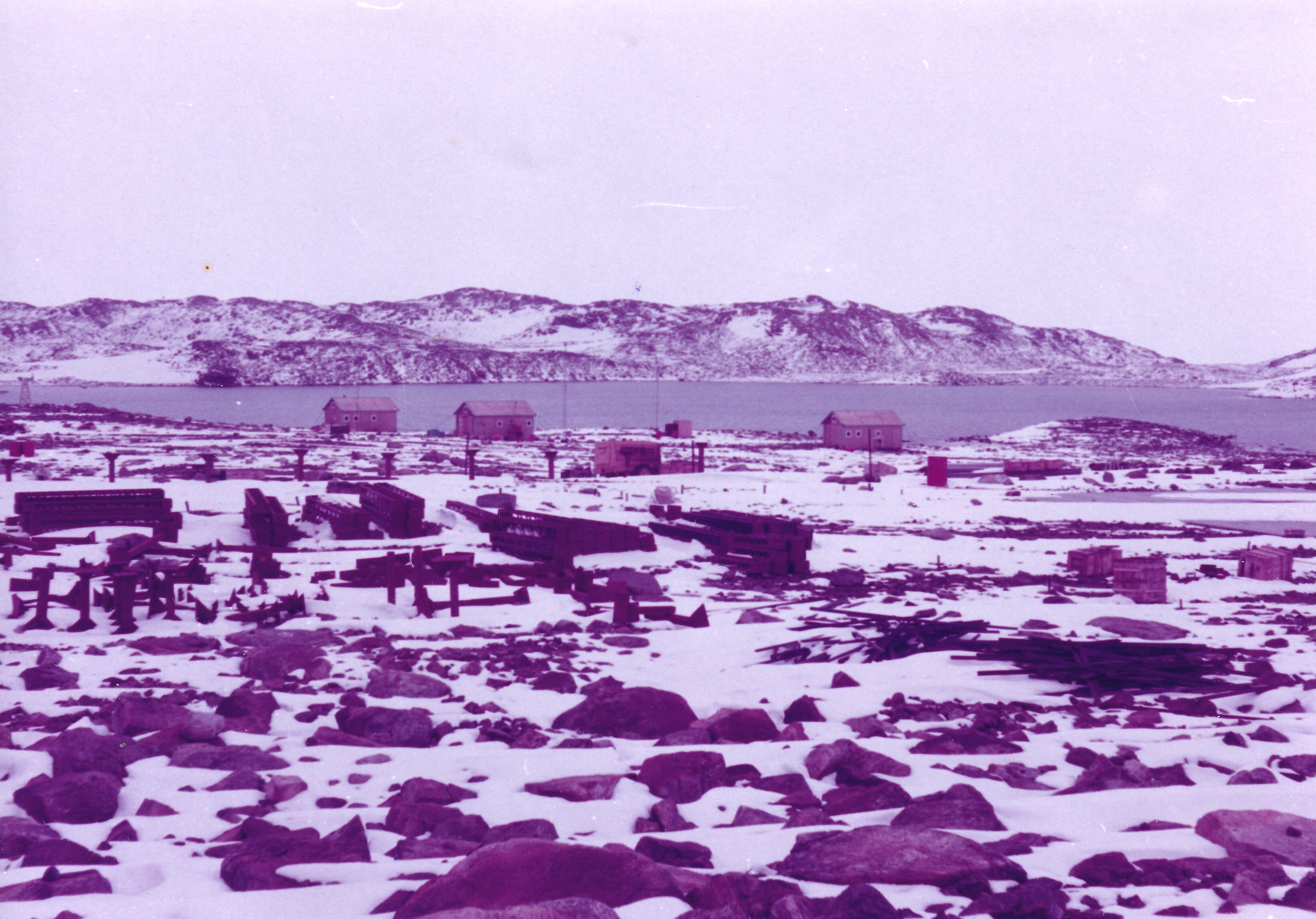
Maitri under construction with lake Indira Priyadarshini in background (1988)

Maitri also known as Friendship Research Centre, is India's second permanent research station in Antarctica as part of the Indian Antarctic Programme. The name was suggested by then-Prime Minister Indira Gandhi. Work on the station was first started by the Indian Antarctic expedition which arrived the end of December 1984, with a team led by Dr. B. B. Bhattacharya. Squadron Leader D. P. Joshi, the surgeon of the team, was the first camp commander of the tentage at camp Maitri. The first huts were started by the IV Antarctica Expedition and completed in 1989, shortly before the first station, Dakshin Gangotri, was buried in ice and abandoned in 1990–91. Maitri is situated in the rocky mountainous region called Schirmacher Oasis. It is only 5 kilometres (3.1 mi) away from the Russian Novolazarevskaya Station.

== Facilities ==
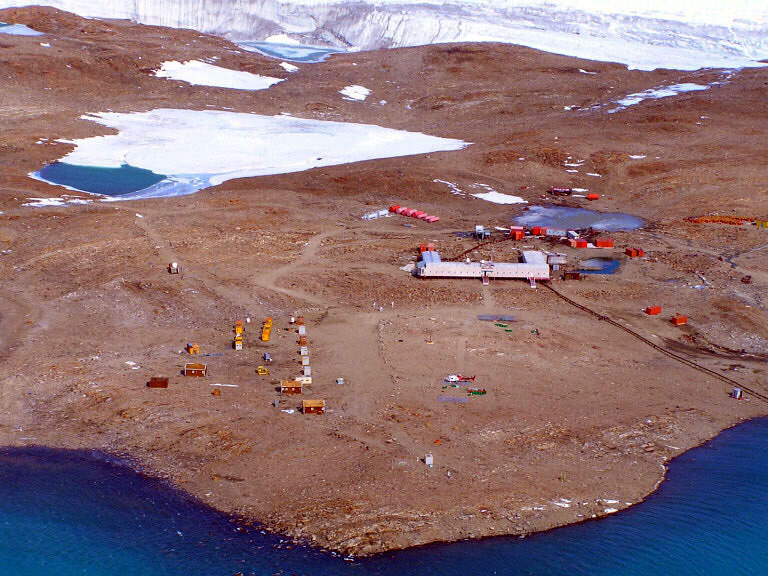
An aerial view of the Indian Station Maitri, Antarctica on 2 February 2005

The station has modern facilities for research in various disciplines, such as biology, earth sciences, glaciology, atmospheric sciences, meteorology, cold region engineering, communication, human physiology, and medicine. It can accommodate 25 people for winter. Fresh water is provided through a freshwater lake named Lake Priyadarshini.

== Airfield ==
ALCI Airbase Novo Runway
- IATA: none; ICAO: none

Summary
- Airport type: Private
- Operator: Antarctic Logistics Centre International (ALCI)
- Serves: Novolazarevskaya and Maitri
- Location: Dronning Maud Land
- Opened: 6 April 2014
- Time zone: (UTC+3.30)
- Coordinates: 70°49′17″S 11°38′36″E

Map
- Location of airfield in Antarctica

Runways
Direction	Length		Surface
Direction	m	ft	Surface
	3,000	9,842	Blue Ice

A blue ice runway, located 10 kilometres (6.2 mi) away, operated by Antarctic Logistics Centre International (ALCI) serves the station and Novolazarevskaya.

== Maitri-II ==
India is planning to replace Maitri research station by a new Maitri-2 station by 2029. Following government approval, India plans for Maitri-II to be operational by January 2032, with a research grant of Rs.1250 crore to design and prepare a DPR.

== See also ==
- Indian Antarctic Program
- Bharati (research station)
- Dakshin Gangotri First Indian station 1983, converted to support base
- Defence Research and Development Organisation
- Defence Institute of High Altitude Research
- Indian Astronomical Observatory
- Jantar Mantar, Jaipur
- National Centre for Polar and Ocean Research
- Siachen Base Camp (India)
- List of Antarctic research stations
- List of Antarctic field camps
- List of highest astronomical observatories
