= Dakshin Gangotri =

Indian Antarctic research station

Dakshin Gangotri Station
- Antarctic research station
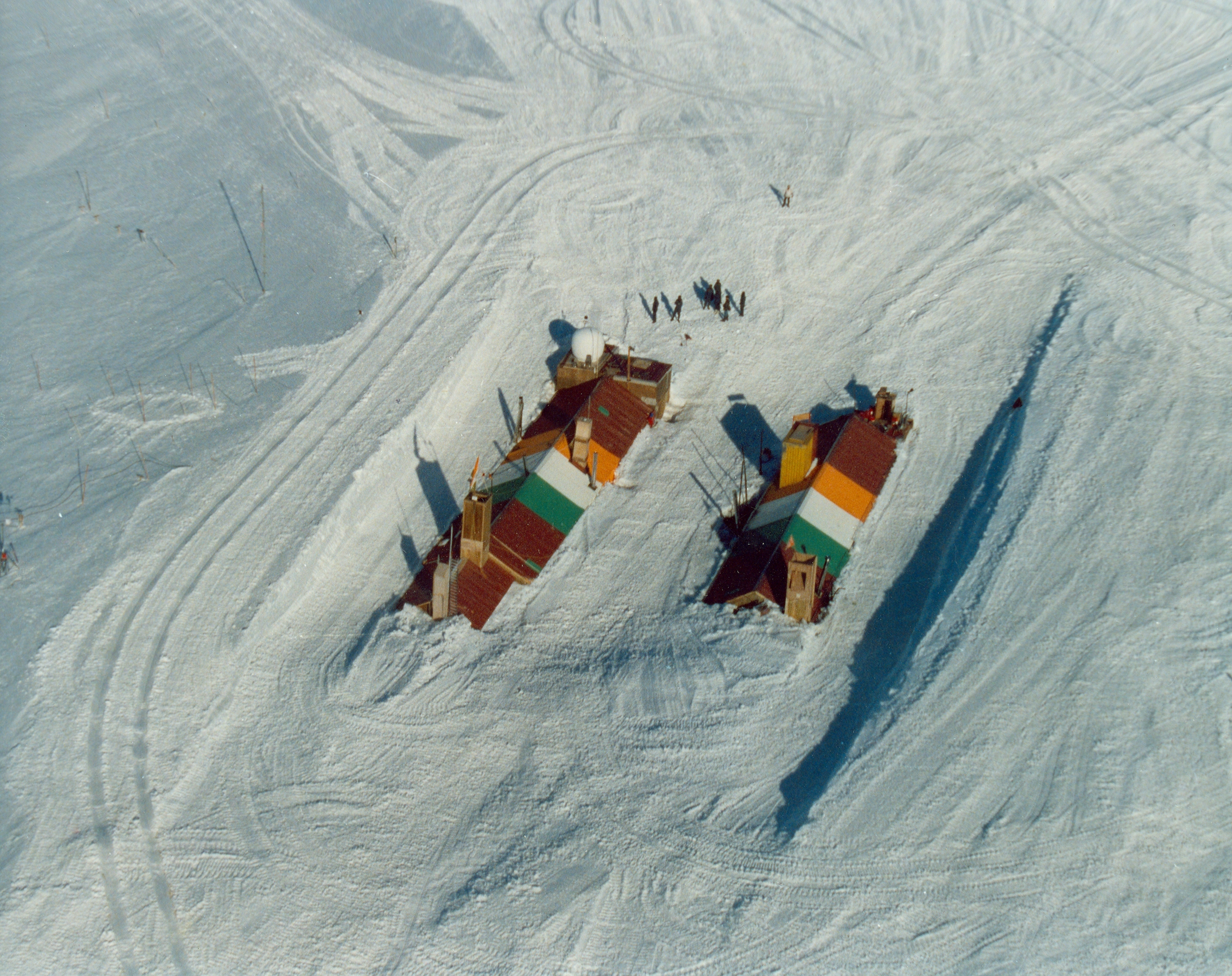
- Aerial view of the station

- Location in Antarctica
- Coordinates: 70°04′27″S 12°00′12″E
- Region: Queen Maud Land
- Location: Near Dakshin Gangotri Glacier
- Established: 26 January 1984
- Abandoned: 25 February 1990
- Named for: Gangotri Glacier

Government
  - Type: Administration
  - Body: NCPOR, India
- Active times: All year-round
- Website: ncpor.res.in

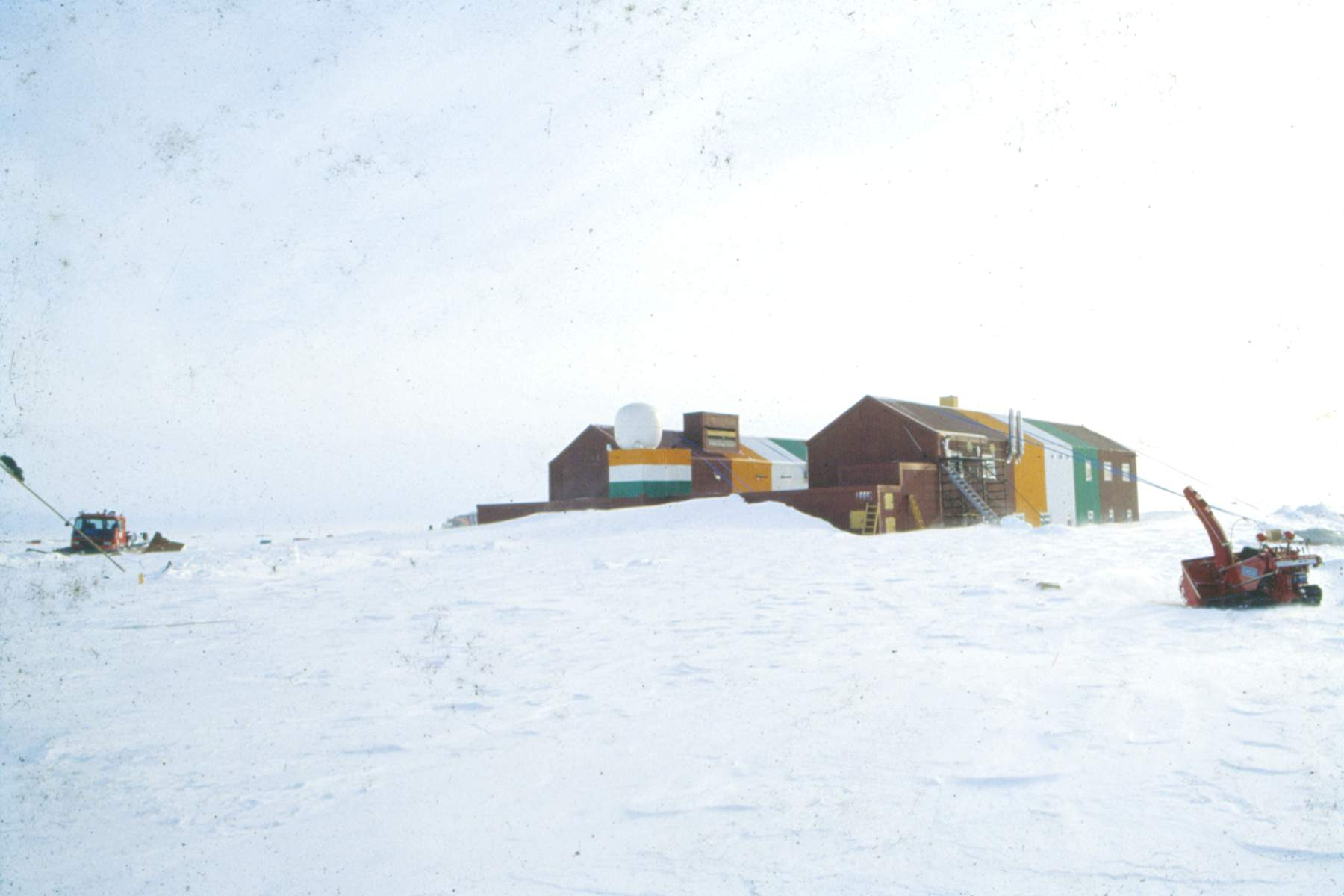
Dakshin Gangotri station

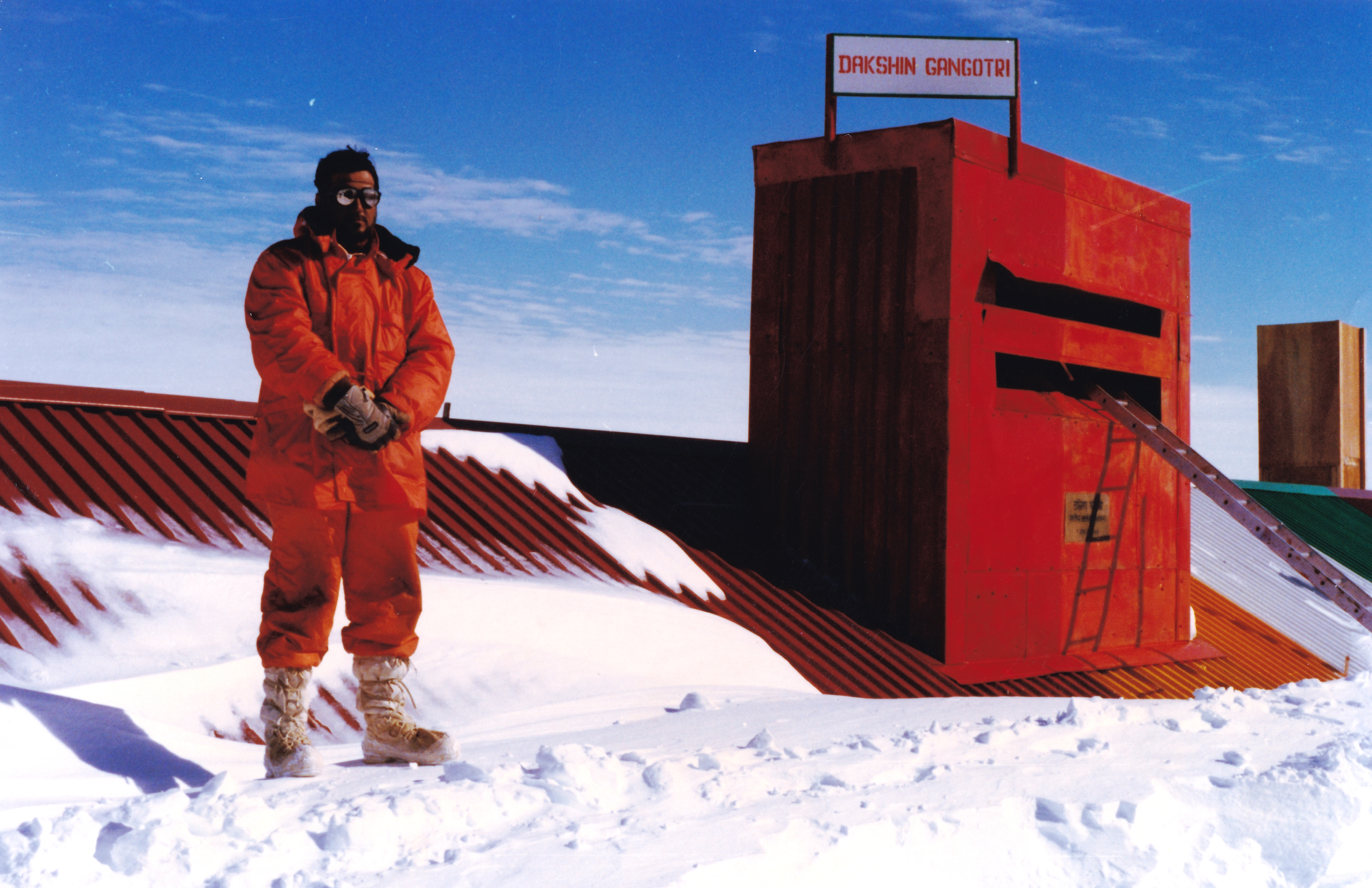
A member of 7th Indian Antarctic Expedition Team at Dakshin Gangotri. (26 January 1988)

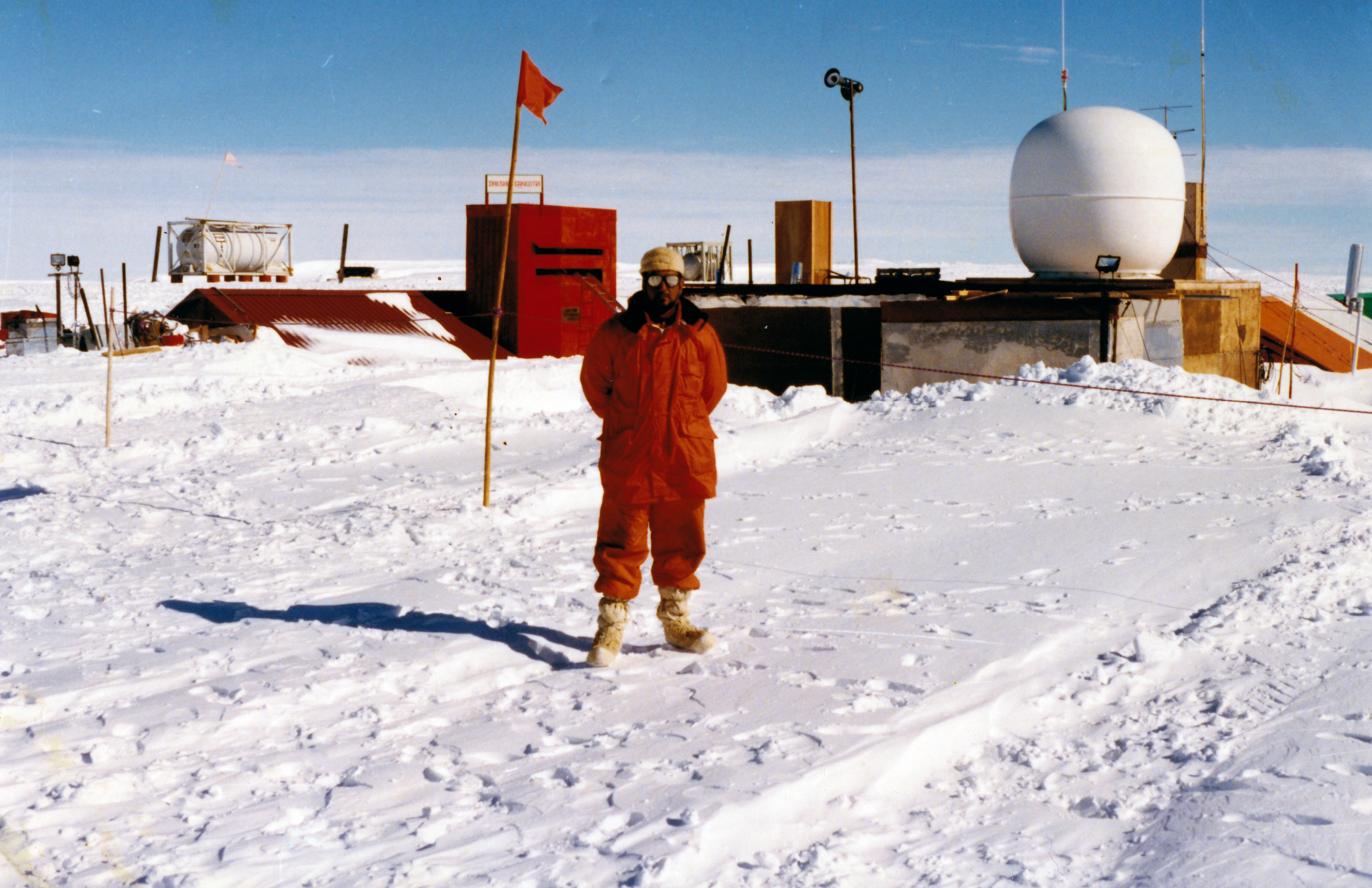
A member of 7th Indian Antarctic Expedition Team at Dakshin Gangotri. (26 January 1988)

Dakshin Gangotri was the first scientific base station of India situated in Antarctica, part of the Indian Antarctic Programme. It is located at a distance of 2,500 kilometres (1,600 mi) from the South Pole. It is currently being used as a supply base and transit camp. The base is named after Dakshin Gangotri Glacier.

It was established during the third Indian expedition to Antarctica in 1983–84. This was the first time an Indian team spent a winter in Antarctica to carry out scientific works. The station was built in eight weeks by an 81-member team that included geologist Sudipta Sengupta. Construction was completed late into January 1984 with help from the Indian army and Indian Republic Day was celebrated at the station along with the Soviets and East Germans.

== Description ==
It was an unmanned station, set up using indigenous Indian equipment, powered by solar energy. The station was entirely computerised to record all data that was researched. It was built using pre-fabricated timber, and was intended as a permanent station. It had an Inmarsat communication terminal, as well as an amateur radio station.

The station was divided into two sections, Blocks A and B. Block A contained generators, fuel supply and workshops while Block B was home to laboratories, radio rooms and other facilities.

An automatic weather recording station, powered by solar energy was set up at the Dakshin Gangotri. Apart from this, the station was used to conduct tests on radio waves in Antarctica. Other functions of the Dakshin Gangotri included observations of physical oceanography, the chemistry of the freshwater lakes around, biological traits of the land, biological traits of the water, geology, glaciology and geomagnetism of the area.

In 1984, site for a new runway was identified at a distance of 2 km from the station. Along with this, 2000 philatelic covers were marked with Dakshin Gangotri. Later, in the same year, a small field station was set up in the hills, to allow direct communication over a high frequency satellite link between Indian mainland and the station.

In 1985, instruments such as the Automatic Picture Transmission Receiver, and the Radio Metre Sonde were set up to calculate wind velocities and solar intensities to determine the feasibility of generation of wind energy and solar energy. 2000 philatelic covers were cancelled, while videos were taken on the station. An electrified garage to store snow vehicles and skidoos was constructed as well as a repair workshop for them was constructed along with three cottages made with pre-fabricated material, built by the Defence Research and Development Organisation.The Indian Navy helped set up the communications system for wireless transmission to India.

In 1984, The first Indian post office in Antarctica was established at Dakshin Gangotri and Meteorologist G. Sudhakar Rao was named as the first Indian postmaster in Antarctica in 1988.

== Conversion to supply base and replacement ==
It was abandoned in 1988–1989 after it was submerged in ice. It was succeeded by the Maitri research station, which was set up in a moderate climatic zone at a distance of 90 km and made operational in 1990. Dakshin Gangotri was finally decommissioned on 25 February 1990 and subsequently turned into a supply base.

In 1991, the eleventh Indian Scientific Expedition to Antarctica conducted geomagnetic observations simultaneously at Dakshin Gangotri and Maitri.

In 2008, India set up its first permanent research base on the Arctic Ocean, Himadri.

In 2012, a third research station, the Bharati was made operational, although only for testing.

In 2014, the second Arctic research station, a moored observatory named IndARC was commissioned.

== See also ==
- Indian Antarctic Program
- Bharati (research station)
- Maitri Second Indian station 1989
- Defence Research and Development Organisation
- Defence Institute of High Altitude Research
- Indian Astronomical Observatory
- Jantar Mantar, Jaipur
- National Centre for Polar and Ocean Research
- Siachen Base Camp (India)
- List of Antarctic research stations
- List of Antarctic field camps
- List of highest astronomical observatories
