= Defence Institute of High Altitude Research =

Indian defence laboratory

- Established: 1962
- Director: Dr Om Prakash Chaurasia
- Location: Leh, Ladakh, India; 34.138215°N 77.572682°E
- Operating agency: DRDO
- Website: https://www.drdo.gov.in/labs-and-establishments/defence-institute-high-altitude-research-dihar

The Defence Institute of High Altitude Research (DIHAR) is a defence laboratory of the Defence Research and Development Organisation (DRDO) located in Leh city of Ladakh in India. It conducts research on cold arid agro-animal technologies.

The present director of DIHAR is Dr. Om Prakash Chaurasia.

== History ==
In 2014, the Defence Institute of High Altitude Research (DIHAR) successfully cross-bred and produced the hybrid Zanskar ponies, which can carry an increased weight load for the Indian Army's requirements.

In 2015, DIHAR established an Extreme Altitude Research Centre in Chang La, Jammu and Kashmir, at a height of 17,600 ft above mean sea level, making it the world’s highest terrestrial research and development centre.

In 2020, with an intent to make the DRDO leaner and more effective, it was proposed to merge the Defence Institute of Bio-Energy Research (DIBER), DIHAR, and Defence Research Laboratory (DRL). The collaboration with the Defence Food Research Laboratory and the Central Food Technological Research Institute of the Council of Scientific and Industrial Research (CSIR) will be enhanced. Also in 2020, DIHAR developed a microgreens cultivation technology for India's patrol posts and bunkers along the Saichen Glacier.

Since 2024, DIHAR has been developing a solar thermal warming technology, which is named as "Solar Thermal Energy Based Technology for Space Heating (Human Habitation) In High Altitude", for warming the shelters for soldiers during Ladakh's winters.

== See also ==
Research

- Siachen Base Camp (India)
- List of Antarctic research stations
- List of Antarctic field camps
- List of highest astronomical observatories

Borders

- Actual Ground Position Line (AGPL), India-Pakistan border across Siachen region
- Line of Actual Control (LAC), India-China border across Ladakh
- Line of Control (LoC), India-Pakistan border across Ladakh and Jammu and Kashmir

Conflicts

- Sino-Indian War
- Indo-Pakistani wars and conflicts
- Siachen conflict
- Siachen Glacier

Tourism and infrastructure

- India-China Border Roads
- Siachen Base Camp (India)
- Tourism in Ladakh

Geography

- Geology of the Himalaya
- Indus-Yarlung suture zone
- List of districts of Ladakh
