= Dhalan =

- Village
- Location in Jammu and Kashmir, India Dhalan (India)
- Coordinates: 32.7821218°N 74.4578983°E
- Country: India
- Union Territory: Jammu and Kashmir
- District: Jammu

Population (2011)
  - Total: 643

Languages
  - Spoken: Dogri, Hindi
- Time zone: UTC+5:30 (IST)

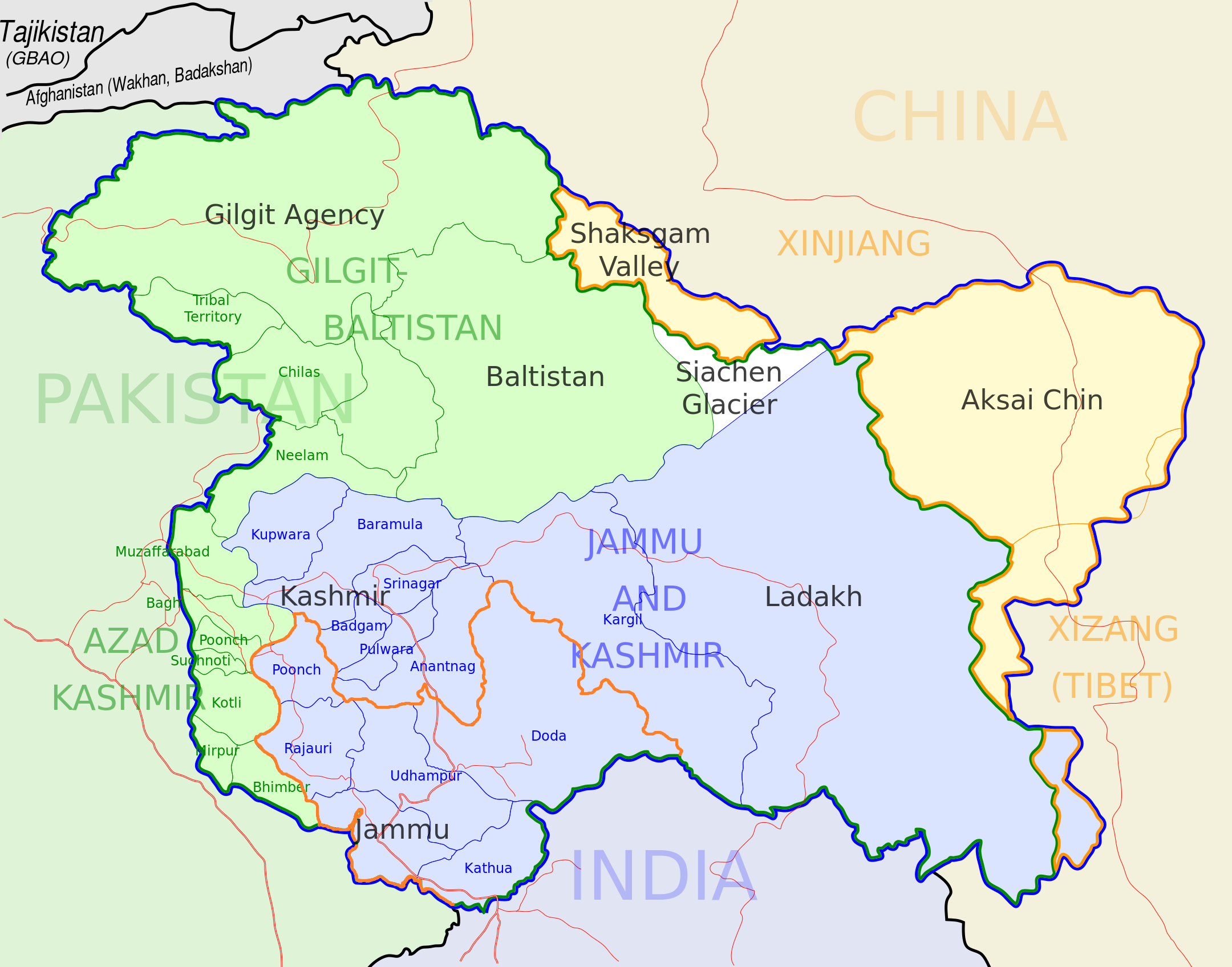
The line separating the Indian-administered (blue) and Pakistan-administered (dark green) parts of Kashmir is called the Line of Control (LoC). It begins at Dhalan west of Jammu and ends at the Point NJ9842 at extreme southwest corner of Siachen. The Actual Ground Position Line (AGPL) separates areas held by India and Pakistan in the disputed Siachen region.

Dhalan is a village located on a river bank in Jammu district of Jammu and Kashmir union territory of India. Dhalan is located on the India-Pakistan LoC, which begins just north of Dahlan. The important geostrategic Chicken's Neck military sector of Pakistan lies southeast of Dhalan.

Dhalan is 36 km from nearest railway station at Akhnoor on the Jammu–Poonch line and 68 km from the nearest airport Jammu Airport.

== Etymology ==
Dhalan means the slope.

== History ==
On 30 September 2018, A Pakistani civilian helicopter carrying Pakistani politician Farooq Haider Khan intruded in the Indian airspace in the Gulpur-Dhalan sector, which retracted to Pakistani airspace after warning shots were fired by the Indian forces.

== Demography ==
According to the 2011 census of India, Dhalan had a population of 158 households with a population of 643 people including 341 male and 302 female and an area of 66.7 ha all of which is irrigable.

== LoC begins from Dahlan ==
The actual India-Pakistan boundary is divided into four types of borders: disputed Sir Creek riverine border, mutually agreed India–Pakistan International Border (IB) from north of Sir Creek to north of Dhalan near Jammu, LoC across disputed Kashmir and Ladakh regions from north of Dhalan in India and west of Chicken's Neck in Pakistan to Point NJ9842, and Actual Ground Position Line (AGPL) across Siachen from Point NJ9842 to Indira Col West. Siachen lies west of the Shaksgam ceded by Pakistan to China via the 1963 Sino-Pakistan Agreement but also claimed by India and Aksai Chin held by China since 1962 but also claimed by India. The Shaksgam Tract controlled by China is located north of the Saltoro mountain range from K12 to the Teram Shehr plateau.

One of the main thrusts of Operation Grand Slam in the Indo-Pakistani War of 1965 was to capture Akhnoor through the Chicken's Neck, which could potentially have choked the Indian Army in the region; however, the plan failed.

== See also ==
- Indo-Pakistani wars and conflicts
