= NJ9842 =

Point of military importance in Kashmir

Coordinates: 35.008371°N 77.008805°E

NJ9842

NJ9842, also called NJ 980420 (in full: NJ 38 98000, 13 42000, yard based Indian Grid Coordinates), (Note: NJ refers to the Survey of India sheet that covers the region. The first two digits "38" and "13" are inferred from the sheet, and the remaining digits delineate the precise location.) is the northernmost demarcated point of the India-Pakistan cease fire line in Kashmir known as the Line of Control (LoC). The India–Pakistan AGPL (Actual Ground Position Line), begins from the NJ9842 on LoC and ends near the Indira Ridge at the trijunction of areas controlled by China, India, and Pakistan.

== Delineation ==
As part of the Simla Agreement signed on 2 July 1972, prime ministers Indira Gandhi and Zulfikar Ali Bhutto agreed that "the line of control resulting from the ceasefire of 17 December 1971, shall be respected by both sides without prejudice to the recognised position of either side".

In November–December 1972, the military delegations of the two sides met in Suchetgarh to delineate the Line of Control. After delineation, signed maps were exchanged by the two sides and submitted to the respective governments for ratification. Scholar Brian Cloughley remarked that the delineation represented remarkable territorial precision. However, it terminated at the grid reference NJ9842, leaving undelimited roughly 60 to 75 km to the border with China.

== Location ==
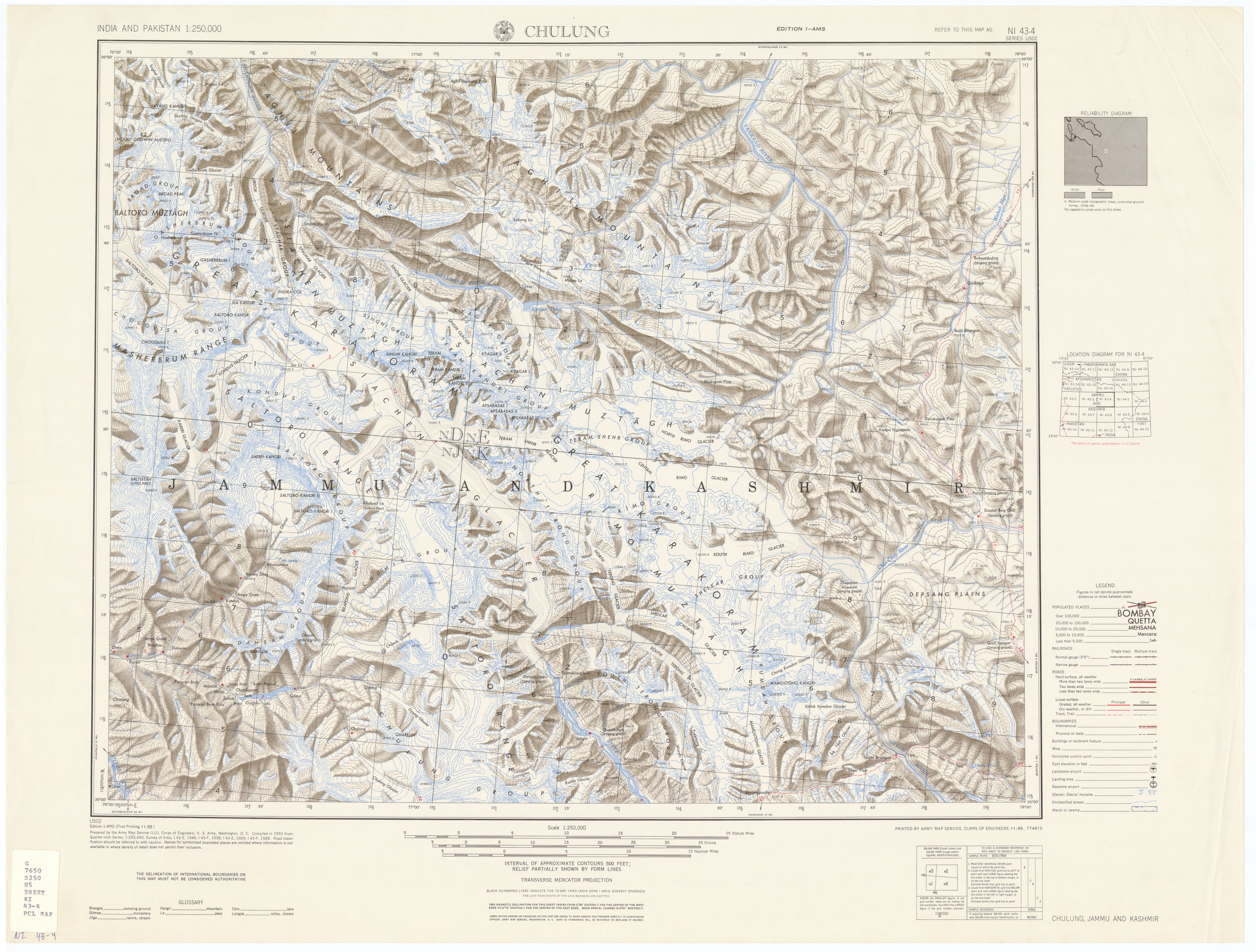
1954 US Army map of the area; The grid 38 90000, 13 40000 is the fifth square in the bottom row.

The point NJ9842 is on the Saltoro Mountain Range, at the top of the Chalunka Lungpa valley that runs north from the village of Chalunka. The immediate south of the point is occupied by the Korisa Glacier, the source of the Chalunka Lungpa stream which flows into the Shyok River. To the southeast of NJ9842 is the Urdolep or Waris Glacier, which forms the source of the Waris Lungpa stream.

To the north of the point are the Chulung Glacier, which is the source of the Dansam River (one of the feeder rivers of the Saltoro River), and the Gyong Glacier, which generates a tributary stream called Gyong, all in Pakistan-administered Kashmir.

The prevailing line of control, called the Actual Ground Position Line, runs northeast from NJ9842 for about 10 km, approximately along the water-parting line of the two sets of glaciers. Afterwards, it runs north roughly along the watershed line of the Saltoro ridge, which divides the waters of the tributaries of the Shyok River that flow into Pakistan-administered Kashmir from those that flow into the Nubra River and tributaries in Indian-administered Kashmir.

Even though several authors identify the point Khor of the 1949 cease-fire line with NJ9842, the two points are quite different. Khor is further south, in the grid 39 00000, 13 20000 of Indian grid coordinates, closer to the Shyok River valley. The move up from Khor to NJ9842 in 1972 represented in part the territory gained by India in the Indo-Pakistani War of 1971. (Note: The villages of Chalunka, Turtuk, Tyakshi and Dhothang in the Chorbat Valley.)

=== AGPL ===
AGPL runs along the Saltoro Mountains Range from Point NJ9842 on the India-Pakistan LoC to near La Yongma Ri, Gyong La, Gyong Kangri, Chumik Kangri, Bilafond La (pass) and nearby Bana Post, Saltoro Kangri, Ghent Kangri, and Sia La to the India–Pakistan–China trijunction northwest of Indira Col West on the Sino-Indian LAC. The peaks and passes under Pakistan's control such as Gayari Camp, Chogolisa, Baltoro Glacier, Conway Saddle, Baltoro Muztagh, and Gasherbrum lie west of the AGPL.

== See also ==
Near the AGPL (Actual Ground Position Line)

- NJ9842 (peak) LoC ends and AGPL begins here
- Gharkun (peak)
- Gyong Kangri (peak)
- Gyong La (pass)
- Goma (Siachen)
- Gyari (valley)
- Chumik Kangri (peak)
- K12 (mountain) (peak)
- Bana Top (peak)
- Bilafond La
- Saltoro Valley
- Ghent Kangri
- Sia La
- Sia Kangri
- Indira Col

Borders

- Actual Ground Position Line (AGPL)
- India–Pakistan International Border IIB)
- Line of Control (LoC)
- Line of Actual Control (LAC)
- Sir Creek (SC)
- Borders of China
- Borders of India
- Borders of Pakistan

Conflicts

- Kashmir conflict
- Siachen conflict
- Sino-Indian conflict
- List of disputed territories of China
- List of disputed territories of India
- List of disputed territories of Pakistan
- Northern Areas
- Trans-Karakoram Tract

Operations

- Operation Meghdoot, by India
- Operation Rajiv, by India
- Operation Ababeel, by Pakistan

Books

- Beyond NJ 9842: The Siachen Saga
- Meghdoot : The Beginning of the Coldest War

Other related topics

- Awards and decorations of the Indian Armed Forces
- Bana Singh, after whom Quaid Post was renamed to Bana Top
- Sino-Pakistan Agreement for transfer of Trans-Karakoram Tract to China
