= Actual Ground Position Line =

Physical India–Pakistan boundary in Kashmir

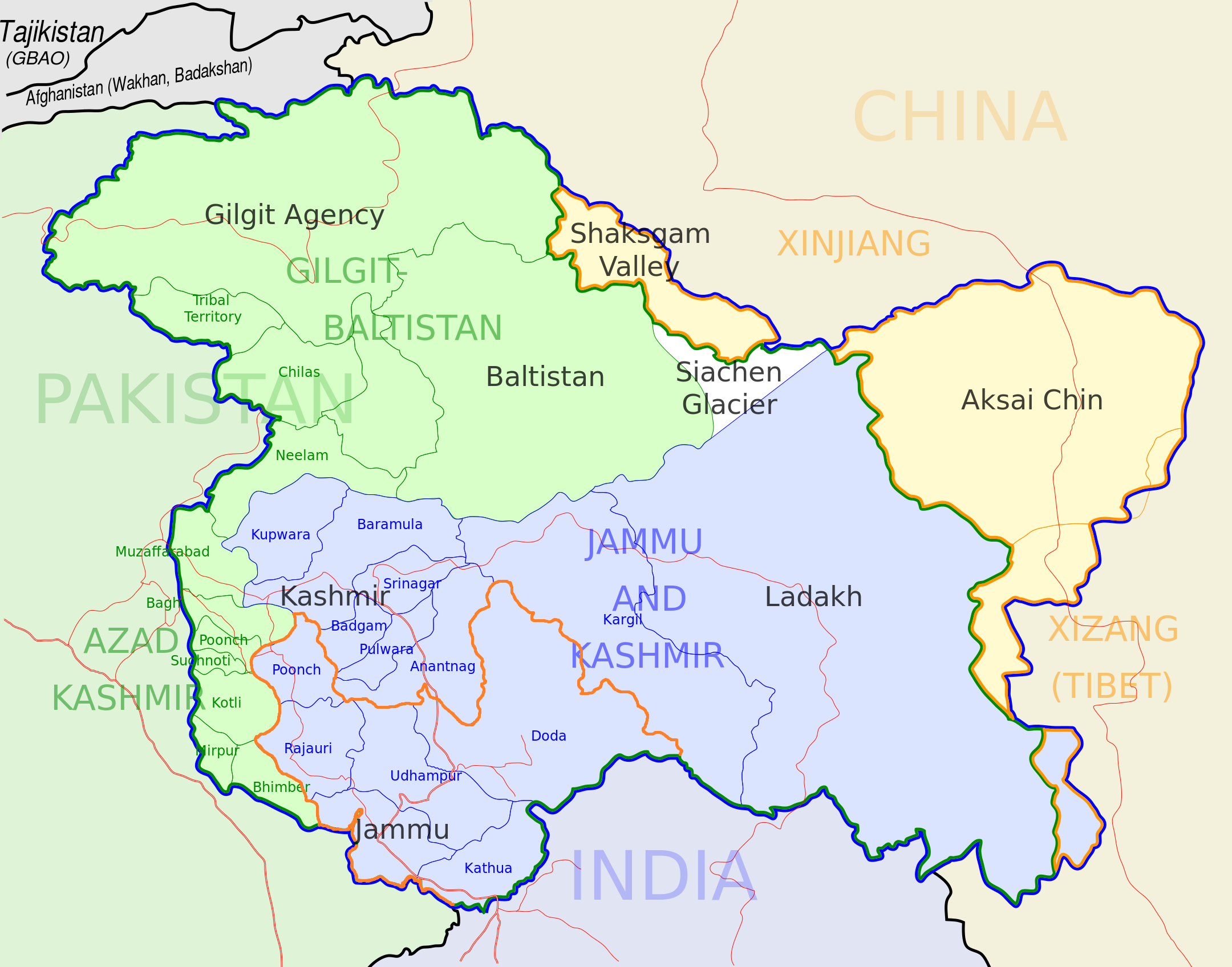
UN map showing Siachen in white. Line between the green and white area is the "Actual Ground Position Line" (AGPL). The white area east of the AGPL is held by India.

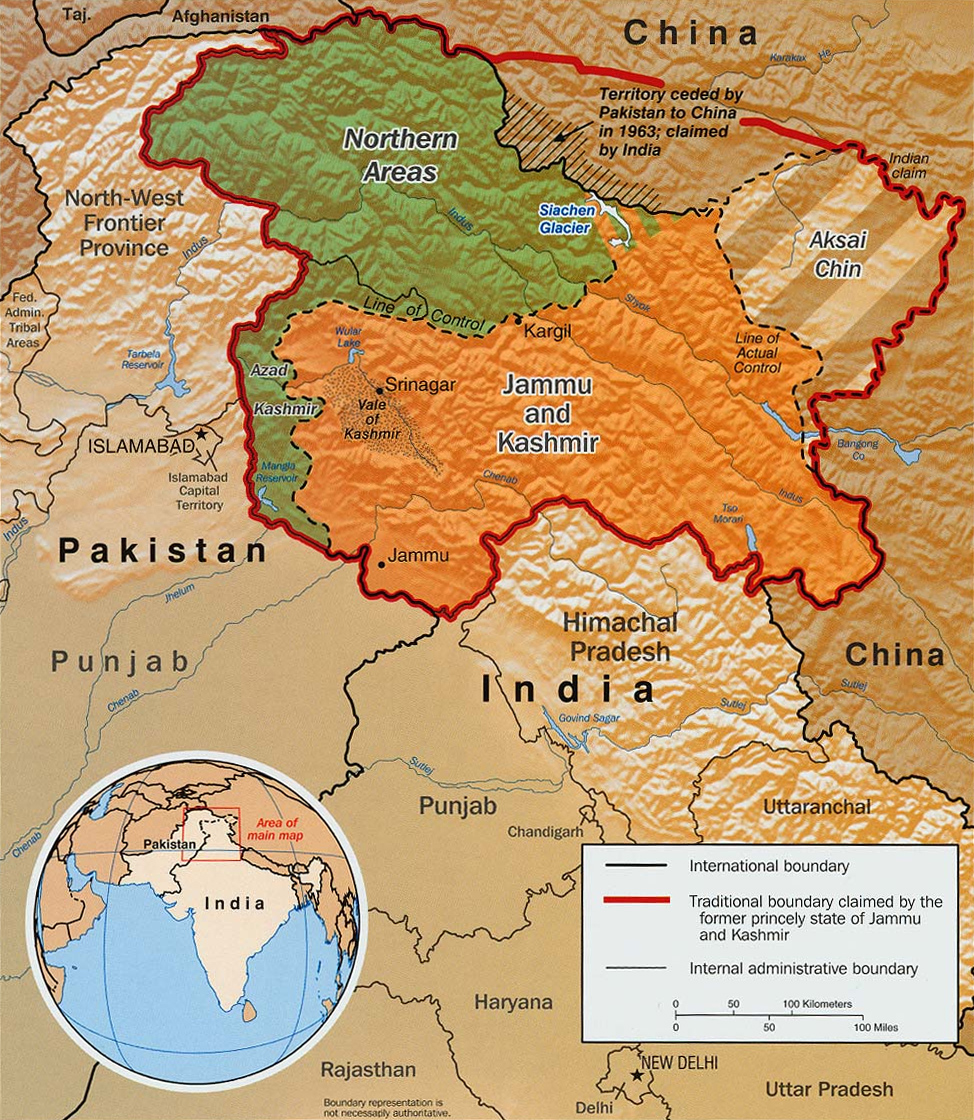
Indo-Pak mutually-agreed undisputed "International Border" (IB) in the black line, Indo-Pak "Line of Control" (LoC) in black dotted line in the north and west, Indo-Sino "Line of Actual" (LAC) in black dotted line in the east, Indo-Pak line across Siachen in north is "Actual Ground Position Line" (AGPL). The areas shown in green are the two Pakistani-controlled areas: Gilgit–Baltistan in the north and Azad Kashmir in the south. The area shown in orange is the Indian-controlled territories of Jammu and Kashmir, and Ladakh, and the diagonally-hatched area to the east is the Chinese-controlled area known as Aksai Chin. "Territories ceded by Pakistan to China claimed by India" in the north is Shaksgam (Trans-Karakoram Tract).

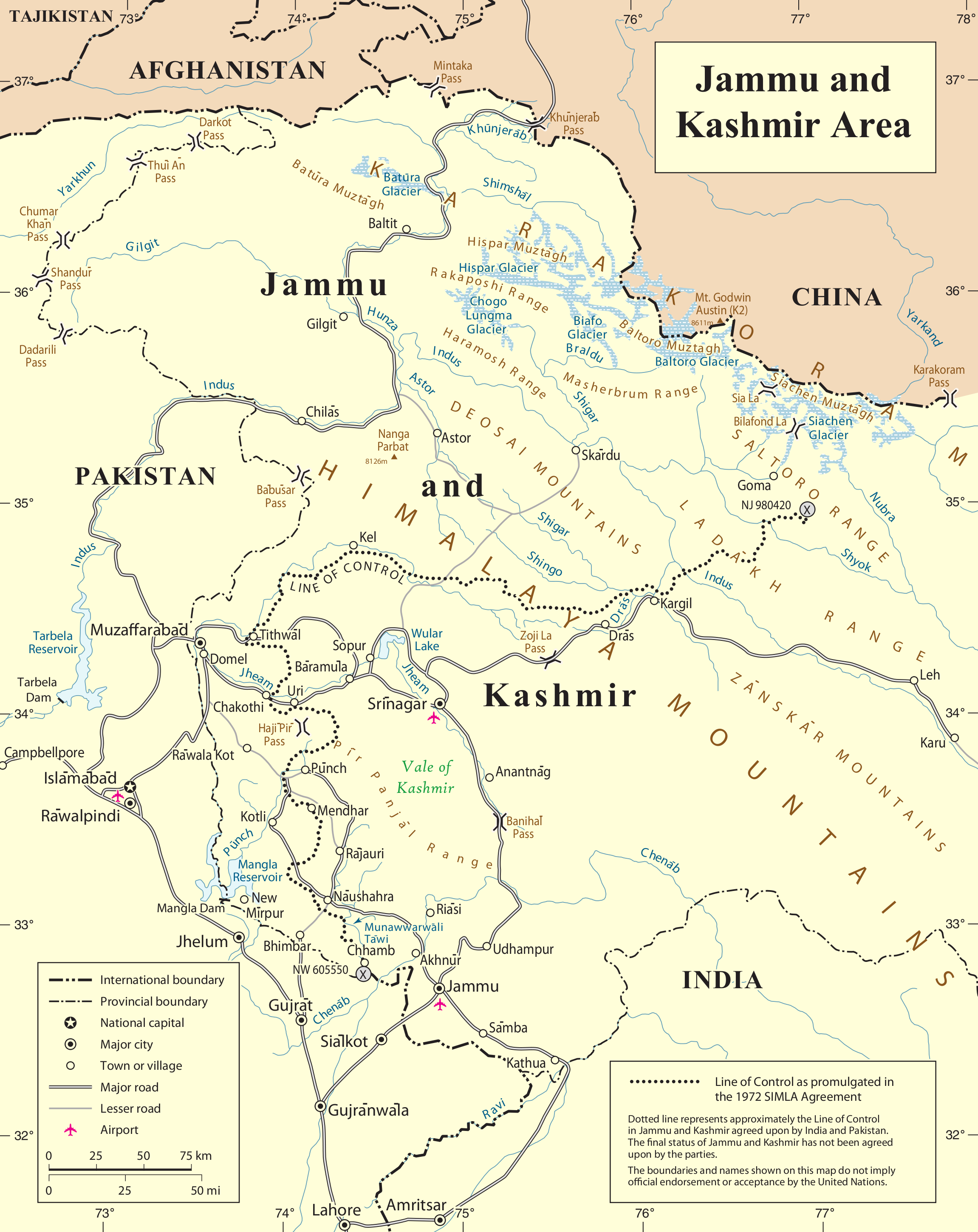
UN map of the Line of Control, which ends at "Point NJ980420" (Point NJ9842). The "Actual Ground Position Line" (AGPL) of the Siachen Glacier begins here. Nubra River valley and Siachen glaciers held by India, along with Bilafond La and Sia La. The Masherbrum Range, Baltoro Glacier, Baltoro Glacier, Baltoro Muztagh and K2 are held by Pakistan.

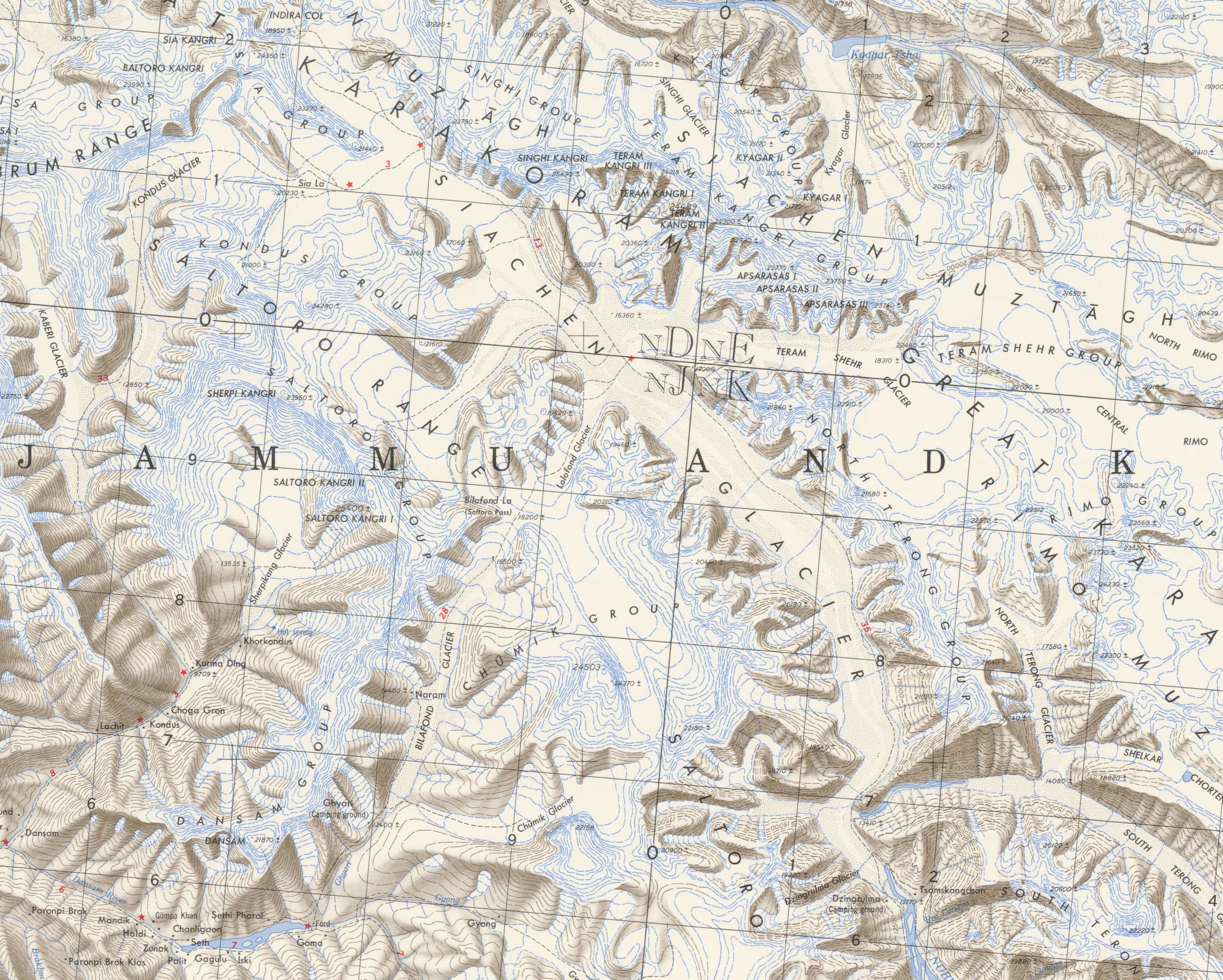
Features in the Siachen area.

The Actual Ground Position Line (AGPL) divides current positions of Indian and Pakistani military posts and troops along the entire 110 kilometres (68 mi) long frontline in the disputed region of Siachen Glacier. AGPL generally runs along the Saltoro Mountains range, beginning from the northernmost point of the (LOC) at Point NJ 9842 and ending in the north on the Indira Ridge at the India-China-Pakistan LAC tripoint near Sia Kangri about 4 km (2.5 mi) northwest of Indira Col West, with peaks in excess of 7,000 m (23,000 ft) and temperatures ranging to around −55 °C (−67 °F). India gained control of 1,000 square miles (2,600 km^{2}) of disputed territory in 1984 because of its military operations in Siachen. A cease-fire was announced in 2003.

India has at least 108 forward military outposts and artillery observation posts in this area where temperature goes down to −55 °C (−67 °F) during winters with icy 100 km/h (62 mph) blizzards.Bana Top (6,200 metres (20,500 ft)) is the highest post and requires an 80-kilometre (50 mi) trek that takes up to 20 days for troops to reach. Pahalwan Post (6,100 metres (20,000 ft)), and Indira Col (5,800 metres (19,000 ft)), are other high posts. India has two major bases, each with a brigade strength of five to eight battalions supported by additional artillery, air defence, engineer and other logistic units: Thoise which serves the southern Siachen sector, and Siachen Base Camp which serves the northern and middle sectors of Siachen. Kumar Post, a logistics subbase of Siachen Base Camp, is a 60-kilometre (37 mi) 9-day return trek from Siachen Base camp towards Indira Col. India has significant tactical advantage as it occupies most of the higher peaks on the Saltoro Mountain Range in the western sector of Siachen. The Pakistani Army hold posts at lower heights on the western slopes of the spurs of the Saltoro Ridge. Pakistan has not been able to scale the crest of the Saltoro Range occupied by India. Each post has an artillery officer who are deployed in the rotation of 45 days. The average temperature is between minus 25 °C during day and minus 55 °C during the night. As of 2013, Siachen operations cost INR 3,000 crore annually where over 850 Indian and over 1,800 Pakistani soldiers have died, mostly not in combat, but due to the weather conditions.

The actual India-Pakistan boundary is divided into four types of borders: disputed Sir Creek (SC) riverine border, mutually agreed India–Pakistan International Border (IB) from north of Sir Creek to north of Dhalan near Jammu, LoC across disputed Kashmir and Ladakh regions from north of Dhalan in India and west of Chicken's Neck in Pakistan to Point NJ9842, and Actual Ground Position Line (AGPL) across Siachen from Point NJ9842 to Indira Col West. Siachen lies south of the Shaksgam ceded by Pakistan to China via the 1963 Sino-Pakistan Agreement but also claimed by India and Aksai Chin held by China since 1962 but also claimed by India. The Shaksgam Tract, controlled by China, is located north of the Saltoro mountain range from the Apsarasas Kangri Range to 90 km (56 mi) northwest of K2.

== AGPL details ==
=== AGPL alignment ===
AGPL alignment, from south to north, runs near the following features of the Saltoro Mountains subrange of Karakoram: AGPL runs through the western side of the Saltoro Mountains Range, of which western slopes are held by Pakistan and separated by the AGPL the higher peaks and passes are held by India - all of which remain snowbound throughout the year. Five passes in the Saltoro Mountains Range provide access to Siachen Glacier to its east, i.e., listed from south to north are Chulung La (5,800m), Yarma La (6,100m), Gyong La (5,640m), Bilafond La (6,160m) - also called Saltoro La, and Sia La (7,300m). To the east of AGPL is Siachen Glacier which falls from the height of 18000 ft at Indira Kol to nearly 11000 ft at its terminus near India's Siachen Base Camp. India and Pakistan have nearly 150 military posts in Siachen along AGPL with nearly 3,000 soldiers each. Nearest road is to the Indian Military Base Camp at Dzingrulma, with 5G mobile and internet connectivity, which is 72 km from the beginning of the Siachen glacier at Indira Col. Nearest civilian village is Warshi in India, 16 km (10 miles) downstream from the Indian base camp on the Dzingrulma-Khalsar Road.

Subsectors of SGPL, so named by the Indian Army, are listed below.

==== Southern Saltoro Ridge subsector ====
Southern Sector, so named by the Indian Army, is approached by via the Nubra Valley.

- AGPL Starting Point is NJ9842 peak (?); the Line of Control ends and the AGPL begins here and runs northwards.
- Chulung Glacier, AGPL runs east of this Pakistan-held glacier while the higher peaks around the Chulung Glacier including Bahadur Post are held by India.
- Chulung La (5,800m), held by India.
- Chulung Peak (also called the Bahadur Post) (6,100 m or 20,000 feet), held by India.
- Gharkun peak (6620 m), AGPL runs southeast of this Pakistan-held peak.
- La Yongma Ri (6828 m), AGPL runs west of this India-held glacier.
- Yarma La (6,100m) near La Yongma Ri glacier, both held by India.
- Northeast of Pakistan-held Gyong Glacier.
- 5770 (Naveed Top/Cheema Top/Bilal Top), held by India.
- Gyong Kangri peak (6,965 m), lies near Gyong La pass at the southern end of the Saltoro Ridge, it guards the approach to the Siachen Glacier from the south, held by India.
- Gyong La pass (5,640m), held by India.</ref name=saw1>

==== Central Saltoro Ridge subsector ====
- East of Gyari (valley) Pakistani army base camp.
- Chumik Kangri (peak, 675 4m), overlooks Chumik Glacier sector, held by India.
- K12 (peak, 7,428 m), held by India (east face) and Pakistan (west face).
- West of Bilafond La (6,160m), held by India.
- West of Bana Top peak (6,400m or 22,143 ft), formerly Quaid Post of Pakistan, the highest post in the region at 20,500 ft two km south of Bilafond La, held by India since 1987 after the Operation Rajiv. In the same Bilafond La sector, also lie the India-held Sonam post (21,000 ft or 6,400 m elevation between Bana and Amar posts is slightly northwest of Bana Post, was established by Havildar Sonam in 1984, has world's highest helipad), and India-held Amar Post (south of Bana and Sonam Post on the slopes of the Saltoro Ridge at a higher elevation than Sonam Post but lower than Bana Post).
- Saltoro Kangri I (7,742 m or 25,400 ft), 10 km northwest of Bana Top, twin peaks of Saltoro Kangri I to south and Saltoro Kangri II at a lower height to the north. It is the highest peak in the Siachen sector, India controls the area around the peak but Pakistan also claims the territory.
- Turtle (6,363 m) saddle/pass, key observation post held by India.
- Sherpi Kangri (7,380 m), twin peaks 6 km south of Ghent Kangri (7,380 m) and 10 km northwest of Saltoro Kangri (7,742 m). Sherpi Kangri I is the higher, western summit at 7380 m. Sherpi Kangri II at approximately 7100 m is further east, it is on AGPL, held by India.

==== Northern Saltoro Ridge subsector ====
- West of Ghent Kangri (7380 m), held by India.
- West of Sia La (5,589 m or 18,336 ft), one of three key passes in the area held by India.
- West of Chogolisa (7,665 m) peak, held by Pakistan.

==== Baltoro-Gasherbrum subsector ====
- East of Baltoro Kangri (7312 m), peak itself lies in the Pakistan administered area with no Pakistani post on the peak, while Indian Army holds some of the offshoots of this peak.
- West of Gasherbrum Group (Gasherbrum II 8,035 m, Gasherbrum III 7,952 m, and Gasherbrum IV 7,925 m) peaks, held by Pakistan.
- Gasherbrum I held by China (north face), Pakistan (west face), and India (east and south face).

==== Northern subsector ====
- West of Tiger Saddle, 6.5 km northwest of Sia La, held by India.
- West of Conway Saddle (6044 m), west of and opposite to Tiger Saddle, the saddle has a Pakistan post called "Leghari Observation Post" (Leghari OP).
- East of Sia Kangri (7,422 m or 24,350 ft), west of Tiger saddle and near India-Pakistan-China trijunction, held by Pakistan (southwest face) and India (northeast face).
- West of Indira Col West (7,422 m or 24,350 ft) on Indira Ridge, on the border of Indian and Chinese controlled territory.
- AGPL End Point: AGPL ends on the Indira Ridge at the India-China-Pakistan LAC tripoint near Sia Kangri 4 km northwest of Indira Col West.

=== Trans-Karakoram LAC alignment ===
While AGPL runs through the Saltoro Mountain Range, the line which separates disputed China-held Trans-Karakoram Tract (also called Shaksgam Valley, gifted by Pakistan to China and also claimed by India) from the India-held Siachen area runs through the following features of Karakoram range as follows (from west to east):

- Indira Col
- Turkestan La, Turkestan La North and Turkestan La East.
- Singhi Kangri (7,202 m or 23,629 ft).
- Teram Kangri I (7,462 metres or 24,482 feet), Teram Kangri group is a mountain massif in the remote Siachen Muztagh subrange of the Karakoram range, Teram Kangri I is the highest peak.
- Apsarasas Kangri ( 7,245 m or 23,770 ft), has multiple peaks.
- Shaksgam La
- Karakoram Pass (5,540 m or 18,176 ft), in Depsang Plains.

=== Military posts along AGPL ===
India maintains at least 108 forward military outposts and artillery observation posts along the Actual Ground Position Line (AGPL), which runs along the Saltoro Ridge. Pakistan has around 50 posts, mostly at lower elevations west of the Saltoro ridge. Some of the well-known bases and posts are:

==== India ====
Listed south to north:

- Southern Saltoro Ridge subsector
  - Siachen Base Camp at Partapur: serves as the main base for the 102 Infantry Brigade (Siachen Brigade) includes Siachen Battle School for training and acclimatization, reachable from Leh via Khardung La.
  - Kumar Base (Kumar Base): Named after Colonel Narendra "Bull" Kumar, who played a key role in mapping Siachen. Serves as a battalion headquarters, located 60 km from Siachen Base Camp toward Indira Col.
- Central Saltoro Ridge subsector
  - Pahalwan Post:
  - Gyong La Post: Provides tactical dominance over surrounding areas.
  - Bilafond La subsector: Site of multiple Pakistani counterattacks, including one led by Brigadier Pervez Musharraf, all repelled by India.
    - Bilafond La Post:
    - Amar Post:
    - Bana Post (Quaid Post - former name by Pakistan): Captured by India in 1987 during Operation Rajiv. Requires an 80-km, 20-day trek from Siachen Base Camp.
    - Sonam Post: The highest permanently manned post in the world, located between the Amar and Bana posts. Used for logistics and observation.
- Northern Saltoro Ridge subsector
  - Sia La Post: Provides control over northern access routes.
- Northern subsector
  - Indira Post: near Indira Col, named after the Workman expedition (not Indira Gandhi). One of the northernmost posts, critical for monitoring the India-China-Pakistan tri-junction.

==== Pakistan ====
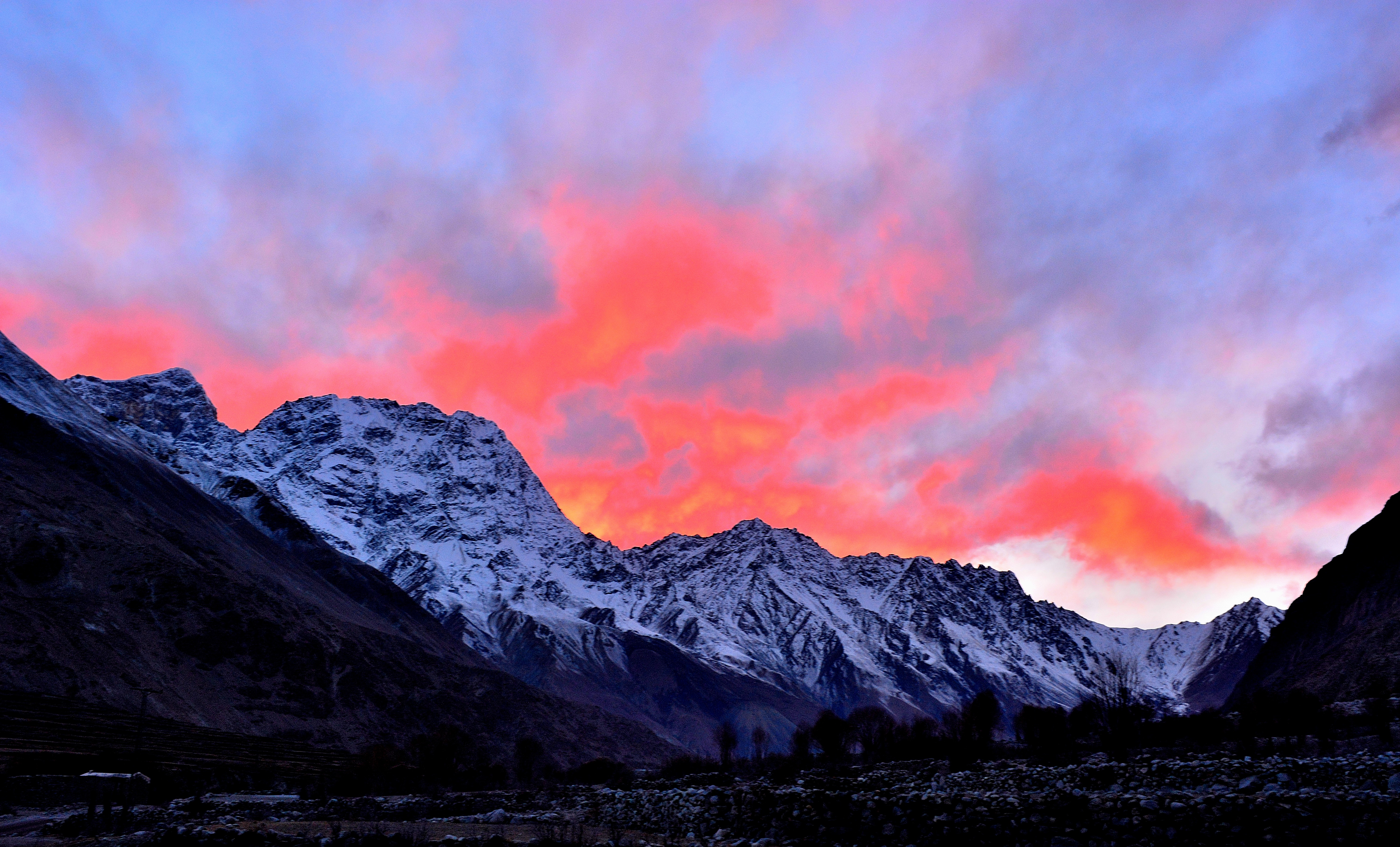
Goma

Listed south to north:

Pakistan controls the glacial valleys west of the Saltoro Ridge, at lower altitudes, with posts located on the western slopes of the ridge’s spurs.

- Southern Saltoro Ridge subsector
  - Goma Base: at lower elevation than Indian posts, is a logistical base west of the Saltoro Ridge, supporting Pakistani operations in the region. Connected by road networks, providing a logistical advantage over India’s helicopter-dependent supply lines.
  - Gayari Base Camp (~4,500 m or 14,764 ft): in the Gayari subsector, southwest of the Saltoro Ridge. Devastated by an avalanche in 2012, killing 129 soldiers and 11 civilians. Rebuilt and operational.
- Central Saltoro Ridge subsector
  - Naveed Post (~6,750 m or 22,158 ft):
- Northern Saltoro Ridge subsector
  - Conway Saddle Post (~6,032 m or 19,790 ft): at the junction of the Karakoram and Saltoro Ranges, near the Baltoro Glacier. Blocks Indian access to K2 and provides strategic oversight of surrounding peaks.

== Background context ==
=== Borders ===
The borders of India-Pakistan and their tri-junction with Tibet are:

- India–Pakistan International Border (IB)
- Line of Control (LoC)
- Line of Actual Control (LAC)
- Sir Creek (SC)
- Borders of China
- Borders of India

=== Conflicts ===
The major conflicts involving India-Pakistan and their tri-junction with Tibet are:

- Kashmir conflict
- Siachen conflict
- Sino-Indian conflict
- List of disputed territories of China
- List of disputed territories of India
- List of disputed territories of Pakistan
- Northern Areas
- Trans-Karakoram Tract

=== Military operation ===
Military operations undertaken by India and/or Pakistan in this area are:

- Operation Ababeel/Operation Meghdoot, failed Pakistan's Ababeel Operation and successful capture of Siachen by India in 1984.
- Operation Rajiv, successful operation and capture of Quaid Post (Bana Post) by India in 1987.
- Operation Qaidat/Operation Vajrashakti, by Pakistan and successful counter by India in September 1987.
- Operation Chumik/Operation Ibex, by Pakistan and successful counter by India in 1989.
- Operation Trishul Shakti, India successful thwarted Pakistani attempt to capture Bahadur post in Chulung area in 1992.
- Battle of Tyakshi Post: Pakistan Army NLI attack on the Indian Tyakshi post at the very southern edge of the Saltoro defense line was repulsed by Indian troops in May 1995.
- Battle of Point 5770 (Naveed Top/Cheema Top/Bilal Top): Indian Army under Brig. P. C. Katoch, Col. Konsam Himalaya Singh snatched control of Pt 5770 (called Naveed Top/Cheema Top/Bilal Top by Pakistanis) in Gyong La area from Pakistan troops in the southern edge of the Saltoro defense line in June 1999.

== History ==
=== Karachi Agreement and Shimla Agreement ===
The Karachi Agreement of 1949 created the Line of Control between India and Pakistan, but this line ended at a location called Khor in Nubra. The only additional relevant text for the Saltoro – Siachen area in either the 1949 or the superseding 1972 Simla Agreement was "thence north to the glaciers." The countries interpreted that differently, leading to the Siachen conflict.

=== 1972 delineation ===
As part of the Simla Agreement signed on 2 July 1972, prime ministers Indira Gandhi and Zulfikar Ali Bhutto agreed that "the line of control resulting from the ceasefire of December 17, 1971, shall be respected by both sides without prejudice to the recognised position of either side".

In November–December 1972, the military delegations of the two sides met in Suchetgarh to delineate the Line of Control. After delineation, signed maps were exchanged by the two sides and submitted to the respective governments for ratification. Scholar Brian Cloughley remarked that the delineation represented remarkable territorial precision. However, it terminated at the grid reference NJ9842, leaving undelimited 60 to 75 km to the border with China.

=== 1984 capture of Siachen by India ===
In 1984 by India's successful captured the disputed Siachen Glacier through its Operation Meghdoot, and subsequently continued with Operation Rajiv. India took control of the 76-kilometre-long (47 mi) Siachen Glacier and its tributary glaciers, as well as all the main passes and heights of the Saltoro Ridge immediately west of the glacier, including Sia La, Bilafond La, and Gyong La. Pakistan controls the glacial valleys and slopes immediately west of the Saltoro Ridge.

== Current status ==
=== Army deployment ===
Indian soldiers, following the often-internationally accepted principal of the highest watershed (mountain peaks and ridges) as the border, have held all of the Siachen Glacier and all its main passes since 1984. India launched Operation Meghdoot in 1984 during the Siachen conflict, and took control of the Siachen Glacier.

Indian Army posts are along the Saltoro Ridge, west of the main Siachen glacier, along a line roughly connecting Gyong La, Bilafond La, Sia La, and Indira Col. Pakistan controls the region west of Saltoro Ridge. India has more than 50 military posts across the length of AGPL which are located almost 3,000 ft above Pakistani posts, with 80 km line of sight visibility range in the clear weather. The Indian soldiers hold on to the heights on the ridge, preventing the Pakistani soldiers from climbing up to the Saltoro Range heights.

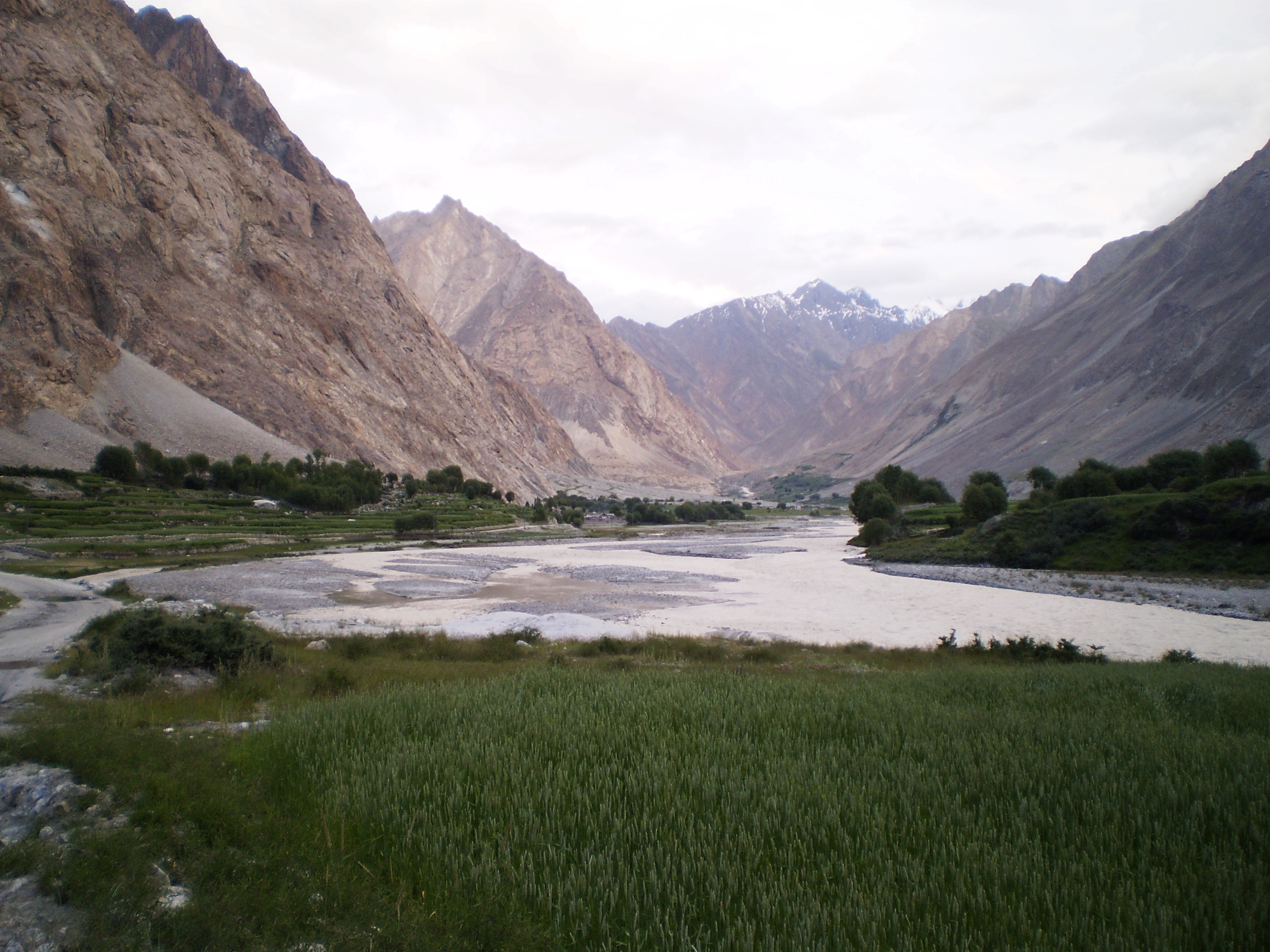
Goma, Gilgit and Baltistan

The Pakistan Army has base camps at Goma and posts at its Gayari subsector in the sub glaciers southwest of the Saltoro Range, and access on the Baltoro Glacier to the Conway Saddle in the northern extremes of the region. The peaks and passes under Pakistan's control such as Gayari Camp, Chogolisa, Baltoro Glacier, Conway Saddle, Baltoro Muztagh, and Gasherbrum lie west of the AGPL.

=== Tourism ===
India allows several tourist and civilian activities in Siachen area. To exploit the potential for tourism, the government is making ongoing efforts to improve connectivity. There is a recurring planned annual civilian expedition from Siachen Base Camp to Indira Ridge, Indira Col and other features. India has opened up the entire area from Siachen Base Camp at 12,000 ft to Kumar Post at 15,000 ft for the regular tourism for the civilians. Bana Post at 20,500 ft will remain off limit to tourists. Temperatures drop to below minus 60 degrees Celsius during the winter.

Until 2010, civilian tourists were permitted only in the Nubra Valley up to Panamik. Since 2010 tourist have been permitted in Nubra Valley up to Turtuk and beyond to Tyakshi on the LAC; both of these villages were captured from Pakistan by India in Indo-Pakistani War of 1971. From 2019, medically fit civilians below the age of 45 are allowed up to Kumar Base (16,000 ft) on a 30-day trek organised by Army Adventure Cell in August–September, during which tourists go through the highly altitude conditioning at Leh Base, Siachen Base and forward staging posts, at the end of which they undertake an extreme adventure 9-day return track from Siachen Base to Kumar Base 60 km away.

In 2018, five road routes and four trails with a night stay in Ladakh were opened for the tourists by the Government of India (GoI), all located above the altitude of 14,000 ft, and the maximum limit of travel permit was raised from 7 days to 15 days:

== In the popular culture ==
Books on the topic are:

- Beyond NJ 9842: The Siachen Saga
- Meghdoot : The Beginning of the Coldest War

== See also ==
- Awards and decorations of the Indian Armed Forces
- Bana Singh, after whom Quaid Post was renamed to Bana Top
- List of extreme points of India
- Sino-Pakistan Agreement for transfer of Trans-Karakoram Tract to China
