= La Yongma Ri =

Mountain peak

- Location within India Location within Ladakh

Highest point
- Elevation: 6,826 m (22,395 ft)
- Prominence: 1,203 m (3,947 ft)
- Coordinates: 35°01′30″N 77°08′53″E

Geography
- Location: Ladakh

Climbing
- First ascent: No records

La Yongma Ri s a mountain peak located at 6,826 m (22,395 ft) above sea level in the southern main ridge of the Saltoro Mountains, a sub-range of the Karakoram. The nearby mountain pass is called the Yarma La (6,100m). The Saltoro Mountains Range, of which western slopes are held by Pakistan and separated by the Actual Ground Position Line (AGPL) the higher peaks and passes are held by India all of which remain snowbound throughout the year, provides access to Siachen Glacier to its east through five passes, i.e., listed from south to north are Chulung La (5,800m), Yarma La (6,100m), Gyong La (5,640m), Bilafond La (6,160m) - also called Saltoro La, and Sia La (7,300m).

== Location ==
The peak is located in the disputed border region between Pakistan's Gilgit-Baltistan territory and the Indian administered Ladakh region to the southwest of the Siachen Glacier. The so-called "Line of Control" runs about 4 km north of the summit. Its west flank drains south to the Shyok, while the east flank lies in the Nubra River Basin.

The K12 (mountain) at 32 km north-northwest, forms the dominance reference point.
