= AGPL =

AGPL may refer to:

- Actual Ground Position Line, the current line dividing Indian and Pakistani forces in the Siachen Glacier
- GNU Affero General Public License, a free software license published in 2007 to succeed the original Affero GPL published in 2002
