= 2012 Gayari Sector avalanche =

Natural disaster in Pakistan

- Location of the Gayari Sector region in relation to Pakistan
- Date: 7 April 2012
- Time: 06:00 am PKT (01:00 UTC)
- Location: Gayari military base, Ghanche District, Gilgit-Baltistan, Pakistan; 35.21355°N 076.835591°E
- Casualties: 129 Pakistani soldiers and 11 civilians

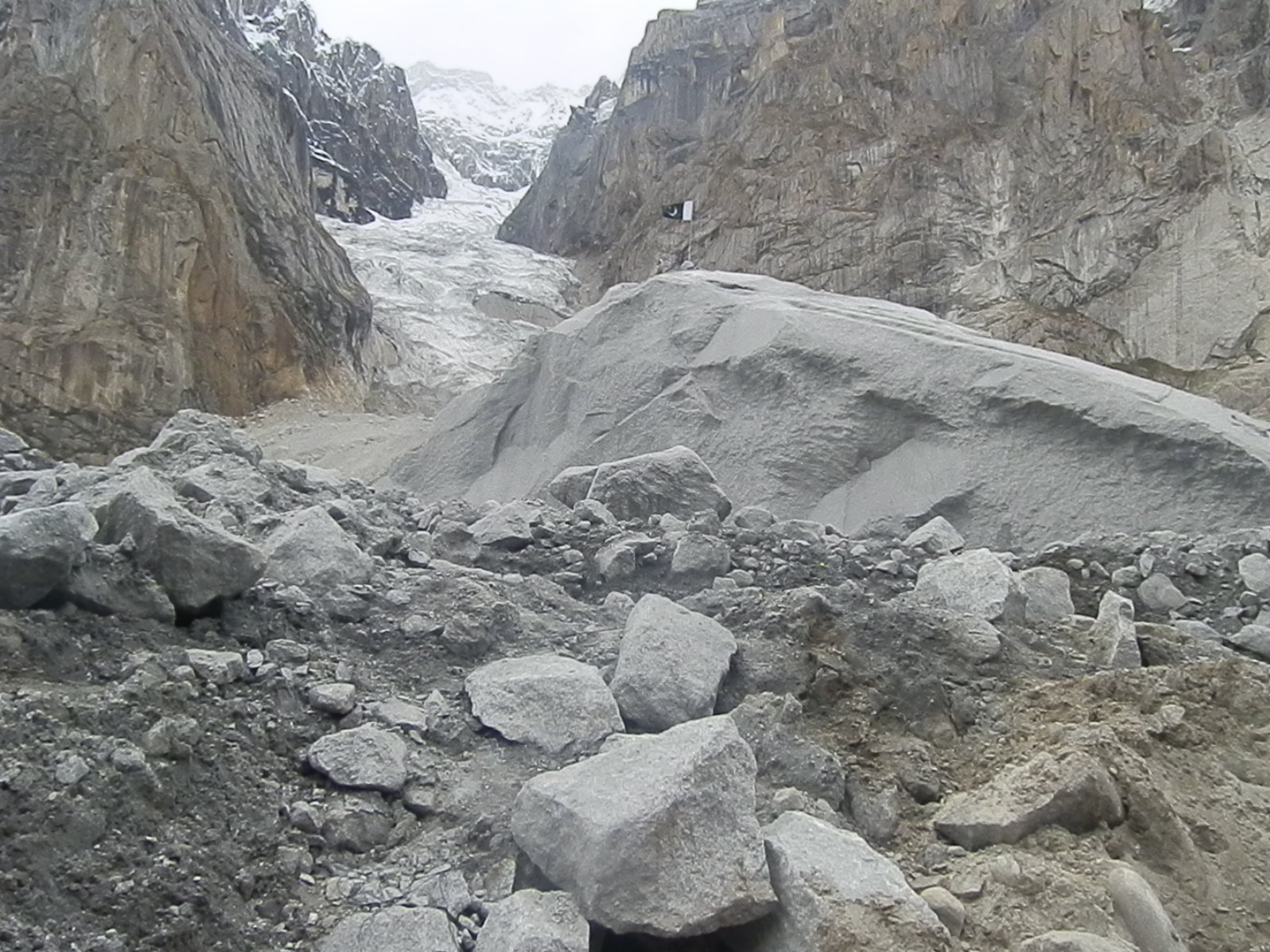
Pakistan flag atop the debris.

On 7 April 2012, an avalanche hit a Pakistan Army base in Gayari Sector, near the Siachen Glacier region, trapping 140 soldiers and civilian contractors under deep snow. The incident occurred at an altitude of about 4,000 meters and 300 km northeast of Skardu (capital of Baltistan). It was the worst avalanche that the Pakistani military has experienced in the area.

On 29 May 2012, Pakistan declared that the 129 soldiers and 11 civilians were killed.

== Background ==
The Siachen Glacier region in the eastern Karakoram range in the Himalaya mountains has been the site of intermittent conflict between India and Pakistan for several decades. In 1949, a ceasefire line was negotiated between the two countries in an effort to resolve the competing territorial claims of the violent Kashmir conflict. The agreement, however, did not clearly delineate Siachen as either Indian or Pakistani, and competing claims to the barren, unpopulated area began to escalate. Both sides issued numerous mountaineering permits for the area during the 1970s and 1980s, fearing that the other's expeditions indicated plans to formalise control over the glacier and its surroundings. Thus, both India and Pakistan began planning military operations to pre-empt the other's designs. On 13 April 1984, India launched Operation Meghdoot with the objective of taking control of the area, fearing it would fall into Pakistani hands. The operation was successful, and India extended its control over much of the triangle of mountainous, icy land, up to and including the passes of the Saltoro Ridge situated west of the Siachen Glacier, while Pakistan retained control over the western slopes and foothills of that ridge. Although the Pakistani military launched numerous attempts to wrest the region from Indian control until the 2003 ceasefire, the situation on the ground changed little, and the front stagnated along the Actual Ground Position Line (AGPL), which trends northward from the northern end of the Line of Control between India and Pakistan in the Kashmir region. With troops deployed at elevations up to 6,700 metres (22,000 feet) above sea level, the glacier region has come to be known as "the world's highest battlefield". Thousands of troops from both sides remain stationed on at least 150 bases on the glacier and surrounding mountains and valleys. The simmering conflict over the glacier region costs both countries millions of dollars each year.

Avalanches are known to occur frequently in the Siachen region, though casualties from them are generally low due to the fact that they normally strike remote, high-altitude "forward bases" with only a handful of troops. The most devastating one prior to this occurred in 2010, in which 24 Pakistani soldiers were killed.

The winter of 2011–2012 in Kashmir was unusually harsh, marked by numerous heavy snowfalls and sharp temperature drops.

== Avalanche ==
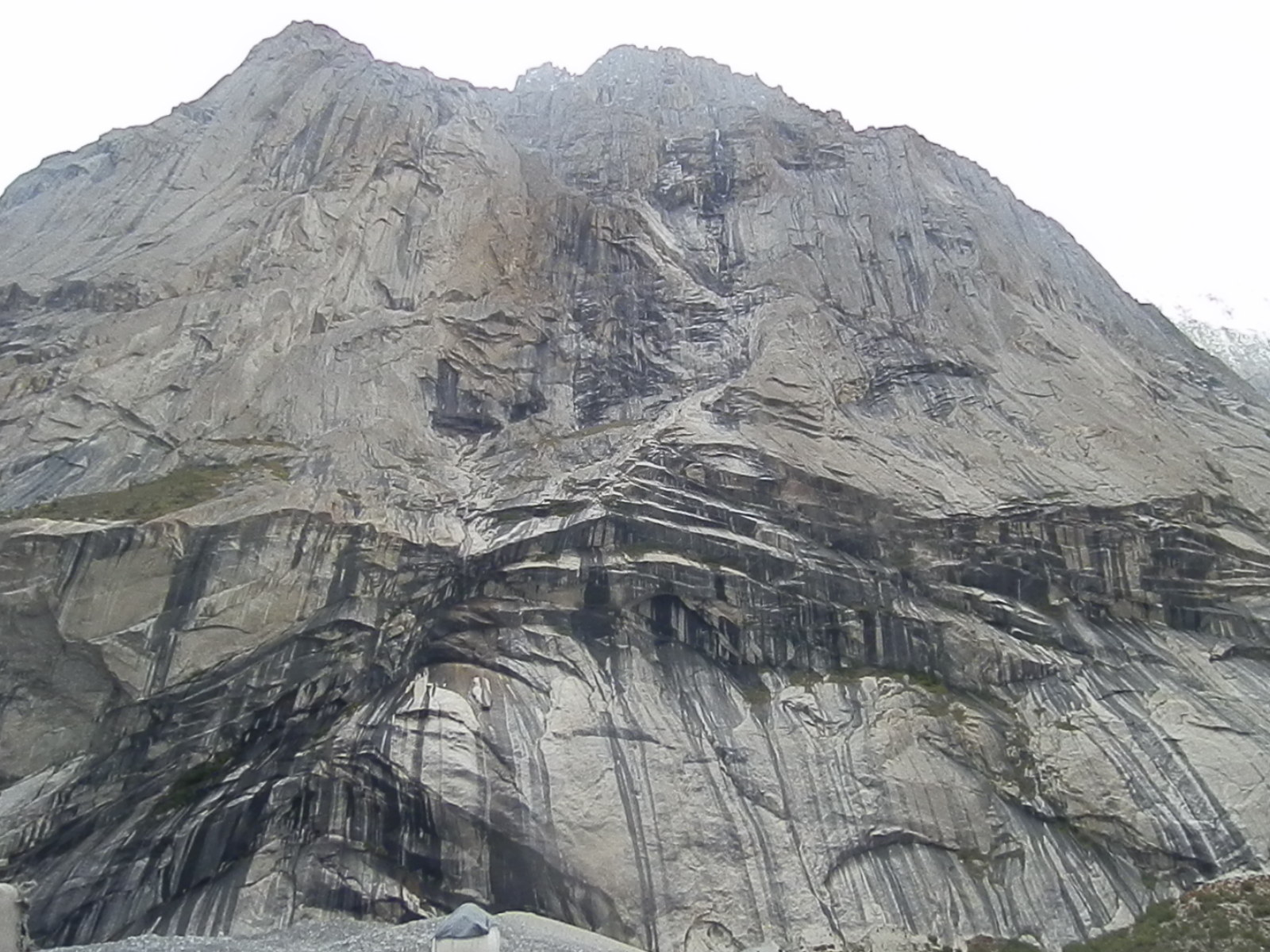
Oil stained face of the mountain. Gayari Camp was located at its foot. Barrels of POL were thrown against the mountain by the sheer force of the avalanche.

Around 2:00 am Pakistan Standard Time (PKT) on 7 April 2012, a massive ice avalanche struck a Pakistani military headquarters at Gayari, 30 km west of the Siachen Glacier terminus, near the Siachen glacier region. Located in a deep valley at 3,775 metres (12,385 feet) above sea level, the Gayari base is one of the most important Pakistani bases in the area. It is a vital supply hub for troops and materiel passing through to more remote bases, and is not far from a military hospital. At the time of the ice avalanche, the base was occupied by soldiers of the 6th Northern Light Infantry battalion, a unit trained in mountain operations. Avalanches are uncommon in the area of Gayari; due to the low avalanche risk, Gayari was a bigger complex and housed many more soldiers than other bases in the Siachen region. The glacier avalanche broke off at an elevation of around 4560 meters above sea level in a distance of around 1300 m from the camp.

Initial reports indicated that at least 100 Pakistani soldiers, including a colonel and a commander, had been trapped under an estimated 21 metres (69 feet) of snow, covering an area of 1 square kilometre. The number of people missing was later stated to be at least 135: "at least 124 soldiers and 11 civilian contractors". No communication with any person from the base was reported after the avalanche. A list of 135 names of those missing was later released by the Inter-Services Public Relations of Pakistan Armed Forces.

The army declared all victims of the avalanche as 'Shuhada' (martyrs), as the nature and magnitude of the disaster indicated minimal chances of recovering any survivors.

== Rescue operation ==
An avalanche rescue operation was quickly launched by the Pakistani military. Over 150 soldiers—using helicopters, rescue dogs, and heavy machinery airlifted from the main garrison in Rawalpindi—began searching the area for the missing soldiers and contractors, with "a team of doctors and paramedics" standing by. Local reports initially indicated that the operation had recovered at least 12 bodies by the end of the day, but official reports stated that no victims had been found, dead or alive.

Ghanche District highlighted in maroon

Due to the remoteness and extreme weather conditions, rescue operations were expected to take several days to complete. Nevertheless, official Pakistani military sources remained "hopeful", and an anticipated improvement in weather conditions was expected to quicken the operation after initial efforts on the night of 7–8 April were cut short due to bad weather and darkness.

However, other sources expressed a much more grave view of the situation. An unnamed senior military officer said "All we can do now is pray. It is such a desperately tough place that it [would] need a miracle for someone to have survived." Pakistani Army Colonel Sher Khan, an expert in mountain warfare sent by the military to oversee the rescue operation, said that "there is no hope, there is no chance at all" for those buried under the snow, and noted that any survivors of the avalanche itself would have died within minutes from exposure to the elements.

By 9 April, rescue crews working at the scene of the disaster had managed to clear an area of snow measuring approximately 12 metres (39 feet) in length, 9 metres (30 feet) in width, and 3 metres (9.8 feet) in depth, but despite initial hopes for clearer conditions, inclement weather continued to hamper the operation. A team of eight US military experts sent to Pakistan to assist the over 300 Pakistanis—286 soldiers and 60 civilians by this time—already working at the disaster area was unable to make it to the far northern site due to the weather, and official military statements still indicated that no bodies or survivors had been found by rescuers. The Pakistan Army had dispatched its chief of staff, General Ashfaq Parvez Kayani, to the Siachen region to lead the operation. Two additional groups of foreigners were also expected to arrive in Islamabad on the evening of 9 April the country to provide further aid: three Swiss "experts" and a six-member German "disaster management team" with additional equipment.

By 10 April, the rescue crew had increased to 452 people, 69 of them civilians, with nine pieces of heavy machinery pressed into service for digging out the avalanche site, and had begun excavating five points on the disaster site in search of victims—two with heavy machinery, three without. The teams from Germany and Switzerland had arrived in Rawalpindi, joining the American team, which had still not yet reached the site due to weather. A seven-man specialist team was using life detection kits and thermal imaging cameras in an attempt to detect any residual body warmth from those buried under the snow and debris. The Pakistan Army released a revised list of those missing, the number climbing to 138. Snow was expected for the next two days, further frustrating rescue efforts as the possibility of finding survivors dwindled to next to none.

On 18 April 2013, the army resumed the search operation for the remaining bodies of the victims of April 2012 avalanche in Gayari sector near the Siachen glacier after improvement of weather and melting of snow. The search operation was suspended on 27 November 2012 due to winter season. 121 bodies were recovered in 2012 whereas 19 bodies were yet to be found.

As of 8 June 2013, search & rescue teams of the army had recovered 131 dead bodies while search for the remaining nine continued.

On 2 October 2013, Pakistan Army Chief General Ashfaq Pervez Kayani said that 133 bodies had so far been recovered from Gayari sector while search for the remaining seven continued.

== Speculation about causes ==
Experts advanced various theories as to the cause of the disaster. The president of the Alpine Club of Pakistan, Manzoor Hussain, suggested that a piece of the main glacier had broken off and obliterated the camp. However, retired Pakistani Colonel Sher Khan said that the disaster was likely a landslide caused by heavy precipitation, not an avalanche: "In this case, a huge flood of water is coming down from the sky and creates a lot of mud and loose earth on the mountain. Mostly boulders, mud, and water ran down the mountain." He predicted that freezing temperatures would have hardened the mass of snow and debris, complicating digging efforts.

A Pakistani newspaper article using Pakistan Meteorological Department data accused India of carrying out extensive military activities that caused the avalanche. The article cited the melting of ice at the terminus of the Siachen Glacier and suggested that large carbon deposits from Indian military activity led to increased solar radiation as one of the prime causes of the incident. However, there are no Indian troops within 15 km of either the avalanche site or the avalanche source basin, and no part of the Siachen Glacier itself is within 30 km of the avalanche site, which is separated from the Siachen system by the 5000 to 7500 meter high Saltoro Ridge. A study by a non-governmental organization revealed poor waste collection mechanisms by Indian forces, almost entirely located in the Siachen Glacier basin, who produce 1000 kilograms of waste a day that is packed in drums. These drums of waste are thrown in crevasses, at the rate of about 4000 drums a year. However, the avalanche site is 15 km west of any part of the Siachen basin, near the Gayari (Ghyari) River just below the Bilafond La, neither of which flow from or connect with the Siachen Glacier system.

Another conspiracy theory involves the use of the Indian KALI project to melt the ice of the slope to cause the avalanche known by the codename Operation Whitewash, though no strong sources have been reported on the topic. However, on 14 July 2018, Parliament asked the Indian government whether there was any proposal to make use of KALI 5000 in the armed forces. The former Defence Minister of India Manohar Parrikar replied in writing to the Lok Sabha that, "The desired information is sensitive in nature and its disclosure is not in the interest of national security." The Government also refused to give any information of testing KALI laser weapon.

== Reactions ==
=== Pakistani reactions ===
Then-Prime Minister Yousaf Raza Gilani expressed his shock at the incident, and said it "would in no way undermine the high morale of soldiers and officers".

Speaking to Al Jazeera, Shaukat Qadir, a retired Pakistani Brigadier and current political analyst, called the incident "the biggest casualty that has ever happened", and noted that more soldiers have died from the extreme elements than from combat during the entire Siachen conflict: "[T]he fact of matter is that 70 per cent of the people have died because of natural causes, and I think this is the time we ended this damn conflict, which has absolutely no explanation." He also expressed hope that the incident would help bring an end to the Siachen conflict, and that a meeting in India, between Pakistani President Asif Ali Zardari and Indian Prime Minister Manmohan Singh, on 8 April could help "settle this issue for both sides".

Zardari was ostensibly visiting India for a day to make a personal religious pilgrimage to the Sufi shrine at Ajmer Sharif, but took the opportunity to meet informally with Singh to discuss matters of state. Zardari has presided over a considerable thaw in Indo-Pakistani relations, repudiating the official Pakistani "first nuclear strike" position, granting "most favoured nation" status to India, and declaring that both countries should "freeze the issue of Kashmir for a generation".

Expressing great sorrow and extending condolences to the families of the victims, the Human Rights Commission of Pakistan (HRCP) demanded that "conditions in which the soldiers were stationed at the glacier" be investigated to assess the adequacy of the safety measures in place to protect those troops stationed in Siachen. The HCRP also urged India and Pakistan to continue to pursue a resolution to the Siachen conflict.

The army declared all the victims of Gayari sector avalanche as martyrs.

=== International reactions ===
- (India) During the Zardari-Singh talks, which Zardari described as "fruitful", Singh offered humanitarian assistance to aid the Pakistani rescue effort. Zardari expressed gratitude for the offer and said that he would accept Indian help if needed.
- The United States embassy in Islamabad released a statements expressing "deep concern for the brave Pakistani soldiers that are currently trapped as a result of an avalanche in Gayari Sector of the Siachen Glacier" region and offered American assistance in the rescue operation. The United States dispatched an eight-member rescue team from Kabul, Afghanistan to Islamabad to provide advice and aid in the rescue efforts.

== See also ==
- List of avalanches
- Environmental issues in Siachen
