= K12 (mountain) =

Peak in the Karakoram mountain range on Indian side of LOC

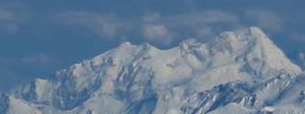
- K12 viewed from K2

Highest point
- Elevation: 7,428 m (24,370 ft); Ranked 61st
- Prominence: 1,978 m (6,490 ft)
- Listing: Ultra
- Coordinates: 35°17′42″N 77°01′18″E

Geography
- Location within Karakoram Location within Ladakh Location within India
- The major peaks in Karakoram are rank identified by height. Legend: 1：K2; 2：Gasherbrum I, K5; 3：Broad Peak; 4：Gasherbrum II, K4; 5：Gasherbrum III, K3a; 6：Gasherbrum IV, K3; 7：Distaghil Sar; 8：Kunyang Chhish; 9：Masherbrum, K1; 10：Batura Sar, Batura I; 11：Rakaposhi; 12：Batura II; 13：Kanjut Sar; 14：Saltoro Kangri, K10; 15：Batura III; 16： Saser Kangri I, K22; 17：Chogolisa; 18：Shispare; 19：Trivor Sar; 20：Skyang Kangri; 21：Mamostong Kangri, K35; 22：Saser Kangri II; 23：Saser Kangri III; 24：Pumari Chhish; 25：Passu Sar; 26：Yukshin Gardan Sar; 27：Teram Kangri I; 28：Malubiting; 29：K12; 30：Sia Kangri; 31：Momhil Sar; 32：Skil Brum; 33：Haramosh Peak; 34：Ghent Kangri; 35：Ultar Sar; 36：Rimo Massif; 37：Sherpi Kangri; 38：Yazghil Dome South; 39：Baltoro Kangri; 40：Crown Peak; 41：Baintha Brakk; 42：Yutmaru Sar; 43：K6; 44：Muztagh Tower; 45：Diran; 46：Apsarasas Kangri I; 47：Rimo III; 48：Gasherbrum V
- Location: Saltoro Ridge, Siachen, Actual Ground Position Line
- Parent range: Saltoro Mountains, Karakoram

Climbing
- First ascent: 1974 by Shinichi Takagi, Tsutomu Ito (Japanese)
- Easiest route: snow/ice climb

K12 is the second highest peak in the Saltoro Mountains, a subrange of the Karakoram range in the Siachen region and is administered as a part of Ladakh territory. Its name comes from its designation given during the original survey of the Karakoram range. In 1984, an Indian army expedition under Colonel Prem Chand took hold of this peak, from the side of Siachen glacier by traversing from the west.

K12 lies to the southwest of the Siachen Glacier; the K12 glacier heads on its northeast slopes and feeds the Siachen. The western slopes of K12 drain to the Bilafond Glacier system, and thence to the Dansam River, and eventually the Indus River.

K12 was used for training for the Mount Everest expedition of the Indian Army in 1985. Apart from this, K12 has seen little climbing activity, partly because of the unsettled political situation and the continued military presence in the area linked to the Siachen conflict. It was first attempted in 1960, after a reconnaissance visit by famed explorer Eric Shipton in 1957. After a further unsuccessful attempt by a Japanese party in 1971, another Japanese expedition put two climbers, Shinichi Takagi and Tsutomu Ito, on the summit. They fell and died on the descent, and their bodies were not recovered. Another Japanese expedition returned in 1975 and made the second ascent.

== See also ==
- List of ultras of the Karakoram and Hindu Kush
- Indira Col
- Sia La
- Ghent Kangri
- Saltoro Kangri
- Bilafond La
- Chumik Glacier
- Gyong La

== Sources ==
- Wala, Jerzy (1990). Orographical Sketch Map of the Karakoram (Map). Swiss Foundation for Alpine Research.
- Neate, Jill (1989). High Asia: an illustrated history of the 7,000 metre peaks. The Mountaineers.
