= Sia La =

Mountain pass in Ladakh

- Location within Ladakh Location within India
- Interactive map of Sia La
- Elevation: 5,589 metres (18,337 ft)

Third Approach
- Location: Ladakh; controlled by India (claimed by Pakistan)
- Range: Eastern Karakoram Range
- Coordinates: 35°34′55″N 76°47′33″E

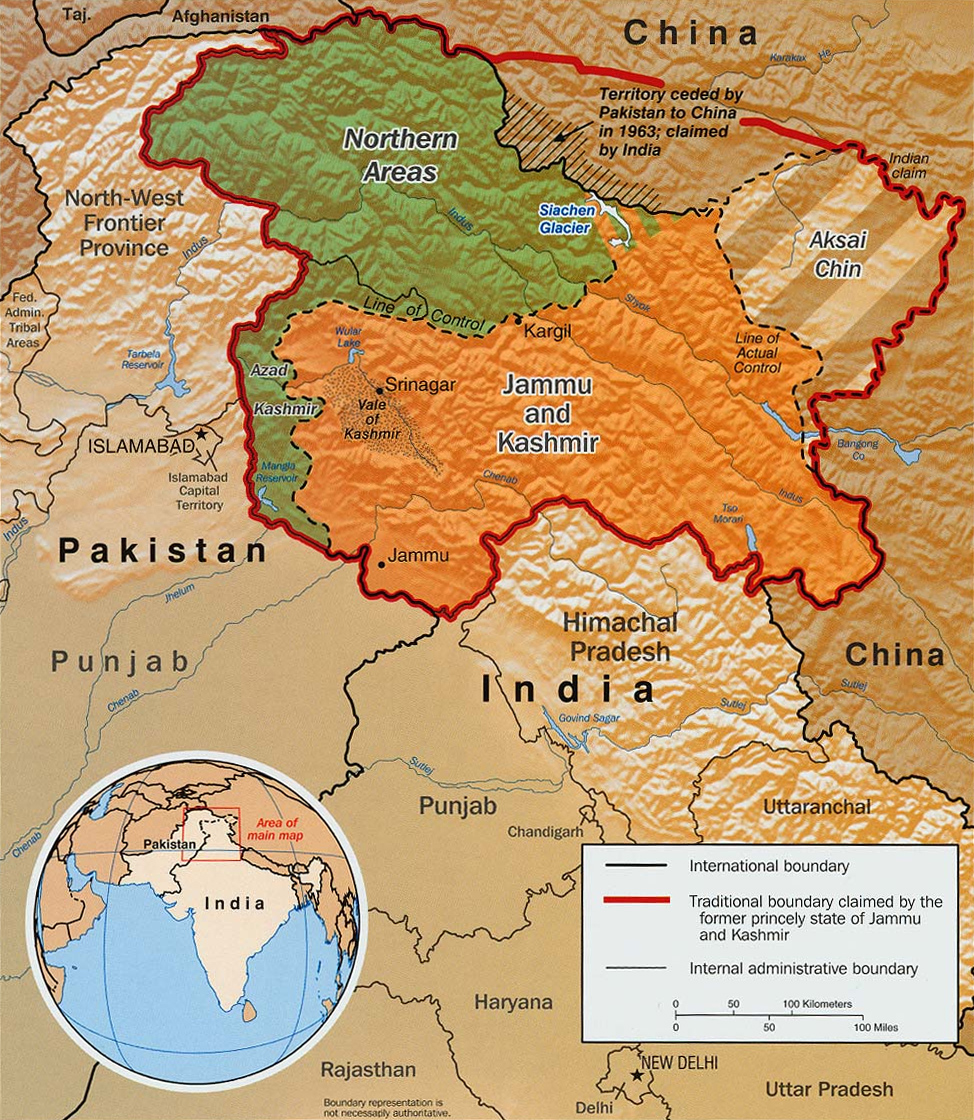
Indo-Pak mutually-agreed undisputed "International Border" (IB) in the black line, Indo-Pak "Line of Control" (LoC) in black dotted line in the north and west, Indo-Sino "Line of Actual" (LAC) in black dotted line in the east, Indo-Pak line across Siachen in north is "Actual Ground Position Line" (AGPL). The areas shown in green are the two Pakistani-controlled areas: Gilgit–Baltistan in the north and Azad Kashmir in the south. The area shown in orange is the Indian-controlled territories of Jammu and Kashmir, and Ladakh, and the diagonally-hatched area to the east is the Chinese-controlled area known as Aksai Chin. "Territories ceded by Pakistan to China claimed by India" in the north is Shaksgam (Trans-Karakoram Tract).

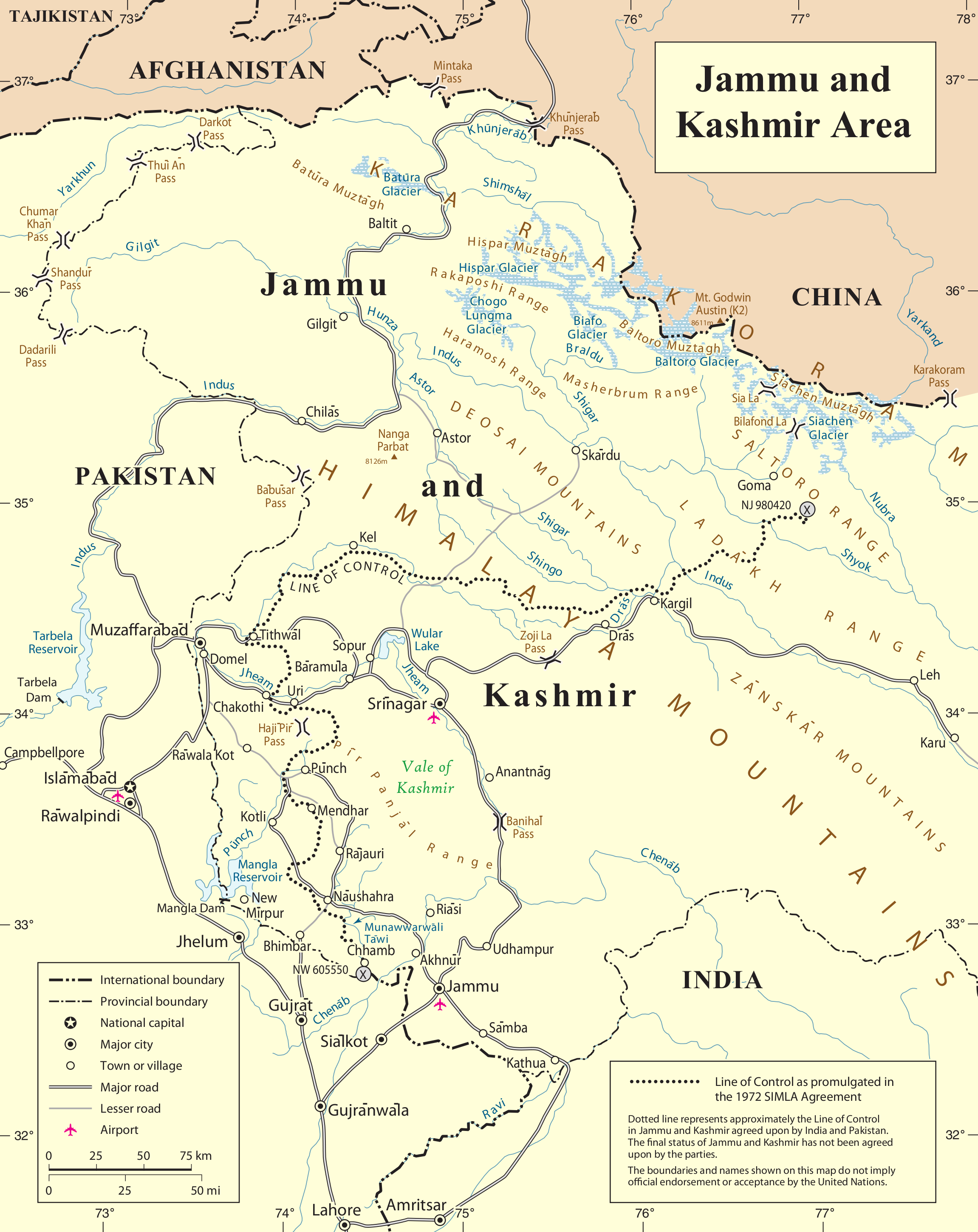
United Nations map of Siachen Glacier showing "Point NJ980420" (Point NJ9842) as the starting point of the "Actual Ground Position Line" (AGPL), Goma military camp of Pakistan, Nubra River valley and Siachen glaciers held by India, and Bilafond La and Sia La (north of NJ9842) also held by India. Masherbrum Range, Baltoro Glacier, Baltoro Muztagh and K2 are held by Pakistan.

Sia La is a mountain pass situated on Saltoro Ridge some 60 km (37 mi) north-northwest of map point NJ9842 which defined the end of the 1972 Line of Control between India and Pakistan as part of the Simla Agreement. Sia La is under Indian control and sits near the Line of Actual Control between India and China and is immediately northwest of the upper part of the vast Siachen Glacier, connecting that glacier to the Pakistani-controlled Kondus Glacier and valley to the west.

The Saltoro Mountains Range, of which western slopes are held by Pakistan and separated by the Actual Ground Position Line (AGPL) the higher peaks and passes are held by India all of which remain snowbound throughout the year, provides access to Siachen Glacier to its east through five passes, i.e., listed from south to north are Chulung La (5,800m), Yarma La (6,100m), Gyong La (5,640m), Bilafond La (6,160m) - also called Saltoro La, and Sia La (7,300m).

== Geopolitical issues ==
Sia La, as well as nearby passes Bilafond La and Gyong La, saw military action starting in 1984 during Operation Meghdoot, the first military action of the Siachen conflict, itself being part of larger conflict, the Kashmir conflict. All three passes are currently held by India. However, Pakistan controls a pass just to the west that overlooks Sia La, named Conway Saddle which has Pakistan Army's Leghari Observation Post (Leghari OP) on the Actual Ground Position Line (AGPL).

== See also ==
Near the AGPL (Actual Ground Position Line)

- NJ9842 LoC ends and AGPL begins
- Gyong La
- Chumik Glacier
- Saltoro Mountains
- Saltoro Kangri
- Ghent Kangri
- Bilafond La
- Indira Col, AGPL ends at LAC

Borders

- Actual Ground Position Line (AGPL)
- India–Pakistan International Border (IB)
- Line of Control (LoC)
- Line of Actual Control (LAC)
- Sir Creek (SC)
- Borders of China
- Borders of India
- Borders of Pakistan

Conflicts

- Kashmir conflict
- Siachen conflict
- Sino-Indian conflict
- List of disputed territories of China
- List of disputed territories of India
- List of disputed territories of Pakistan
- Northern Areas
- Trans-Karakoram Tract

Operations

- Operation Meghdoot, by India
- Operation Rajiv, by India
- Operation Safed Sagar, by India

Other related topics

- Awards and decorations of the Indian Armed Forces
- Bana Singh, after whom Quaid Post was renamed to Bana Top
- Dafdar, westernmost town in Trans-Karakoram Tract
- India-China Border Roads
- List of extreme points of India
- Sino-Pakistan Agreement for transfer of Trans-Karakoram Tract to China

== Citations ==
- Close C, Burrard S, Younghusband F, et al. (1930). "Nomenclature in the Karakoram: Discussion". The Geographical Journal. 76 (2). Blackwell Publishing: 148–158. doi:10.2307/1783980. JSTOR 1783980.
- "A Slow Thaw". Time. 7 November 2005. Archived from the original on 11 September 2005.
