= Dhallewali =

Village in the Punjab, Pakistan

Coordinates: 32°39′0″N 74°29′0″E

Dhallewali is a village of Sialkot District in the Punjab province of Pakistan. It is located at 32°38'60N 74°28'60E and has an altitude of 235 m (771 ft).
