= Akhnoor Dagger =

Akhnoor Bulge Akhnoor Dagger (named by Pakistan), Pakistan's Chicken neck (named by India)
- Interactive map of Akhnoor Bulge
- Location in Punjab, Pakistan
- Coordinates: 32.81°N 74.68°E
- Country: Pakistan
- Province: Punjab
- District: Sialkot
- Elevation: 301 m (988 ft)
- Time zone: UTC+5:00 (PST)

Akhnoor Bulge, (named Akhnoor Dagger by Pakistani Military, and as Pakistan's Akhnoor Chicken's neck Corridor by Indian Military) is the name for a narrow strip of Pakistani territory that juts into the Indian-administered Kashmir south of Akhnoor. This sensitive piece of land on Pakistan's border with Indian-administered Kashmir is part of Sialkot District and measures roughly 170 km^{2} (66 sq mi).

Akhnoor is less than 30 km from Jammu in India and less than 50 km from Sialkot in Pakistan. The Akhnoor Bulge saw a major Pakistani attack during the Indo-Pakistani War of 1965 (Operation Grand Slam) in which Pakistan eventually failed after making some initial gains. During Indo-Pakistani war of 1971 India captured the Bulge and held it before returning it to Pakistan under the Simla Agreement,

Earlier in 1965, when Akhnoor had only one bridge before India embarked on significant infrastructure development, the tip of the Pakistani area was less than 10 km from the only bridge across the Chenab River at Akhnoor in India. In the 1965 war (Operation Grand Slam), Pakistan viewed the capture of the Akhnoor Bridge as a means of cutting Jammu and Kashmir—especially the Poonch and Rajouri districts—from the rest of India, as it was perceived as the sole corridor between mainland India and most of Jammu and Kashmir and Ladakh.

However, this Akhnoor Bulge being a "dagger" or India's "Chicken's Neck" vulnerability, as perceived by Pakistan in 1965, has since been described by some analysts as a strategic myth, "the so-called 'Chicken's Neck' or Akhnoor Dagger area... proved to be a liability for Pakistan rather than an asset in the 1971 war when Indian forces successfully captured the area". This is evidenced by India's swift 1971 capture of the area, which effectively negated the perceived threat to Akhnoor. Any perceived vulnerability of India is further mitigated by improved infrastructure development by India, which now has many more high-capacity bridges and numerous alternate transport links connecting Jammu to Akhnoor and India to wider Jammu and Kashmir region, providing redundancy and resilience to the military supply lines.

In fact, the area has been argued to be a Pakistani vulnerability, as the land is a narrow doab between the Chenab and Tawi rivers surrounded by India from three sides, and is further doubly-isolated from the rest of Pakistan by the Chenab–Munawar Tawi doab to its southwest within Pakistan.

== Etymology ==
Akhnoor, towns name, is from mughal era meaning "aankh ka noor" (lit. light of the eye), meaning precious, however Akhnoor town itself finds mention as the Virat Nagri (lit mighty city) in Mahabharata and Pandavas spent time in the area during the last year of their exile.

Pakistan named the area Akhnoor dagger, symbolising an attacking dagger into Akhnoor as perceived by the Pakistani Military as a means of attack on Akhnoor and cutting Jammu and Kashmir from India.

Indian Army's Lieutenant General Zorawar Chand Bakshi, who was the GOC (general officer commanding) of the 26th Indian Infantry Division in Jammu during the 1971 India-Pakistan war, naming it as Pakistan's "'Chicken’s Neck' he said should be wrung and broken off", thus successfully changing India's stance from defensive to offensive, by busting Pakistani myth of dagger into India's so-called chicken neck vulnerability.

== Geography ==
It is a peninsula-like doab formed by the north–south flowing Chenab River and its tributary north–south flowing Tawi River (also known as the Jammu Tawi), both of which originate in the north in India-administered Jammu and Kashmir territory and confluence 8 km south of the Indian border in Pakistan at Marala Headworks near Dhallewali village of Sialkot District of Punjab province of Pakistan. The north–south flowing Manawar Tawi River also confluences at Marala Headworks, forming a triveni sangam of the three rivers, thus further isolating the Pakistan-held Akhnoor Bulge by the Chenab–Manawar Tawi doab on its western side, which is already isolated from the rest of Pakistan by the Chenab–Tawi doab.

Marala Headworks is nearly 30 km south of Akhnoor in India, 10–12 km south of the India-Pakistan border, 20 km north of Sialkot and 140 km north of Lahore. The Pakistan-held area within the Chenab–Tawi doab is the narrow protrusion known by Pakistan as the "Dagger" and by India as the "Chicken's Neck", which is a strategically sensitive area because of its proximity to the crucial transport link to Akhnoor in India (such as NH-44 Srinagar-Kanyakumari Highway, Delhi–Amritsar–Katra Expressway, and Jammu–Baramulla rail line).

== History ==
=== 1965 War ===
During the 1965 Indo-Pakistani War, Pakistan launched a major attack Operation Grand Slam including in Akhnoor which aimed to capture Akhnoor through the Akhnoor Bulge, which could potentially have choked the Indian Army in the region; however, the plan failed.

Initial success and failure of Pakistan: Pakistani forces, with superior tanks and initial surprise, made rapid advances, capturing areas like Chhamb and Jourian and coming within a few kilometers of Akhnoor town. The Akhnoor sector was lightly defended by four Indian infantry battalions and a squadron of tanks. The infantry was stretched thin along the border and the AMX-13 tanks were no match for the Pakistani M47 Patton and M48 Patton tanks. Against a militarily stronger and larger Pakistani thrust, the Indian forces retreated from their defensive positions. According to Pakistani military historian Major (retd.) A. H. Amin, the Pakistani forces in Operation Grand Slam had a 6 to 1 advantage over Indian AMX-13 tanks, which were like 'matchboxes' in front of the Pakistani Pattons. In terms of artillery, Pakistan's 8-inch guns were superior to anything that Indians had at that time and had an overall superiority of 6 to 1.

However, the operation was stalled due to a change in Pakistani command and, more importantly, because India responded by opening a new war front in the Lahore sector of Pakistan.

=== 1971 War ===
In the Indo-Pakistani war of 1971, the strip was captured by India and returned to Pakistan with the Simla Agreement the following year.

While Pakistan was focused on its offensive in the Chhamb area, learning from 1965 Pakistani attack Indian forces proactively captured Pakistan's Chicken's Neck area (Akhnoor Dagger) on the night of 5–6 December 1971 and Pakistan made no further attempts to cross the river Munawar Tawi till the end of war. The Indian forces, commanded by Lieutenant General Zorawar Chand Bakhshi, executed a move to outflank the Pakistani forces and captured the Chicken's Neck in a move intended to isolate Pakistani forces and neutralise the "dagger" threat to Akhnoor.

== See also ==
- Chicken's neck, disambiguation
- Siliguri Corridor, India's perceived chicken neck corridor
- Bangladesh's Chicken neck corridors
