= Chumik Kangri =

Mountain peak in Pakistan

- Location within Karakoram Location within Gilgit Baltistan

Highest point
- Elevation: 6,754 m (22,159 ft)
- Coordinates: 35°12′34″N 76°59′30″E

Geography
- Location: Gilgit-Baltistan, Pakistan

Climbing
- First ascent: Polish climbers Michał Czech, Wadim Jabłoński, and Slovak climber Adam Kaniak

Chumik Kangri (also known as Chumik Point 22158) is a mountain peak located at 6,754 m (22,159 ft) above sea level in the west of the Chumik Glacier.

== Location ==
Chumik Kangri is a key peak overlooking the Chumik Glacier and Gyong La Pass, part of Pakistan's Gilgit-Baltistan territory. Since 1989, the offshoots of this peak are occupied by Indian Army.

== Climbing history ==
No one had climbed Chumik Kangri until 14 September 2025, 8:10 am local time, when two Polish climbers–Michał Czech, Wadim Jabłoński, and Slovak Adam Kaniak made the first ascent of 6,754m Chumik Kangri Peak in the Saltoro region of Pakistan's Karakoram, after climbing the 1,000m south face in a three-day push.
