= Gharkun =

Mountain peak

- Location within Karakoram Location within Gilgit Baltistan

Highest point
- Elevation: 6,521 m (21,394 ft)
- Prominence: 1,055 m (3,461 ft)
- Coordinates: 35°05′02″N 76°58′04″E

Geography
- Location: Gilgit-Baltistan, Pakistan

Climbing
- First ascent: Five-member Japanese climbing team, year 1976

Gharkun (also known as Charkun) is a mountain peak located at 6,521 m (21,394 ft) above sea level in the west of the Saltoro Mountains, part of Karakoram Range.

== Location ==
The peak is located north west of La Yongma Ri and south-east of Dansam. The prominence is 1,055 m (3,461 ft). The Line of Control runs across the summit. Its northern flank is drained via the Gyong Glacier while the southern flank is drained via the Chulung Glacier. On the opposite side of Gyong Glacier, in an east-northeast direction, rises 6727m high Gyong Kangri at a distance of 11 km.

== Climbing history ==
In July 1976, a group of five Japanese climbers (expedition leader Haruki Sugiyama) reached the summit.
