= Bilafond La =

Mountain pass, India

- Location within Gilgit Baltistan Location within Pakistan
- Interactive map of Bilafond La
- Elevation: 5,450 m (17,880 ft)

Location
- Location: Ladakh (controlled by India, claimed by Pakistan)
- Range: Eastern Karakoram Range
- Coordinates: 35°23′N 76°57′E

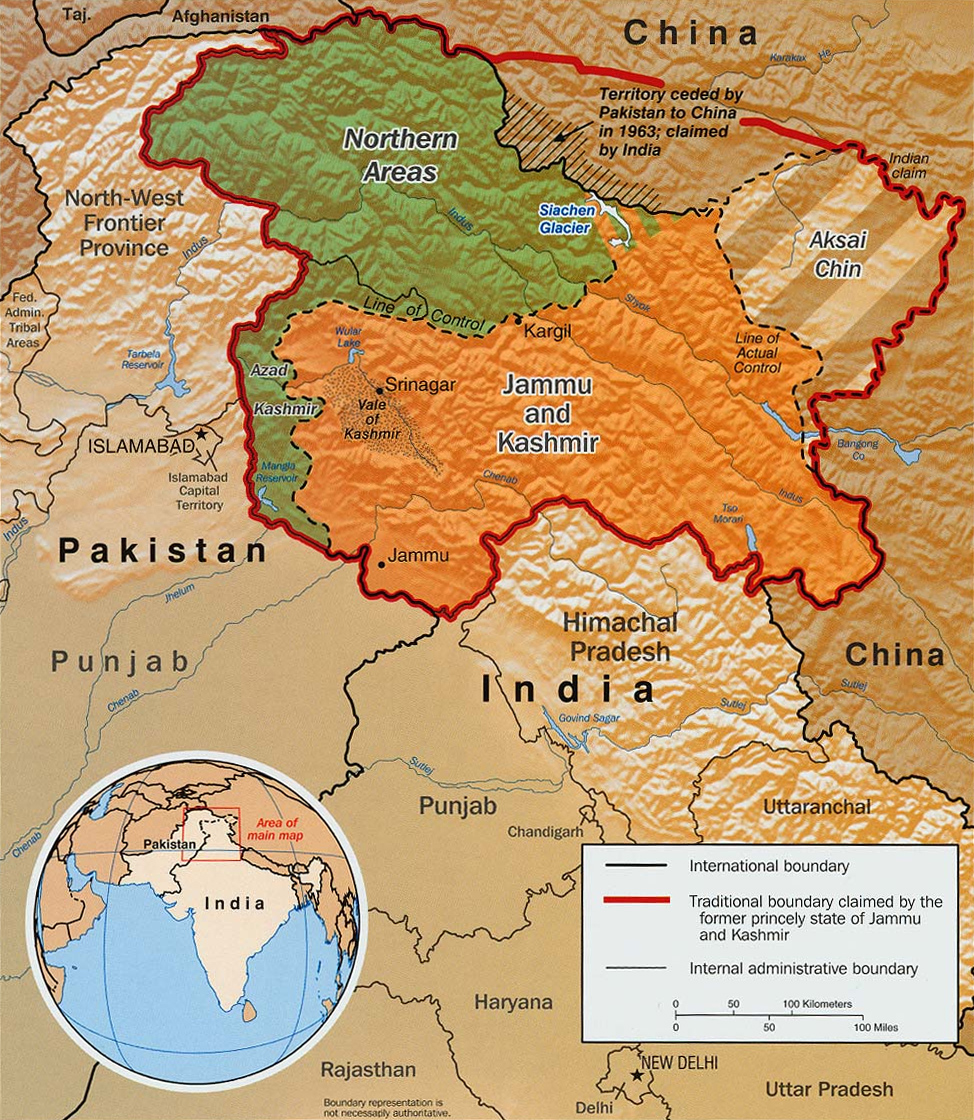
Indo-Pakistani mutually-agreed undisputed "International Border" (IB) in the black line, Indo-Pakistani "Line of Control" (LoC) in black dotted line in the north and west, Indo-Sino "Line of Actual" (LAC) in black dotted line in the east, Indo-Pakistani line across Siachen in north is "Actual Ground Position Line" (AGPL). The areas shown in green are the two Pakistani-controlled areas: Gilgit–Baltistan in the north and Azad Kashmir in the south. The area shown in orange is the Indian-controlled territories of Jammu and Kashmir, and Ladakh, and the diagonally-hatched area to the east is the Chinese-controlled area known as Aksai Chin. "Territories ceded by Pakistan to China claimed by India" in the north is Shaksgam (Trans-Karakoram Tract).

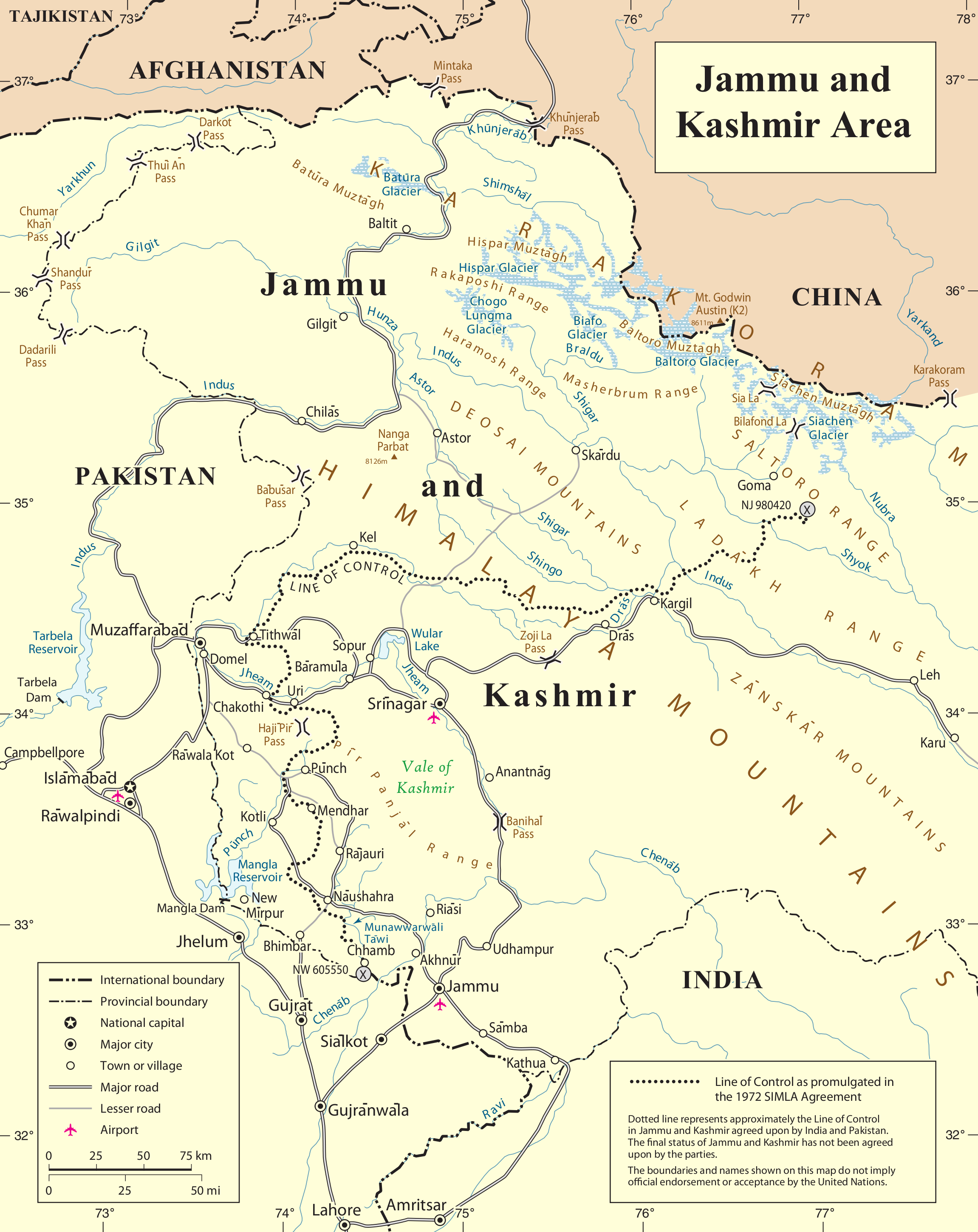
United Nations map of Siachen Glacier showing "Point NJ980420" (Point NJ9842) as starting point of "Actual Ground Position Line" (AGPL), Goma military camp of Pakistan, Nubra River valley and Siachen glaciers held by India; Bilafond La and Sia La north of NJ9842 are also held by India. Masherbrum Range, Baltoro Glacier, Baltoro Glacier, Baltoro Muztagh and K2 are held by Pakistan.

Bilafond La (meaning "Pass of the Butterflies" in Balti language), also known as the Saltoro Pass, is a mountain pass situated on Saltoro Ridge, sitting immediately west of the vast Siachen Glacier, some 40 km (25 mi) directly north of map point NJ9842 which defined the end of the 1972 Line of Control between Pakistan and India as part of the Simla Agreement. Bilafond La is on the ancient Silk Road linking the Indian subcontinent and China. It has been under Indian control since 1984.

The Saltoro Mountains Range, of which western slopes are held by Pakistan and separated by the Actual Ground Position Line (AGPL) the higher peaks and passes are held by India all of which remain snowbound throughout the year, provides access to Siachen Glacier to its east through five passes, i.e., listed from south to north are Chulung La (5,800m), Yarma La (6,100m), Gyong La (5,640m), Bilafond La (6,160m) - also called Saltoro La, and Sia La (7,300m). Bilafond La was a prominent feature during the 1984 start of military action in the Siachen Conflict between India and Pakistan. The Indian Army captured the pass in 1984 along with Sia La to the north and, in 1987, Gyong La to the south. India currently maintains a fortified military base at Bilafond La.

== Geopolitical issues ==
Bilafond Pass, as well as nearby passes Sia La and Gyong La, were scenes of military activity starting in 1984 during Operation Meghdoot, part of the Siachen Conflict, itself being part of the larger Kashmir conflict. Due to the strategic location of the pass west of the Siachen Glacier and near the current Actual Ground Position Line between India and Pakistan, the Indian Army maintains a presence to defend their position.

== See also ==
Near the AGPL (Actual Ground Position Line)

- NJ9842, LoC ends and AGPL begins
- Gyong La
- Chumik Glacier
- Saltoro Mountains
- Saltoro Kangri
- Ghent Kangri
- Sia La
- Indira Col

Borders

- Actual Ground Position Line (AGPL)
- India–Pakistan International Border (IB)
- Line of Control (LoC)
- Line of Actual Control (LAC)
- Sir Creek (SC)
- Borders of China
- Borders of India
- Borders of Pakistan

Conflicts

- Kashmir conflict
- Siachen conflict
- Sino-Indian conflict
- List of disputed territories of China
- List of disputed territories of India
- List of disputed territories of Pakistan
- Northern Areas
- Trans-Karakoram Tract

Operations

- Operation Meghdoot, by India
- Operation Rajiv, by India
- Operation Safed Sagar, by India

Other related topics

- Awards and decorations of the Indian Armed Forces
- Bana Singh, after whom Quaid Post was renamed to Bana Top
- Dafdar, westernmost town in Trans-Karakoram Tract
- India-China Border Roads
- List of extreme points of India
- Sino-Pakistan Agreement for transfer of Trans-Karakoram Tract to China
