= Gyong La =

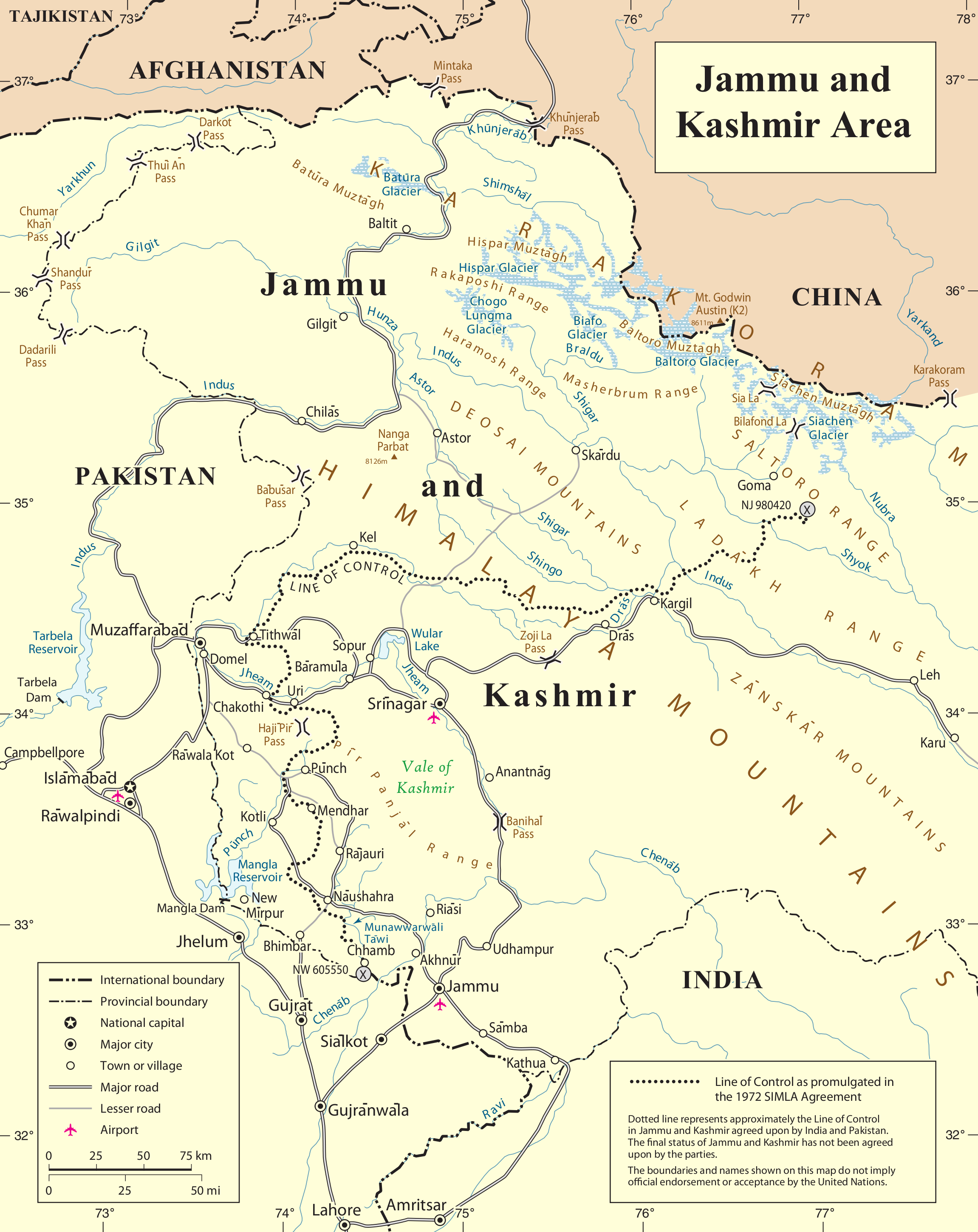
- Starting from NJ9842 and going north, Gyong La, Bilafond La, Sia La and Indira Col West are held by India. Masherbrum Range, Baltoro Glacier, Baltoro Glacier, Baltoro Muztagh and K2 are held by Pakistan.

- Location within Ladakh Location within India
- Interactive map of Gyong La
- Elevation: 5,686 m (18,655 ft)

Third Approach
- Location: Ladakh, India
- Range: Eastern Karakoram Range
- Coordinates: 35°10′29″N 77°04′15″E

Gyong La is a mountain pass situated on Saltoro Ridge southwest of the vast Siachen Glacier, some 20 km (12 mi) directly north of map point NJ9842 which defined the end of the 1972 Line of Control between India and Pakistan. With Pakistan controlling areas just to the west along Chumik Glacier, the immediate Gyong La area has been under India's control since 1989. The Saltoro Mountains Range, of which western slopes are held by Pakistan and separated by the Actual Ground Position Line (AGPL) the higher peaks and passes are held by India all of which remain snowbound throughout the year, provides access to Siachen Glacier to its east through five passes, i.e., listed from south to north are Chulung La (5,800m), Yarma La (6,100m), Gyong La (5,640m), Bilafond La (6,160m) - also called Saltoro La, and Sia La (7,300m).

Dozens of Indian military tents and other equipment are visible at Gyong La in 2013 and 2016 Google Earth imagery 100 meters east, 670 meters northeast, and 2.7 km east-northeast of Gyong La, linked by clear trails. Nearer the former Pakistani "Naveed Top" position and 3.85 km west-northwest of Gyong La is a post and helipad is visible in 2001 and 2016 Google Earth imagery at 5,800 m (19,000 ft) elevation, higher than both the Indian positions and Gyong La.

== Background ==
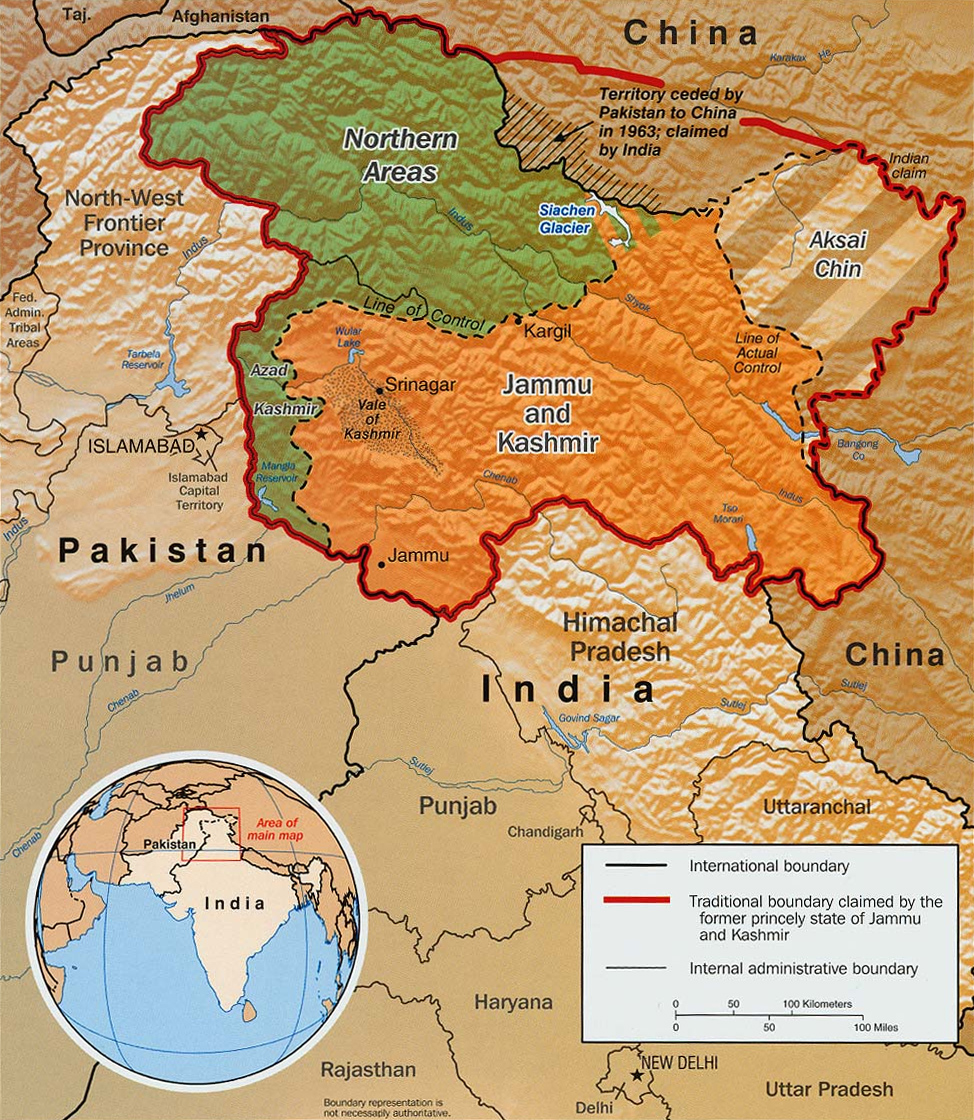
Indo-Pak mutually-agreed undisputed "International Border" (IB) in the black line, Indo-Pak "Line of Control" (LoC) in black dotted line in the north and west, Indo-Sino "Line of Actual" (LAC) in black dotted line in the east, Indo-Pak line across Siachen in north is "Actual Ground Position Line" (AGPL). The areas shown in green are the two Pakistani-controlled areas: Gilgit–Baltistan in the north and Azad Kashmir in the south. The area shown in orange is the Indian-controlled territories of Jammu and Kashmir, and Ladakh, and the diagonally-hatched area to the east is the Chinese-controlled area known as Aksai Chin. "Territories ceded by Pakistan to China claimed by India" in the north is Shaksgam (Trans-Karakoram Tract).

== Indo-Pak conflicts ==
Starting in 1984 during Operation Meghdoot, the first military action of the Siachen Conflict, which itself was part of a larger Kashmir conflict, there was military action at Gyong La, and nearby passes Sia La and Bilafond La. Since 1989 Gyong La has been controlled by Indian forces, with Pakistani forces controlling areas i.e. Gyong and Chumik glaciers to the west.

In March 1989, Operation Ibex by the Indian Army attempted to seize the Pakistani post overlooking the Chumik Glacier. The operation was unsuccessful at dislodging Pakistani troops from their positions. The Indian Army under Brig. R. K. Nanavatty then launched an artillery attack on Kauser Base, the Pakistani logistical node on Chumik Glacier. The destruction of Kauser Base induced Pakistani troops to vacate their Chumik posts just west of Gyong La, and Operation Ibex concluded.

In June 1999 during the Kargil War, the Indian Army under Brig. P. C. Katoch, Col. Konsam Himalaya Singh seized control of Pt 5770 (which was earlier called Cheema Top & Bilal Top by Pakistan, was renamed to Navdeep Top after victory by India) on the southern edge of the Saltoro defence line, about 20 km southwest of Gyong La, from Pakistan troops. During the capture of Pt 5770 by India, Pakistani Army Captain Taimur Malik of Special Service Group and few other Pakistani soldiers were killed. Pakistan had earlier denied the role of its soldiers in Kargil War and had refused to accept its dead soldiers. However, later Taimur Malik's grandfather made a personal appeal to Indian High Commission (IHC) in London for the return of bodies, the request was forwarded to India's Chief of Army Staff General Malik General Ved Prakash Malik who had the bodies exhumed and sent to Pakistan.

== See also ==
Borders

- Actual Ground Position Line (AGPL)
- India–Pakistan International Border (IB)
- Line of Control (LoC)
- Line of Actual Control (LAC)
- Sir Creek (SC)
- Borders of China
- Borders of India
- Borders of Pakistan

Conflicts

- Kashmir conflict
- Siachen conflict
- Sino-Indian conflict
- List of disputed territories of China
- List of disputed territories of India
- List of disputed territories of Pakistan
- Northern Areas
- Trans-Karakoram Tract

Operations

- Operation Meghdoot, by India
- Operation Rajiv, by India
- Operation Safed Sagar, by India

Other related topics

- Awards and decorations of the Indian Armed Forces
- Bana Singh, after whom Quaid Post was renamed to Bana Top
- Dafdar, westernmost town in Trans-Karakoram Tract
- India-China Border Roads
- Sino-Pakistan Agreement for transfer of Trans-Karakoram Tract to China
