= Indira Col =

Mountain pass in Kashmir

- इंदिरा कोल (Hindi)
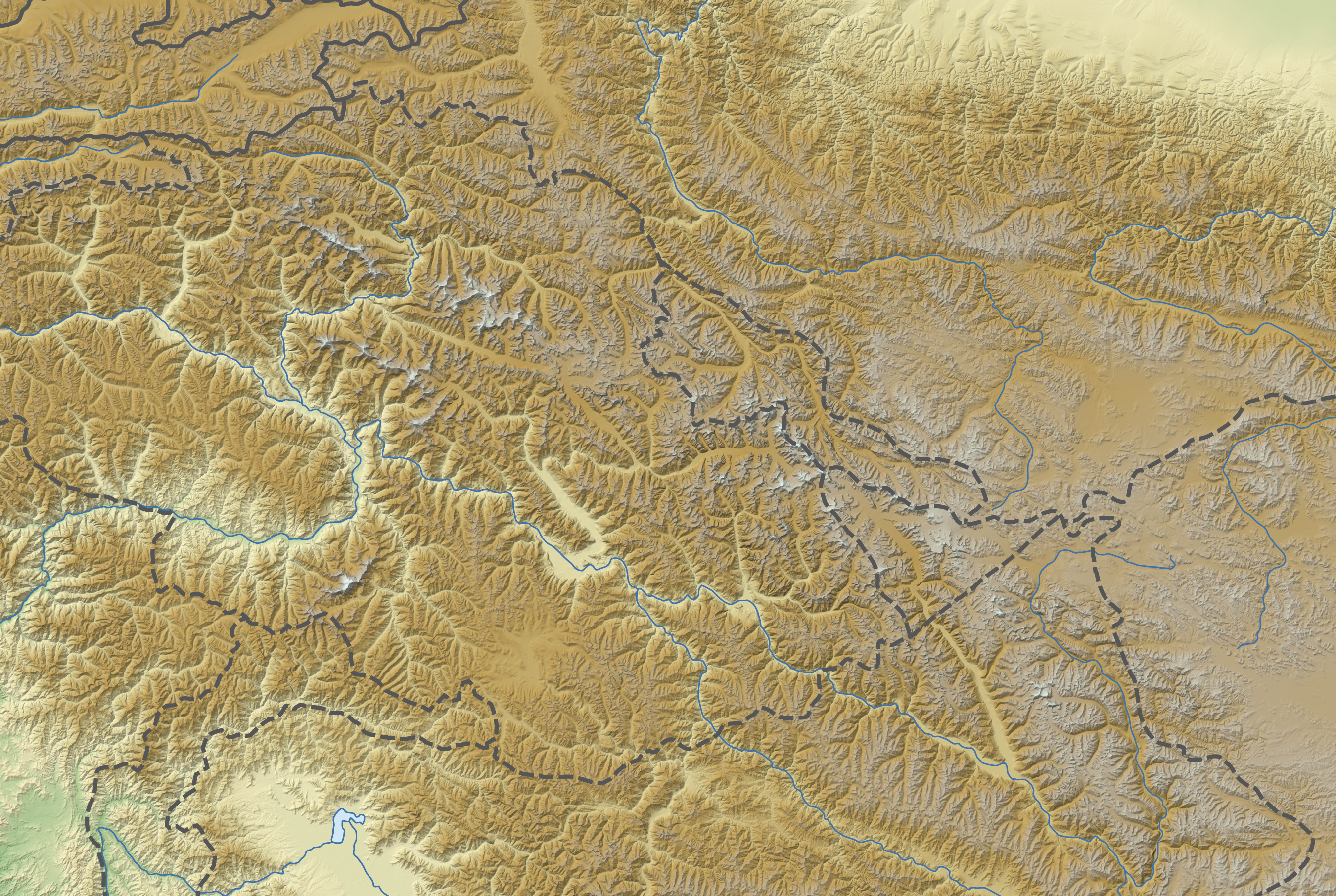
- Location within Karakoram Location within Ladakh Location within India
- Interactive map of Indira Col
- Elevation: 5,764 m (18,911 ft)

Location
- Location: On the border between Chinese-controlled Trans-Karakoram Tract and Indian-controlled Siachen Glacier.
- Range: Eastern Karakoram Range
- Coordinates: 35.6644°N 76.7978°E

Indira Col West is a mountain pass on the Indira Ridge of Siachen Muztagh in the Karakoram Range. It is on the border between Indian-controlled Siachen Glacier and the Chinese-controlled Trans-Karakoram Tract (both in the disputed Kashmir region), close to the tripoint of India, Pakistan, and China. The India-Pakistan Actual Ground Position Line (AGPL) in the Siachen area ends near the pass. It is possible to ascend the pass from both the north and south sides controlled by China and India respectively. It has an altitude of 5,988 metres (19,646 ft).

Indira Col East (Coord 35°39′40″N 76°48′10″E), also called the Main Indira Col or simply Indira Col, is another col on Indira Ridge which lies 2.4 km further east of Indira Col West at 5,764 metres (18,911 ft)) altitude. It is more difficult to ascend or descend on the north side controlled by China, but easier to do so from the south side controlled by India.

India Saddle (Coord 35°39′50″N 76°48′20″E), a geographical saddle, connects the Indira Col East and Indira Col West.

Indira Ridge separates the Chinese-controlled Trans-Karakoram Tract, which lies north of Indira Ridge, from the Siachen Glacier, which lies south of Indira Ridge. The AGPL end point, Indira Col West, Indira Col East, Indira Saddle, Turkestan La North, and Turkestan La East lie on the Indira Ridge from west to east.

== History ==
=== Etymology ===
The la in Ladakhi language means a mountain pass. The eastern col was named Indira Col in 1912 by Bullock Workman, after one of the names of the goddess Lakshmi.

=== Exploration ===
In 1889, British raj army officer and explorer Francis Younghusband reached the base of Turkestan La (North) from north side, and he noted that this was a long glacier and a major Central Asian dividing range.

Colonel Narendra "Bull" Kumar reached Indira Col (the western col) in 1981. In 1998 Harish Kapadia reached the same col; on his map and text he refers to it as the "main Indira Col" and "Indira Col West", whereas he refers to the col 2.4 km to the east as the "Indira Col East (Workman)." Indirakoli Pass（Chinese: 因地拉科里山口） name on the Chinese maps refers to 35°40′17″N 76°50′26″E coordinates is claimed by Pakistan, which is "Indira Col East".

In 1984, Indian soldiers traveled across Siachen glacier, scaled many peaks and passes including the Indira Col as part of the Operation Meghdoot.

After that, Harish Kapadia and his colleagues also explored various peaks passes, ranges subranges and glaciers in the Siachen area.

=== Disputed territories ===
Territories on all sides of Indira Col are disputed. Area south of the Indira Col West is controlled by India and also claimed by Pakistan. North of Indira Col West is Trans-Karakoram Tract claimed by India but controlled by China under a 1963 border agreement with Pakistan. The AGPL generally runs along the Saltoro Mountains range, beginning from the northernmost point of the (LOC) at Point NJ 9842 and ending northwest of Indira Col West in the north, with peaks in excess of 7,000 meters and average low temperatures around minus 50 Celsius. India gained control of 985 square miles (2,550 km^{2}) of disputed territory in 1984 because of its military operations in Siachen.

== Geography ==
=== India-China-Pakistan borders ===
Indira Col is near the tri-junction of India-China-Pakistan controlled areas.

=== Indira Ridge's features ===
Indira Ridge, from west to east, has following features:

- Sia Kangri,
- Indira Col West ,
- India Saddle ,
- Indira Col East,
- Turkestan La (North) (Younghusband) (Chinese: 图尔吉斯坦拉山口, coordinates 35°39′24″N 76°51′38″E) which was identified by the British explorer Younghusband, and
- Turkestan La (East) (traditional) (coordinates 35°39′00″N 76°51′35″E) which is an ancient or "traditional" pass.

=== AGPL end point ===
- AGPL end point,

=== India Saddle ===
Between Indira Col West and Indira Col East is India Saddle between the Siachen Glacier to the south and the Urdok Glacier to the north in the Shaksgam (Trans-Karakoram Tract), on the watershed between the Indus River basin and the Tarim Basin. It is too steep to easily descend north from the col to the Urdok Glacier.

=== Siachen Glacier's topography ===
The main channel of Siachen Glacier, which flows from north to south into India, begins from the southern slope of Indira Col West. The Urdok Glacier, which flows from south to north into Trans-Karakoram Tract held by China, begins from the northern slope of Indira Col West, its subbranches Urdok I glacier flows from north to northwest from the northern slope of India Col East and Urdok II glacier flows north to northwest from the northern slope of Turkmenistan La North.

Straghar Glacier runs perpendicular to the Indira Ridge on the eastern side of the ridge (and serves as the LAC between Trans-Karakoram Tract held by China and Daulat Beg Oldi (DBO) held by India). The Siachen Glacier is explored from the Siachen Base Camp, reachable via Leh-Khalsar-Sasoma army camp-Siachen Base camp road, to the Station A which is the point where main channel of Siachen Glacier meets the Teram Shehr Glacier. From the Station A, the route goes north to Indira Col West.

== See also ==
Similar

- Indira Point

Borders

- Actual Ground Position Line (AGPL)
- India–Pakistan International Border (IB)
- Line of Control (LoC)
- Line of Actual Control (LAC)
- Sir Creek (SC)
- Borders of China
- Borders of India
- Borders of Pakistan

Conflicts

- Kashmir conflict
- Siachen conflict
- Sino-Indian conflict
- List of disputed territories of China
- List of disputed territories of India
- List of disputed territories of Pakistan
- Northern Areas
- Trans-Karakoram Tract

Operations

- Operation Meghdoot 1984 in Siachen, by India
- Operation Rajiv 1987 in Siachen, by India
- Operation Safed Sagar 1999 in Kargil War, by India

Other related topics

- Awards and decorations of the Indian Armed Forces
- Bana Singh, after whom Quaid Post was renamed to Bana Top
- Dafdar, westernmost town in Trans-Karakoram Tract
- India-China Border Roads
- List of extreme points of India
- Sino-Pakistan Agreement for transfer of Trans-Karakoram Tract to China
