= Sino-Pakistan Agreement =

1963 document establishing the Pakistan–China border

The Boundary Agreement between China and Pakistan, 1963
Agreement on the boundary between China's Sinkiang and the contiguous areas
- Signed: 2 March 1963
- Location: Peking
- Effective: 2 March 1963
- Original signatories: Marshal Chen Yi, Plenipotentiary of the Government of the People's Republic of China; Z. Ali Bhutto, Plenipotentiary of the Government of Pakistan
- Parties: China; Pakistan
- Languages: Chinese, English, Urdu

Full text
- zh:中华人民共和国政府和巴基斯坦政府关于中国新疆和由巴基斯坦实际控制其防务的各个地区相接壤的边界的协定 at Wikisource

The Sino-Pakistan Agreement (Note: Also known as the Sino-Pakistan Frontier Agreement and Sino-Pak Boundary Agreement. Long titles include: Agreement on the boundary between China's Sikiang and the contiguous areas; Agreement between the Government of the People's Republic of China and the Government of Pakistan on the boundary between China's Sinkiang and the contiguous areas, the defense of which is under actual control of Pakistan) is a 1963 document between the governments of Pakistan and China establishing the border between the two countries in the disputed Kashmir region.

The resulting border followed the 1899 Macartney–MacDonald Line as modified by Lord Curzon in 1905 in its essence (see Map 3 below). Pakistan also recognised Chinese sovereignty over lands it controlled in Ladakh, while China recognised Pakistani control over parts of Kashmir it administered. However, Indian writers have insisted that in this transaction, Pakistan ceded approximately 5,300 km^{2} (2,050 sq mi) of territory to China, while Pakistani writers maintain that Pakistan did not cede any area under its control, and instead was ceded 1,900 km^{2} (750 sq mi) of territory by China. India claims the agreement is invalid, and claims sovereignty over part of the land. In addition to increasing tensions with India, the agreement shifted the balance of the Cold War by bringing Pakistan and China closer together while loosening ties between Pakistan and the United States.

== Issue and result ==
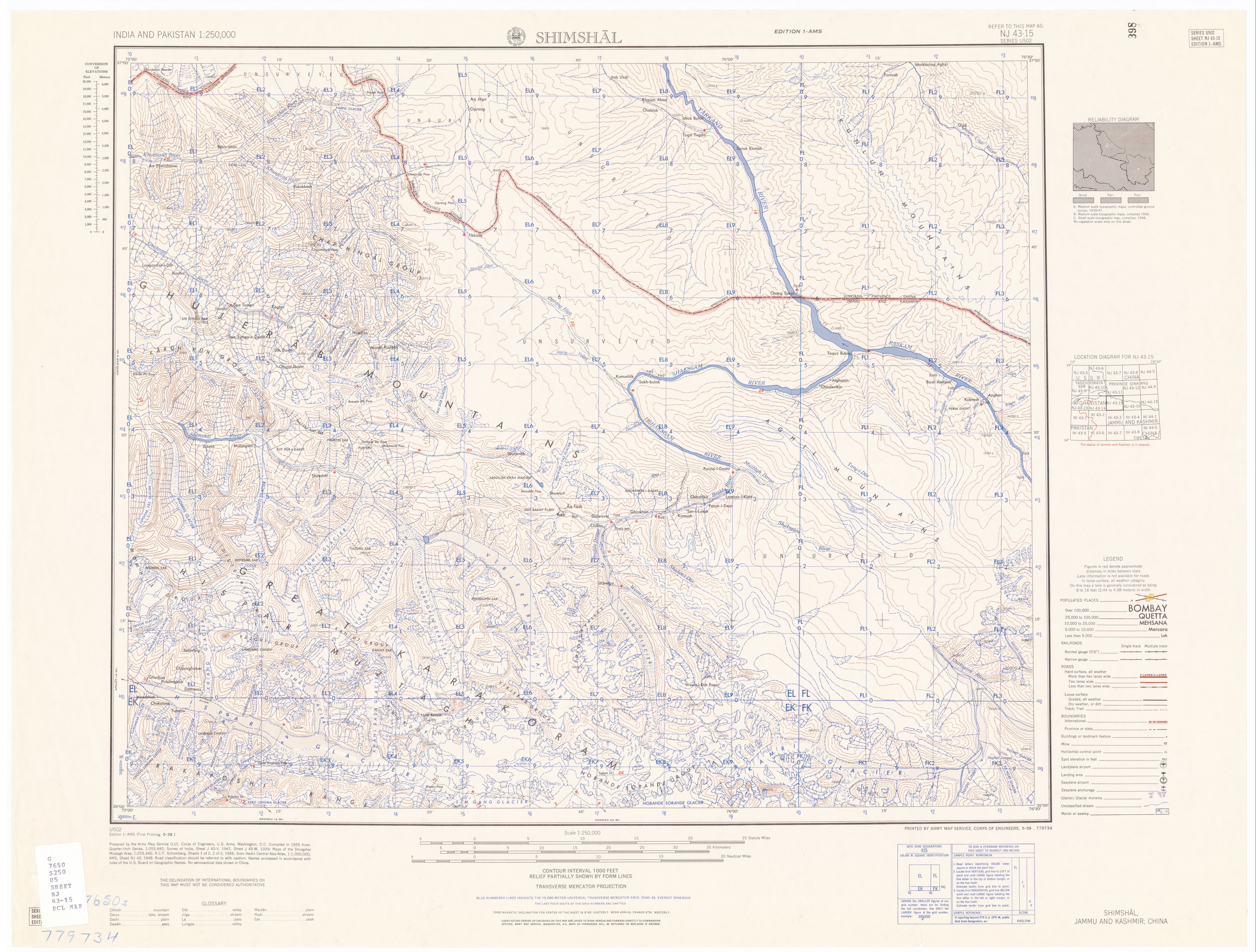
Map 1: A 1955 map from the US Army Map Service showing the border of pre-independence British India near Shimshal. The entire Shaksgam Valley is included, as is the Raskam Valley till the confluence.

In 1959, Pakistan became concerned that Chinese maps showed areas of Pakistan in China. In 1961, Pakistani President Ayub Khan sent a formal note to China, with no reply.

After Pakistan voted to grant China a seat in the United Nations, the Chinese withdrew the disputed maps in January 1962, agreeing to enter border talks in March. The willingness of the Chinese to enter the agreement was welcomed by the people of Pakistan. Negotiations between the nations officially began on October 13, 1962, and resulted in an agreement being signed on 2 March 1963. It was signed by foreign ministers Chen Yi for the Chinese and Zulfikar Ali Bhutto for the Pakistani.

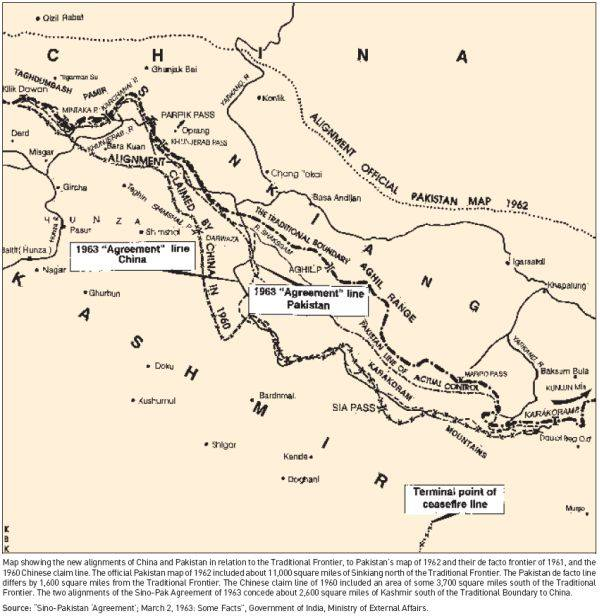
Map 2: Official alignment of the Government of Pakistan in 1962 as per the Ministry of External Affairs of the Indian Government. The border is in the extreme north and is depicted as a dotted line with the caption Alignment Official Pakistan Map 1962. According to the Indian Government, in 1962 Pakistan's defacto line of control lay north of 1963 demarcation by some 1,000 miles square, but 1,600 miles square south of the "traditional border", which it regarded as border of Kashmir with China.

China was accommodating to Pakistan's positions during the negotiations. For example, according to Pakistani diplomat Abdul Sattar, after the border alignment was already agreed, the Pakistan side realised that grazing lands falling on the Chinese side had historically been used by inhabitants of Hunza. Zhou Enlai agreed to amend the boundary to add 750 square miles to the Pakistan side to preserve this historic use. China's accommodating approach in the negotiations was motivated not just by the desire to resolve boundary issues; China also wanted to demonstrate its desire for calm borders, its peaceful intentions generally, and to use a successful conclusion to the boundary issues with Pakistan to portray its border issues with India as a result of India's intransigence. The agreement resulted in China and Pakistan each withdrawing from about 1,900 square kilometres (750 square miles) of territory, and a boundary on the basis of the 1899 British Note to China as modified by Lord Curzon in 1905 (known as Macartney–MacDonald Line). Indian writers have insisted that in this transaction, Pakistan surrendered approximately 5,300 km^{2} (2,050 sq mi) of territory to China (to which they claim it had no right in the first place). India based its claim over the more expansive Ardagh–Johnson Line of 1865. The claim given up by Pakistan was the area north of the Uprang Jilga River which also included the Raksam Plots where the Mir of Hunza had enjoyed taxing and grazing rights throughout much of the late 19th century as part of agreements with Chinese authorities in Sinkiang. However, the Chinese sovereignty over area was never challenged by the Mir of Hunza, the British or the State of Jammu and Kashmir, and by 1936 the British government had abandoned its claim in Raksam.

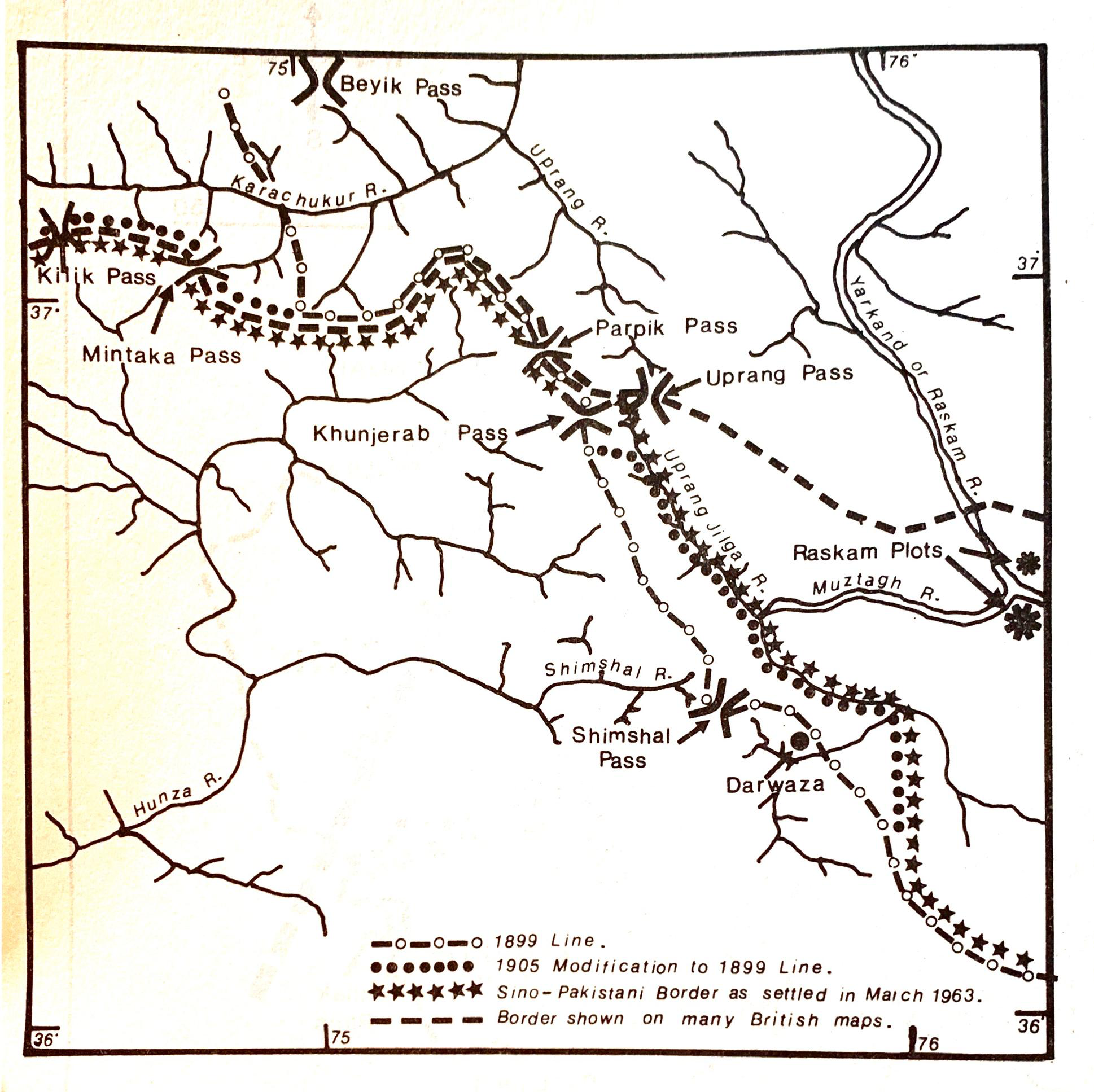
Map 3: Comparison of: 1. 1899 Macartney–MacDonald Line (dashed segments with circles); 2. 1905 modification to Macartney–MacDonald Line (solid dots); 3. The China-Pakistan Border as settled in 1963 (star symbols); 4. Traditional border shown on many British maps (dashed lines)

== Analysis ==
The historian Alastair Lamb, noting the Indian stance in his analysis of the agreement, states that the Indian government has repeatedly used the agreement to claim "existence of a Pakistan-China “axis” directed towards the humiliation of India". He further adds that the western frontiers along Karakoram had been clearly established by the British note to China in 1899 and its subsequent modification in 1905 had been admitted by Chinese authorities in Xinjiang during 1930s, the same border which was largely followed during the 1963 demarcation.

Lamb claims that contrary to Indian claims, China ceded some 52 km^{2} (20 sq mi) of area to Pakistan between Shimshal Pass and Uprang Jilga River which had been placed within Chinese territory under 1905 border. According to Lamb:

There were, in fact, only three problems outstanding. First; the altered status of Hunza, once regarded by China as a tributary state, had to be accepted, even if tacitly, by Beijing. Second: the termination of old Hunza claims to territory and rights north of the Karakoram, which the British had de facto abandoned in 1936, would have to be confirmed, again tacitly if need be. Finally: the precise alignment of the Hunza-Sinkiang border, particularly in the region of the Khunjerab and Shimshal Passes, would have to be delimited. When all this had been agreed, it only remained the reconcile the maps on the two sides (based on different surveys of varying, and sometimes dubious, quality) by joint demarcation on the ground; and the job would be done. A task which the British had started with their Note to China of 1899 would have at last been completed.

The political scientist Taylor Fravel notes that China withdrew from 750 sq mi (1,942 km^{2}) of territory, including Oprang Valley, Prang and Bund Darwaza Valley, Kharachanai salt mines and the town of Sokh Bolaq. Pakistan also kept six out of seven disputed passes under its possession. Sumit Ganguly states that Pakistan gained 750 sq mi (1,942 km^{2}) in return of ceding its claim over 1,050 sq mi (2,730 km^{2}) in Shaksgam. According to Neville Maxwell, Pakistan gave up only map claims while China had to withdraw from the territory it administered. The territory over which claims overlapped covered 8,800 km^{2} (3,400 sq mi). China got control over 2,050 sq mi (5,309 km^{2}) with Pakistani control over the rest. China also relinquished its claims over Hunza. The border followed main watershed within Karakoram, with tributaries of Yarkand River in Chinese and tributaries of Indus River in Pakistani control, respectively, with the exception of Shimshal area where it ran further north.

== Significance ==
The agreement was moderately economically advantageous to Pakistan, which received grazing lands in the deal, but of far more significance politically, as it both diminished potential for conflict between China and Pakistan and, Syed indicates, "placed China formally and firmly on record as maintaining that Kashmir did not, as yet, belong to India. Time, reporting on the matter in 1963, expressed the opinion that by signing the agreement Pakistan had further "dimmed hopes of settlement" of the Kashmir conflict between Pakistan and India. Under this Sino-Pakistan Agreement, Pakistani control to a part of northern Kashmir was recognised by China.

During this period, China was in dispute with India regarding Kashmir's eastern boundary, with India making claims of the border having been demarcated beforehand and China making claims that such demarcations had never happened. Pakistan and China recognised in their agreement that the border had been neither delimited nor demarcated, providing support to the Chinese position.

For Pakistan, which had border disputes on its eastern and western borders, the agreement provided relief by securing its northern border from any future contest. The Treaty also provided for clear a demarcation of the boundary for Pakistan, which would continue to serve as the boundary even after Kashmir dispute might be resolved.

According to Jane's International Defence Review, the agreement was also of significance in the Cold War, as Pakistan had ties with the United States and membership in the Central Treaty Organization and the Southeast Asian Treaty Organization. The agreement was part of an overall tightening of association with China for Pakistan, which resulted in Pakistan's distancing from the United States. After defining borders, the two countries also entered into agreements with respect to trade and air-travel, the latter of which was the first such international agreement China had entered with a country that was not Communist.

== Modification of Treaty ==
Article six states that pending the final settlement of the Kashmir dispute between India and Pakistan, a fresh treaty will be drawn up.

== Relation to the claim by the Republic of China ==
The Republic of China now based in and commonly known as Taiwan does not recognise any Chinese territorial changes based on any border agreements signed by the People's Republic of China with any other countries, including this one, in accordance to the Constitution of the Republic of China and its Additional Articles. However, due to the political status of Taiwan, Pakistan and the PRC do not recognise the legitimacy of the ROC in Taiwan.

== See also ==
- China–Pakistan Economic Corridor
- Trans-Karakoram Tract

== Notes and references ==
Notes

Citations

Bibliography

- Ondris, Peter (2015), Sino-Pakistani Relations from 1960 to 1974 (PDF), Department of East Asian Studies, Faculty of Arts, Comenius University.
- The Geographer (15 November 1968), China – Pakistan Boundary (PDF), International Boundary Study, vol. 85, US Office of the Geographer, archived from the original (PDF) on 11 February 2012 – via Florida State University College of Law
