= Operation Rajiv =

1987 Indian military operation in the Siachen conflict

Coordinates: 35.374354°N 76.953342°E

- Part of the Siachen Conflict
Date	23–26 June 1987
Location	Siachen Glacier, Jammu and Kashmir (now part of Ladakh)
Result	Indian Victory
Territorial changes	India captures Quaid Post from Pakistan (renamed to Bana Top post-capture)

Belligerents
India	Pakistan

Commanders and leaders
(India) Major Varinder Singh (India) Naib Subedar Bana Singh	(Pakistan) Subedar Ataullah Mohammed

Units involved
8th Battalion, Jammu and Kashmir Light Infantry	Shaheen Company, 3rd Commando Battalion, Special Service Group

Strength
75	7–17

Casualties and losses
4 killed	6 killed
- Location of the post with present-day geopolitical borders in the greater Kashmir region

Operation Rajiv was the codename for an Indian Army's June 1987 operation against Pakistan Army that successfully achieved its aim of snatching the highest point, called Left Shoulder (initially renamed as the Quaid Post by Pakistan and later renamed as Bana Top / Bana Post by India), to secure the Bilafond La sector along the Actual Ground Position Line (AGPL) on the Saltoro Mountain Range which is the western flank of the Siachen Glacier. Prior to this operation, India had captured the Siachen in 1984 and established Sonam Post and Amar Post in the Bilafond La sector, and Pakistan responded by establishing the Quaid Post in 1986 at a higher peak called the Left Shoulder (of Bilafond La). After Pakistan fired from the Quaid Post and killed Indian soldiers at the Sonam Post in 1986, India decided to capture the Quaid Post to secure the Bilafond La sector as the Quaid post was a threat to the Indian movement on the entire western Siachen Glacier. Consequently, under the Operation Rajiv in 1987 an Indian task force, led by Major Varinder Singh, launched multiple attacks on the Pakistani troops stationed at the post in an attempt to capture it. After several unsuccessful attempts, a team led by Naib Subedar Bana Singh successfully captured the Quaid Post. Following its capture, Quaid post was renamed to Bana Post after Naib Subedar (later Honorary Captain) Bana Singh, who led the operation. He was subsequently awarded the Param Vir Chakra, India's highest gallantry award, for his courage in this operation. Since then India continues to hold entire Bilafond La sector, including the Bilafond La itself.

== Etymology ==
The operation was named after India's Second Lieutenant Rajiv Pande, who had been killed by Pakistanis during an earlier attempt to capture the peak.

== Geography ==
=== Siachen and AGPL ===
The Siachen area, which lies in a territory disputed by India and Pakistan, is the highest battleground on earth. In 1984, India captured the Siachen area during Operation Meghdoot, and established the Sonam and Amar posts. In 1986 Pakistan established the Quaid Post (also called the "Left Shoulder", Bana Post or Bana Top), before the Operation Rajiv.

The AGPL (Actual Ground Position Line) begins at the NJ9842 peak where LoC ends and AGPL begins, and passes through the western slopes of rides west of Siachen Glacier via Gharkun peak, Gyong Kangri, Gyari, Chumik Kangri peak, K12 peak, Bilafond La, Ghent Kangri, Sia La, Sia Kangri to Indira Col in the north-northwest. To the east of AGPL is Siachen Glacier which falls from the height of 18000 ft at Indira Kol to nearly 11000 ft at its terminus near India's Siachen Base Camp. India and Pakistan have nearly 150 military posts in Siachen along AGPL with nearly 3,000 soldiers each. Nearest road is to the Indian Military Base Camp at Dzingrulma, with 5G mobile and internet connectivity, which is 72 km from the beginning of the Siachen glacier at Indira Col. Nearest civilian village is Warshi in India, 16 km (10 miles) downstream from the Indian base camp on the Dzingrulma-Khalsar Road.

=== Bilafond La sector ===
Bilafond La sector (also called Saltoro Pass, 5,450 m ot 17,880 ft), the site of Operation Rajiv, is a critical mountain pass on the Saltoro Ridge, immediately west of the Siachen Glacier and south of Bilafond Peak, and serves as a strategic point controlled by India since Operation Meghdoot in 1984. The strategically most important features at the higher elevation in the Bilafond La sector in the order of decreasing elevation are the Bana Post (Left Shoulder/ Quaid Post), Amar Post, Viru Saddle, and Sonam Post, all of which are presently held by India.

- Bana Post (also called the Quaid Post, Left Shoulder, Bana Top, 6,553 m or 21,500 ft):
  - Indians called it the Left Shoulder of Bilafond La before Pakistani occupied it in 1986. Pakistani renamed it Quaid Post, and India renamed it as the Bana Top or Bana Post after snatching it from Pakistan in 1987. Bana Post peak, the highest post in the Siachen region, is 2 km southwest of Bilafond La and north of K12 peak (second highest peak in Saltoro range), and overlooks the route from Indian Siachen Base Camp to Bilafond La. In November 1986, Pakistani Captain Akmal Khan taking advantage of bad weather established a Pakistani military post on a dominating feature called "Left Shoulder" of the Bilafond La which they named as the Quaid post in honour of their leader Quaid-e-Azam Muhammad Ali Jinnah, at higher elevation than twin Indian posts, Amar and Sonam posts, with both Indian posts being in the direct line of fire of Pakistani Qauid Post. The Quaid Post was manned by soldiers of the Shaheen Company (3rd commando battalion), a part of Pakistan's Special Services Group. It was commanded by Subedar Ataullah Mohammed. In November 1986, Quaid Post was hit by a deadly blizzard which killed all of the Pakistani garrison commanded by Captain Akmal Khan except one artillery officer, Lt Zafar Abbasi who was lieutenant at that who lost his both legs and hands due to frostbite. Later on, he continued his services with artificial legs and hands until he reached the rank of Lt. Colonel and became famous in Pakistan due to his bravery. The other soldiers, who were from a Special Services group, including Captain Akmal Khan, died on the spot as the temperature hit −40.
- Viru Saddle (~6,250–6,500 m or ~20,500–21,300):
  - It is a saddle, lying closer to and south of Bana Post at lower elevation than Bana Post but higher than Sonam Post. It is named in honor of Major Varinder Singh who was involved in Operation Rajiv in 1987 during which Bana Post was captured by India. It has no military post on it.
- Sonam Post (6,200 m or 20,400 ft):
  - It is located between Bana and Amar posts slightly northwest of Bana Post. It has the world's highest helipad. The Sonam Post is named in honor of Havildar Sonam of Ladakh Scouts who established it in 1984.
- Amar Post (6,446 m or 21,150 ft):
  - It is located south of Bana and Sonam Post on the slopes of the Saltoro Ridge at a higher elevation than Sonam Post but lower than Bana Post. Amar Post is named in honor of Indian soldier sepoy Amar Singh who displayed exceptional bravery during operations here.

== Prelude ==
=== 1984: India's Operation Meghdoot captured Siachen ===
In 1984, India launched Operation Meghdoot and captured the Siachen area, and established various military posts in the area including the Sonam and Amar posts in the Bilafond La sector.

=== 1986: Pakistan established Quaid Post ===
In 1986 Pakistan established the Quaid Post (also called the "Left Shoulder", Bana Post or Bana Top), before the Operation Rajiv. The Pakistani position at Quaid Post at the mountain peak gave them a clear view of the Indian movement in the Saltoro-Siachen area. The Siachen glacier, located about 15 km away to the east, could be seen from this peak with the naked eye. The Quaid Post was located at a higher altitude than the Indian posts was extremely difficult to attack, as it was surrounded by 457 m high ice walls. It had an inclination of 80° to 85° on three sides, less on the fourth side. It was very difficult for the attackers to climb up the peak without getting noticed by the Pakistani soldiers stationed at the top. The scarcity of oxygen made walking long distances difficult, as the troops had to halt every few meters to regain their breath. There were also frequent blizzards, and taking advantage of poor visibility at night was difficult due to the wind chill factor. The minimum temperatures in the area were as low as −50 °C at that time.

== April–May 1987: Pakistani attack and Indian counter attack on Quaid Post ==
=== 18 April 1987: Attack on Indian Amar and Sonam posts from Pakistan's Quaid Post ===
Before the Operation Vijay, in the Bilafond La sector the Quaid Post was held by Pakistan since 1986, and India-held Sonam Post (located northwest of Quaid Post) and Amar Posts (south of the Quaid Post) were at lower height and were accessible only by helicopter. Pakistan's control of the Quaid Post allowed them to dominate these Indian posts, and prevent supplies to them.

On 18 April 1987, the Pakistani troops at Quaid Post started firing with machine guns and rocket launchers preventing maintenance both by surface and air of Indian posts in Bilafond La. Pakistani soldiers at Quaid Post started firing on the Sonam Post and killed Indian soldiers.

=== 29 May 1987: Indian counter-attack and death of Rajiv Pande ===
Consequently, the Indian Army then decided to launch a plan to evict the Pakistanis from the Quaid Post. The 8th Battalion of the Jammu and Kashmir Light Infantry (8th JAK LI) was given the task of capturing the Quaid Post. On May 29, a 13-member JAK LI patrol led by Second Lieutenant Rajiv Pande was asked to identify the best approach route to the Post, and mark it with ropes. The group started climbing the ice wall leading to the Quaid Post, but were detected by the Pakistani soldiers, when it was just 30 m from the top. The Pakistanis opened fire with a heavy machine gun, killing ten Indian soldiers, including Second Lieutenant Rajiv Pande. Before they were killed, the Indian soldiers managed to establish a number of footholds on the vertical ice wall with a pick axe, and had laid a rope to the top.

== June 1987: The Indian Operation Vijay ==
=== May–June 1987: Preparation and assembling the Indian task force ===
For India, strategically positioned Quaid Post's capture was critical to securing the entire Bilafond La sector on the Saltoro Ridge, overlooking Indian positions like Amar and Sonam Posts. The Operation Vijay was conceived to capture the Quaid Post. Over the next few days in April 1987, the 8 JAK LI assembled a new task force led by Major Varinder Singh to capture the Quaid Post. Captain Anil Sharma was assigned as Singh's deputy. The task force included 62 people, including 2 officers, 3 JCOs and 57 soldiers. The assignment, launched on 23 June 1987, was code-named Operation Rajiv in honour of Second Lieutenant Rajiv Pande.

The task force established a base in the Bilafond La area. The 8th JAK LI had taken over the area from 5th Bihar just over a month back, and its soldiers were still in the process of getting to know the area. Because of the frequent blizzards and limited capacity of the HAL Cheetah helicopters, it took 20 days and 200 helicopter trips for the assault team to gather at Bilafond La. To ferry two people and their supplies, a minimum of 2–4 helicopter trips were required. Each helicopter trip cost ₹ 35,000.

During the rehearsals, some artillery observers had to be evacuated due to altitude sickness. A 10-man team led by Captain Ram Prakash was placed at the Sonam Post. He established an observation post ahead of Sonam.

=== 23 June 1987: First Indian assault by Varinder Singh's team ===
On the evening of 23 June, a platoon led by Varinder Singh set out to find the rope fixed by Pande's patrol. The bad weather slowed down the group: it could travel only 1 km in four hours, in waist-deep snow. Due to heavy snowfall, the team could not find the rope, and retreated to the base.

=== 24 June 1987: Second Indian assault by Harnam Singh's team ===
On the night of 24 June, a 10-men team led by Subedar Harnam Singh was sent out. Another team led by Subedar Sansar Chand followed it at a distance. A third team led by Naib Subedar Bana Singh was kept as a reserve force to be deployed in case the first assault team was stalled due to enemy fire. Harnam Singh's team managed to find the rope and the dead bodies of Pande's patrol. The Indian soldiers started climbing the ice wall. They had barely covered a distance of 50 m, when their scout Naik Tara Chand noticed some movement in the front. Alerted by Tara Chand, the Indian soldiers started moving down. But before they could take up the firing positions, the Pakistanis opened fire with medium machine guns. Tara Chand and two others were killed instantaneously. The troops following them were unable to fire back as their weapons had jammed in the −25 °C temperature. Later, the Indians found that the Pakistanis were heating their weapons with a kerosene stove kept below the weapon. Harnam Singh's men first took shelter behind icicles, and then hurriedly dug shallow trenches in the ice. The Indian artillery designated to cover them could not be used to full extent, as there was danger of them being hurt. Ultimately, the attack had to be abandoned.

The wounded soldiers were later brought to the base, and evacuated via helicopters. Their reliefs were dispatched promptly. The Indians also heard helicopters making regular trips on the Pakistani side. While bringing the bodies of their two dead colleagues to the base, the Indians also discovered the bodies of Rajiv Pande and Naib Subedar Hem Raj. Although the two had been killed a month earlier, their bodies had been preserved in the ice.

=== 25 June 1987: Third Indian assault by Sansar Chand's team ===
On the night of 25–26 June, Subedar Sansar Chand's team led the attack on the Quaid Post, with the remainder of the force following at a distance. The team advanced towards the Post, supported by the medium machine gun fire from the Garden post and rocket launcher fire from the post established by Ram Prakash ahead of the Sonam post. Other support teams with light machine guns had also been deployed to facilitate the advance of Sansar Chand's men. However, these guns jammed due to cold weather. The Pakistani side also continuously used machine gun and rocket fire to stop the Indian advance.

Sansar Chand reached near the top of the Quaid Post, and wanted additional troops to rush in immediately. However, the battery of his radio set died, and he could not communicate with his Commander, who was located just 100 m behind him. He then asked Havildar Ram Dutt to move down and reach out to the rest of the Indian team. However, Ram Dutt got hit by the Pakistani fire while moving down, and fell almost 500 feet to his death. His body could never be recovered. Once again, the attack had to be abandoned in absence of additional fire support.

=== 26 June 1987: Final Indian assault and capture of Quaid Post by Bana Singh's team ===
By the morning of 26 June, both Indian and Pakistani soldiers had nearly run out of supplies, having spent three nights in extremely cold weather. The Quaid Post was held by 7-to-17 Pakistani soldiers at the time. The Pakistani troops seemed to be running low on ammunition, as firing from their side had reduced considerably. By this time, the weather had also improved, with the temperatures just below 0 °C. The Indians' weapons had started working.

Realizing that the supplies would not last until night, Varinder decided to launch a decisive daytime attack from two sides. The first team comprised 8 men, and was led by Varinder Singh. The second team comprised 5 men, and was led by Naib Subedar Bana Singh. The brigade commander Brigadier Chandan Nugyal contacted Varinder over radio, and promised him fire support from every Indian artillery gun in the range. After a massive artillery barrage, Varinder's team outflanked Quaid from below.

The team led by Bana Singh launched the final assault at 1330 hours on 26 June 1987. Beside Bana Singh, the group included Riflemen Chuni Lal, Laxman Das, Om Raj and Kashmir Chand. This team approached the Quaid Post from an unexpected direction, using a longer and more difficult approach. There was a blizzard, resulting in poor visibility, which gave cover to the Indian soldiers. Bana Singh's team reached the top of the peak, and found that there was a single Pakistani bunker. They approached the bunker from behind, but realized that their rifles were jammed. Bana Singh then lobbed a grenade into the bunker and closed the door, killing those inside. The two sides also got involved in a hand-to-hand combat, in which the Indian soldiers bayoneted some of the Pakistani soldiers outside the bunker. A few Pakistani soldiers jumped off the peak. Later, the Indians found six dead bodies of Pakistani soldiers.

The Indian Army finally gained control of the post. Varinder Singh was severely wounded by an artillery shell after the post was captured. "On the night of 23 June 1987, the [Indian] assault team under Major Varinder Singh managed to make an approach adopting the most difficult route to the 700 feet high vertical ice-wall on the Saltoro Ridge, and next night negotiated the ice wall and reached just 200 metres from the top. The advance was resumed at 2100 hours on 25 June 1987 and under intense fire his party managed to capture the bunker after lobbying grenades at 0200 hours on 26 June 1987. It was their third night in the open sub-zero temperature. By 0500 hours, Major Varinder Singh's assault team captured the second bunker after firing twenty rounds of 84 M M Rocket Launcher. He pressed on the attack, providing supporting fire cover while a small party led by Naib Subedar Bana Singh crawled to the last bunker and after a ferocious charge captured it. While mopping up operations were in progress, there was a heavy artillery shelling by the adversary's troops in which the officer was badly wounded. Undeterred by his wounds, Major Varinder Singh assumed control of the Area Top by 1600 hours on 26 June 1987, thus regaining tactical superiority over the adversary. Major Varinder Singh displayed conspicuous courage and valiant leadership in the face of the adversary."

In her book, Defeat Is an Orphan: How Pakistan Lost the Great South Asian War, Myra MacDonald wrote:

Against all odds, India captured the post after an operation that involved scaling ice-walls by stealth followed by hand-to-hand fighting with grenades and bayonets at 20,500 feet. On top of the original occupation of Siachen in 1984, the loss of the Pakistani post in 1987 became an added humiliation that dug deeply into the psyche of the Pakistan Army. A Pakistani counterattack on other Indian posts later that year largely failed.

== Aftermath ==
=== Renaming of Quaid Post to Bana Top ===
After capturing highest peak in the Siachen area from Pakistan, India renamed Quaid Post to Bana Top to honor the contribution and bravery of Bana Singh in the capture of peak.

=== Handover of Pakistani dead bodies ===
The Indian Army, after capturing Quaid Post on 26 June 1987, recovered the bodies of six Pakistani soldiers of the Special Services Group (SSG) who were killed during the intense high-altitude assault led by Naib Subedar Bana Singh of the 8 JAK LI. Indian Army handed over the dead bodies to the Pakistan Army in Kargil in a flag meeting, which is formal interactions between Indian and Pakistani military officials, typically held at designated LoC sectors to address operational matters, including the exchange of bodies, under established protocols rooted in international humanitarian norms and bilateral agreements, ensure respectful repatriation of deceased soldiers. The handover occurred within days of the operation, likely in late June or early July 1987, to prevent escalation and maintain diplomatic channels.

=== Gallantry awards ===
Bana Singh was awarded Param Vir Chakra in 1988 for his courage during the Operation. Rifleman Chuni Lal, and Rifleman Om Raj who accompanied him during the final assault, was awarded Sena Medal. Harnam Singh and Sansar Chand was awarded Mahavir Chakra. 7 others, including Major Varinder Singh, 2nd Lt. Rajiv Pande were awarded Vir Chakra.

== See also ==
Borders

- Actual Ground Position Line (AGPL)
- India–Pakistan International Border (IB)
- Line of Control (LoC)
- Line of Actual Control (LAC)
- Sir Creek (SC)
- Borders of China
- Borders of India
- Borders of Pakistan

Conflicts

- India-Pakistan battles
- Kashmir conflict
- Siachen conflict
- Sino-Indian conflict
- List of disputed territories of China
- List of disputed territories of India
- List of disputed territories of Pakistan
- Northern Areas
- Trans-Karakoram Tract

Other related topics

- Awards and decorations of the Indian Armed Forces
- Bana Singh, after whom Quaid Post was renamed to Bana Top
- Dafdar, westernmost town in Trans-Karakoram Tract
- India-China Border Roads
- List of extreme points of India
- Sino-Pakistan Agreement for transfer of Trans-Karakoram Tract to China
