= Chumik Glacier =

Glacier in Pakistan

- Location within Gilgit Baltistan Location within Pakistan
- Interactive map of Chumik Glacier
- Type: Mountain glacier
- Location: Karakoram range, Gilgit-Baltistan, Pakistan
- Coordinates: 35°13′01″N 76°54′32″E
- Length: 23 km (14 mi)

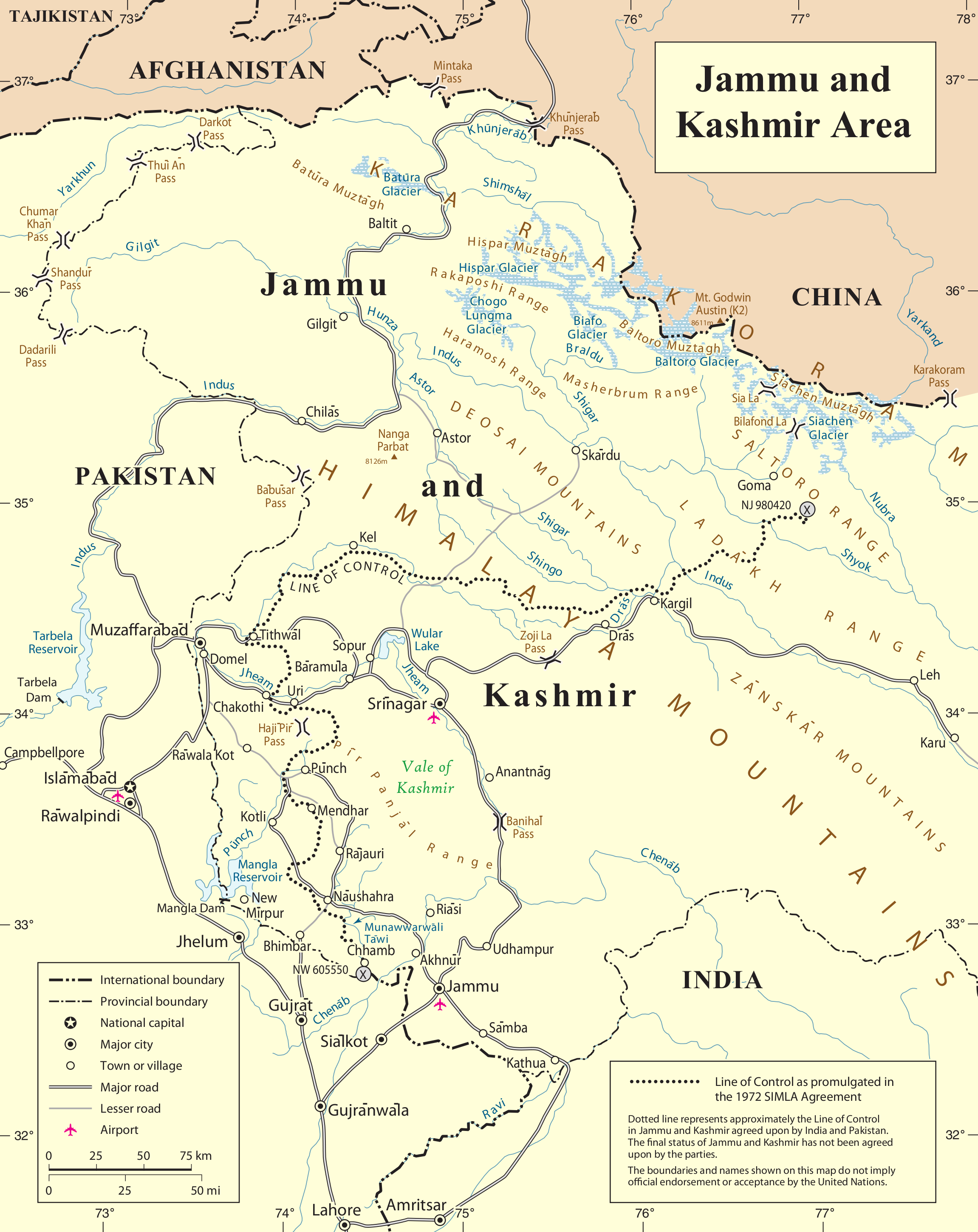
United Nations map of Siachen Glacier showing "Point NJ980420" (Point NJ9842) as the starting point of the "Actual Ground Position Line" (AGPL). The Nubra River valley and Siachen Glacier are held by India. The AGPL starts from NJ9842 and goes north to near Indira Col West. Goma military camp, Masherbrum Range, Baltoro Glacier, Baltoro Glacier, Baltoro Muztagh and K2 are held by Pakistan.

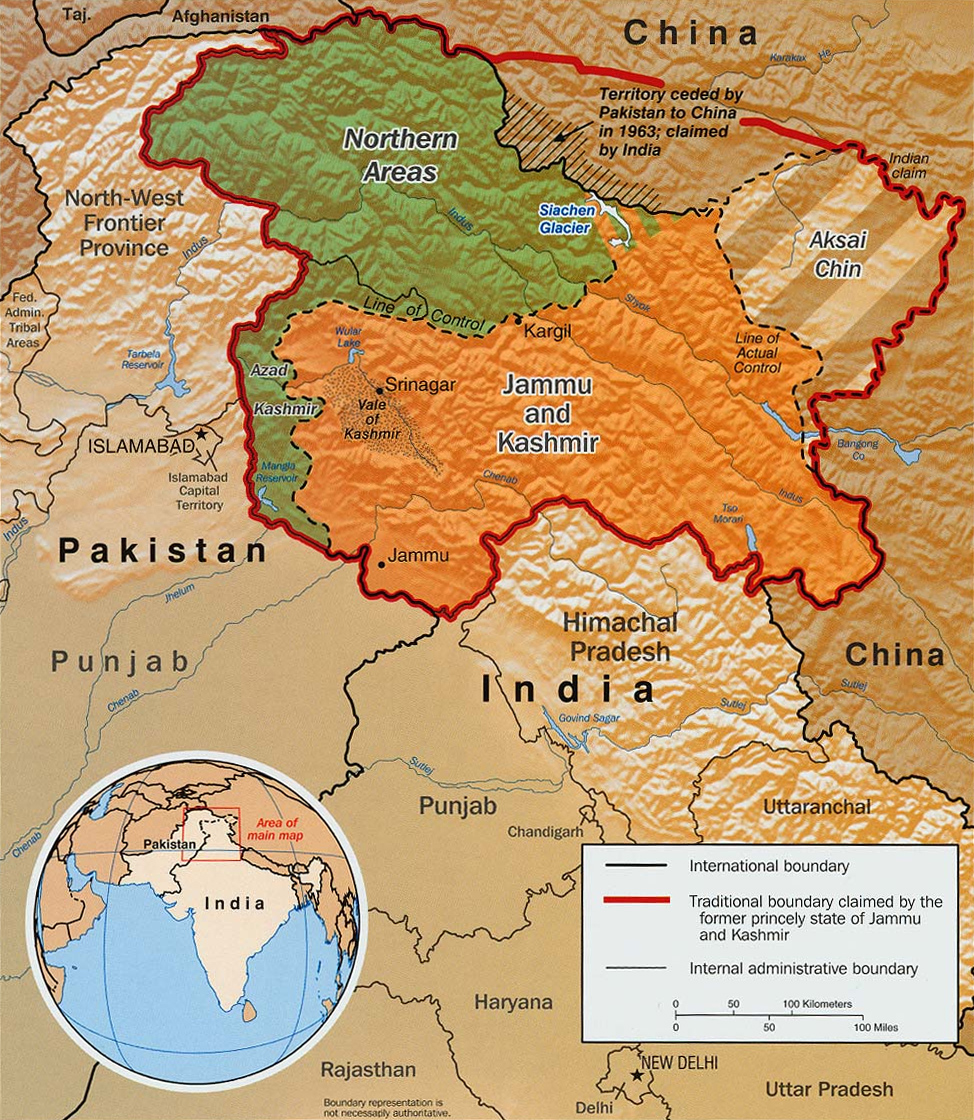
Indo-Pak mutually-agreed undisputed "International Border" (IB) in the black line, Indo-Pak "Line of Control" (LoC) in black dotted line in the north and west, Indo-Sino "Line of Actual" (LAC) in black dotted line in the east, Indo-Pak line across Siachen in north is "Actual Ground Position Line" (AGPL). The areas shown in green are the two Pakistani-controlled areas: Gilgit–Baltistan in the north and Azad Kashmir in the south. The area shown in orange is the Indian-controlled territories of Jammu and Kashmir, and Ladakh, and the diagonally-hatched area to the east is the Chinese-controlled area known as Aksai Chin. "Territories ceded by Pakistan to China claimed by India" in the north is Shaksgam (Trans-Karakoram Tract).

Chumik Glacier in Pakistan is located on the west of Saltoro ridge, it is a 4-mile-long offshoot of the Bilafond Glacier.

== History ==
In military terminology, Chumik is a minor sub sector of Bilafond Sub Sector, near Gyong La.

In March 1989, Indian Army launched the Operation Ibex to seize the Pakistani post overlooking the Chumik Glacier. The operation was unsuccessful at dislodging Pakistani troops from their positions. The Indian Army under Brig. R. K. Nanavatty then launched an artillery attack on Kauser Base, the Pakistani logistical node on Chumik Glacier. The destruction of Kauser Base induced Pakistani troops to vacate their Chumik posts just west of Gyong La, and Operation Ibex concluded. Chumik Glacier to this day is under the control of Pakistani forces, the Pakistani forces are stationed on a post called "Sher Post" which is perched on a ridge at the head of the Chumik Glacier at 19,000 feet.

== See also ==
Near the AGPL (Actual Ground Position Line)

- NJ9842, LoC ends and AGPL begins
- Gyong La
- Saltoro Mountains
- Saltoro Kangri
- Ghent Kangri
- Bilafond La
- Sia La
- Indira Col, AGPL ends at LAC
- Chumik Kangri

Borders

- Actual Ground Position Line (AGPL)
- India–Pakistan International Border (IB)
- Line of Control (LoC)
- Line of Actual Control (LAC)
- Sir Creek (SC)
- Borders of China
- Borders of India
- Borders of Pakistan

Conflicts

- Kashmir conflict
- Siachen conflict
- Sino-Indian conflict
- List of disputed territories of China
- List of disputed territories of India
- List of disputed territories of Pakistan
- Gilgit Baltistan
- Trans-Karakoram Tract

Operations

- Operation Meghdoot, by India
- Operation Rajiv, by India
- Operation Safed Sagar, by India

Other related topics

- Awards and decorations of the Indian Armed Forces
- Bana Singh, after whom Quaid Post was renamed to Bana Top
- Dafdar, westernmost town in Trans-Karakoram Tract
- India-China Border Roads
- Sino-Pakistan Agreement for transfer of Trans-Karakoram Tract to China
