= Varinder Singh =

Varinder Singh may refer to:

- Varinder Singh (field hockey) (1947–2022), Indian field hockey player
- Varinder Singh (soldier) (1955–2012), Indian soldier
- Varinder Singh Bajwa, Indian politician
- Varinder Singh Ghuman, Indian bodybuilder
- Varinder Singh Dhillon, Indian-Canadian politician
