= Chuni Lal =

Indian soldier

Naib Subedar Chuni Lal AC, VrC, SM
- Born: Chuni Lal; 6 March 1968; Bhaderwah, Jammu and Kashmir, India
- Died: 24 June 2007 (aged 39); Kupwara district, Jammu and Kashmir, India
- Military career
- Branch: Indian Army
- Service years: 1984–2007
- Rank: Naib Subedar
- Service number: JC-593527
- Unit: 8th Jammu and Kashmir Light Infantry battalion
- Conflicts: Siachen Conflict; Operation Meghdoot; Operation Rajiv; Kargil War; Operation Vijay; Insurgency in Jammu and Kashmir
- Awards: Ashok Chakra; Vir Chakra; Sena Medal (Gallantry)

Naib Subedar Chuni Lal was an Indian Army soldier of the Jammu and Kashmir Light Infantry (8 JAK LI). Decorated with Ashoka Chakra, Vir Chakra and Sena Medals, he is the most highly decorated Indian army soldier of all time.

Lal was born in Bhaderwah, and lived in Bhara village with his parents, Shanker Dass and Shakuntala Devi, in Doda district in Jammu.

He was killed in action on 24 June 2007 in an operation in Kashmir's Kupwara sector. The success of this militant flush-out operation earned him the highest peacetime military decoration awarded for valor, courageous action or self-sacrifice away from the battlefield, the Ashok Chakra.

== Career ==
Chuni Lal joined the 8th Battalion of the Jammu and Kashmir Light Infantry Regiment in 1984. Three years later, he volunteered and participated in an operation to capture the Quaid post, which was later called the Bana Top, located at 21,153 feet (6,447 m) in the Siachen Glacier, for which he was awarded the Sena Medal for gallantry. A large number of Pakistani soldiers had intruded over the Siachen Glacier, and Lal's battalion was tasked with ejecting them. A special task force was constituted for this purpose. The Pakistani intrusion had set up positions at a glacier fortress with ice walls 1,500 feet (460 m) high, the highest peak in the area, from where they could snipe at Indian army positions. On 26 June 1987, Naib Subedar Bana Singh led Lal and other men through an extremely difficult and hazardous route. These soldiers crawled and closed in on the infiltrators and cleared the post of all intruders. This operation was named Operation Rajiv and Nb Sub Bana Singh was awarded Param Vir Chakra for courage and bravery.

In 1999, in the Poonch sector of Jammu and Kashmir during Operation Rakshak, Lal fought an attempted intrusion by the Pakistan Army and was instrumental in killing 12 intruders and saving the post from enemy capture. He was awarded the Vir Chakra for gallantry.

Lal also did two tenures with the United Nations Peace Keeping Force in Somalia and Sudan. His unit won a UN citation for valour in Sudan.

=== Final battle and death ===
On 21 June 2007, Lal was promoted to Naib Subedar (seniority from 1 June). Three days later, on 24 June 2007, Lal was in charge of a post in Kupwara, Jammu and Kashmir. Around 3:30 AM, he detected some movement across the fence on the Line of Control and deployed his soldiers to the area. An exchange of fire followed, which continued for almost an hour. Lal and his soldiers surrounded the whole area and searched for their assailants until dawn. Lal and his team were then fired upon by hidden attackers. The team continued to close on to the area where their attackers were hiding and killed two of them on the spot. Two Indian soldiers were seriously wounded in the gunfire, and lay close to where their attackers were hiding. Lal pulled the wounded men to safety, saving their lives. He continued to search the area and saw a third attacker trying to escape. Lal charged at him with his weapon and killed him. An exchange fire from the attacker split opened Lal's abdomen and he began to lose a lot of blood. He took cover behind a rock, continued to fire and did not allow the other attackers to break the cordon. Under his leadership the two remaining attackers were also killed.

Lal had lost a large volume of blood and died by the time a helicopter could airlift him to nearest army hospital. For his actions in battle, he was posthumously awarded the Ashok Chakra on 15 August 2007 for saving the lives of his fellow men, displaying most conspicuous bravery, demonstrating battle field leadership and laying down his life to protect the country.

Lal was survived by his wife Chinta Devi, and three children — a son and two daughters. His wife received his Ashok Chakra medal from the President of India at the Republic Day Parade on 26 January 2008.

== Gallantry awards ==

Ashok Chakra		Vir Chakra	
Sena Medal	Wound Medal	Special Service Medal	Siachen Glacier Medal
Sainya Seva Medal	High Altitude Medal	Videsh Seva Medal	50th Anniversary of Independence Medal
20 Years Long Service Medal	9 Years Long Service Medal	United Nations Medal - Somalia	United Nations Medal - Congo
