= Varinder =

- Varinder Aggarwal British chemist
- Varinder Singh (soldier) Indian Army officer
- Varinder Singh Ghuman Indian actor
