= Manjit Singh (soldier) =

Maha Vir Chakra Recipient

Brigadier Manjit Singh MVC
- Born: 1942; Hoshiarpur district, Punjab, India
- Died: January 2020 (Aged 78); Mohali, Punjab, India
- Military career
- Allegiance: India
- Branch: Indian Army
- Rank: Brigadier
- Units: Mahar Regiment; 11 JAK LI
- Commands: 41 Infantry Brigade
- Conflicts: Operation Pawan 1987, Jaffna, Sri Lanka
- Awards: Maha Vir Chakra

Brigadier Manjit Singh Minhas, MVC was an officer of the Indian Army, who served with the Mahar Regiment and the 11 Jammu and Kashmir Light Infantry. He was awarded the Maha Vir Chakra, India's second highest award for gallantry in the face of the enemy, during Operation Pawan 1987 in Sri Lanka.

== Early life and education ==
Brigadier Manjit Singh Minhas was born in Sikh Rajput family Hoshiarpur district, Punjab, India and studied at the Khalsa College, Amritsar. He came from a military family, with his father and two brothers also having served in the Indian Army.

== Military career ==
Brigadier Manjit Singh was commissioned into the Mahar Regiment on 17 December 1961 and subsequently transferred to the 11 JAK LI. In October 1987 during Operation Pawan, he commanded the 41 Brigade that was among the formations tasked to capture Jaffna from the militant group LTTE, an operation that saw intense fighting and heavy casualties. Brigadier Manjit Singh's Brigade was tasked to establish a link-up with Jaffna Fort, in the face of all-out and very aggressive efforts by the LTTE militants to stop their advance. He personally took charge of the leading elements with just two companies of Rajput Rifles. He was able to break through the cordon established by the LTTE militants, and establish a link-up with Para Commandos based out of Jaffna Fort. For his valour and leadership, he was awarded the Maha Vir Chakra.

== See also ==
- Indo-Sri Lanka Accord
- Indian intervention in the Sri Lankan Civil War
