= Keishing Clifford Nongrum =

Indian army officer and recipient of Maha Vir Chakra

Captain Keishing Clifford Nongrum MVC
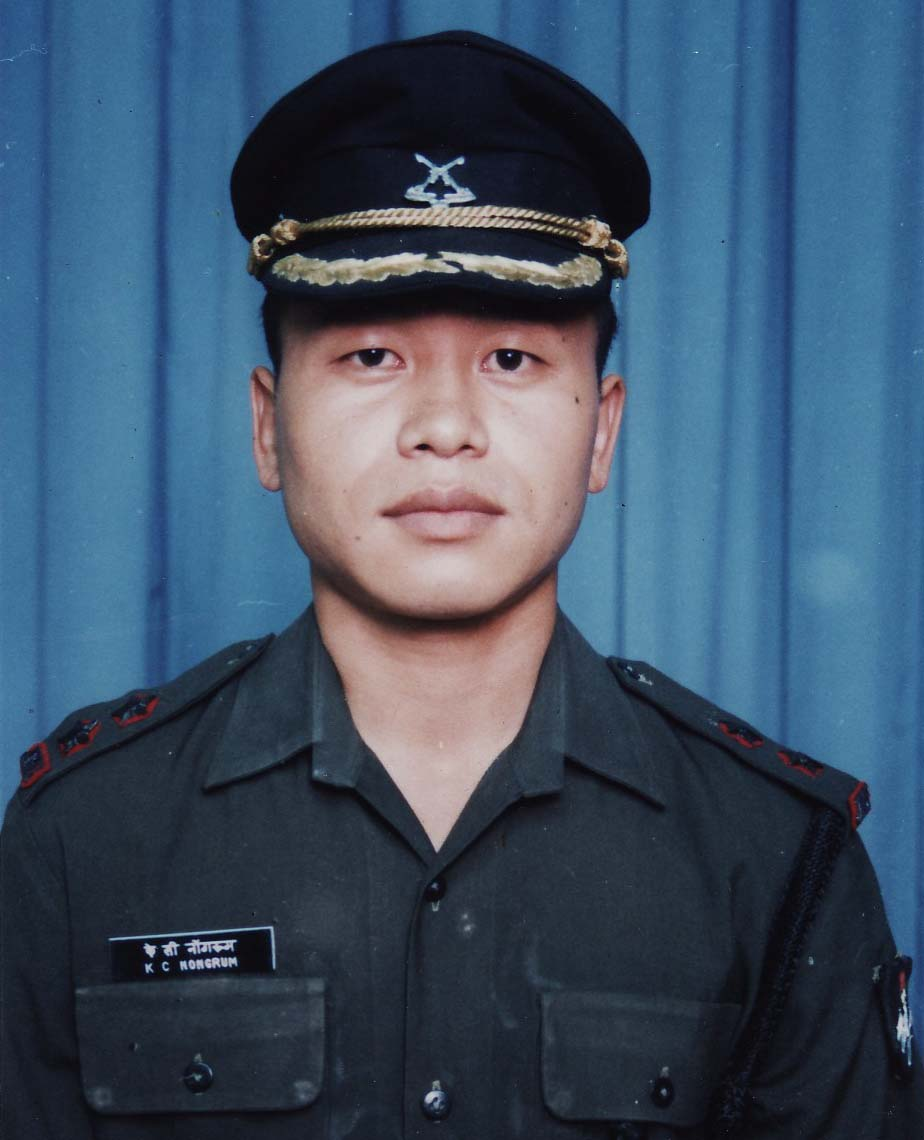
- Born: 7 March 1975; Shillong, Meghalaya, India
- Died: 1 July 1999 (aged 24); Point 4812, Kargil, Jammu and Kashmir, India
- Military career
- Allegiance: India
- Branch: Indian Army
- Service years: 1997–1999
- Rank: Captain
- Service number: SS-37111
- Unit: 12 JAK LI
- Conflicts: Kargil War
- Awards: Maha Vir Chakra

Captain Keishing Clifford Nongrum, MVC (7 March 1975 – 1 July 1999) was an Indian Army officer of 12 Jammu and Kashmir Light Infantry. He was posthumously awarded the Maha Vir Chakra, India's second-highest gallantry award, for exemplary valor in combat during operations in the Kargil War in 1999.

== Early years and education ==
Nongrum was born and brought up in Shillong, Meghalaya, India. His father, Keishing Peter, worked at State Bank of India while his mother, Saily Nongrum, is a housewife.

Nongrum received his high school education from Don Bosco Technical School, Shillong and attended St. Anthony's College, Shillong. He was a bright student who consistently performed well in academics and sports.

Captain Nongrum believed Indian military service has an important role to integrate North-Eastern states with mainstream India. Before the Kargil war, Nongrum visited the principal of his alma mater, St Anthony's College, Shillong to discuss the matter and wanted to speak to the students about the Indian army.

== Military life ==
He graduated from the Officers Training Academy, Chennai and was commissioned into the 12th battalion of the Jammu and Kashmir Light Infantry.

== Kargil War and death ==
At the outbreak of war, his battalion was posted to the Batalik sector. The mission was assigned to 12 JAK LI on 30 June 1999 to capture the strategically important Point 4812 in the Batalik sector. Captain Nongrum was tasked to lead the assault team for this critical mission.

Captain Nongrum was awarded the Maha Vir Chakra for his gallant action in this operation.

The Maha Vir Chakra citation reads as follows:

CITATION

CAPTAIN KEISHING CLIFFORD NONGRUM

12 JAMMU AND KASHMIR LIGHT INFANTRY

On the night of 30 June/1 July 1999, in the operations to capture Point 4812 in the Batalik Sector, Captain Keishing Clifford Nongrum was tasked to assault the feature from the southeastern direction. Captain Keishing Clifford Nongrum led his column over the near impossible vertical feature. On reaching the top, his column encountered strong enemy opposition. The enemy was well entrenched in interconnected bunkers, carved out of boulders, and remained invulnerable to even artillery fire.

The enemy pinned down the column of Captain Keishing Clifford Nongrum with heavy and accurate automatic fire for about two hours. On seeing the futility of own fire against the fortified enemy position, Captain Keishing Nongrum, with utter disregard to his personal safety, charged through the fire zone. Closing in with the first position, he threw grenades into it and killed six enemy soldiers. He then tried to snatch the universal machine gun of the enemy from the second enemy position and received a volley of bullets.

The audacious action of Captain Keishing Clifford Nongrum stunned the enemy giving valuable reaction time to his troops to close in and finally clear the position. Though severely wounded, Captain Keishing Clifford Nongrum refused to be evacuated and fought valiantly till he succumbed to his injuries. This act resulted in the ultimate capture of Point 4812.

'Captain Keishing Clifford Nongrum displayed conspicuous bravery, dogged determination and raw courage in the face of the enemy and made the supreme sacrifice in the highest traditions of the Indian Army.'

—

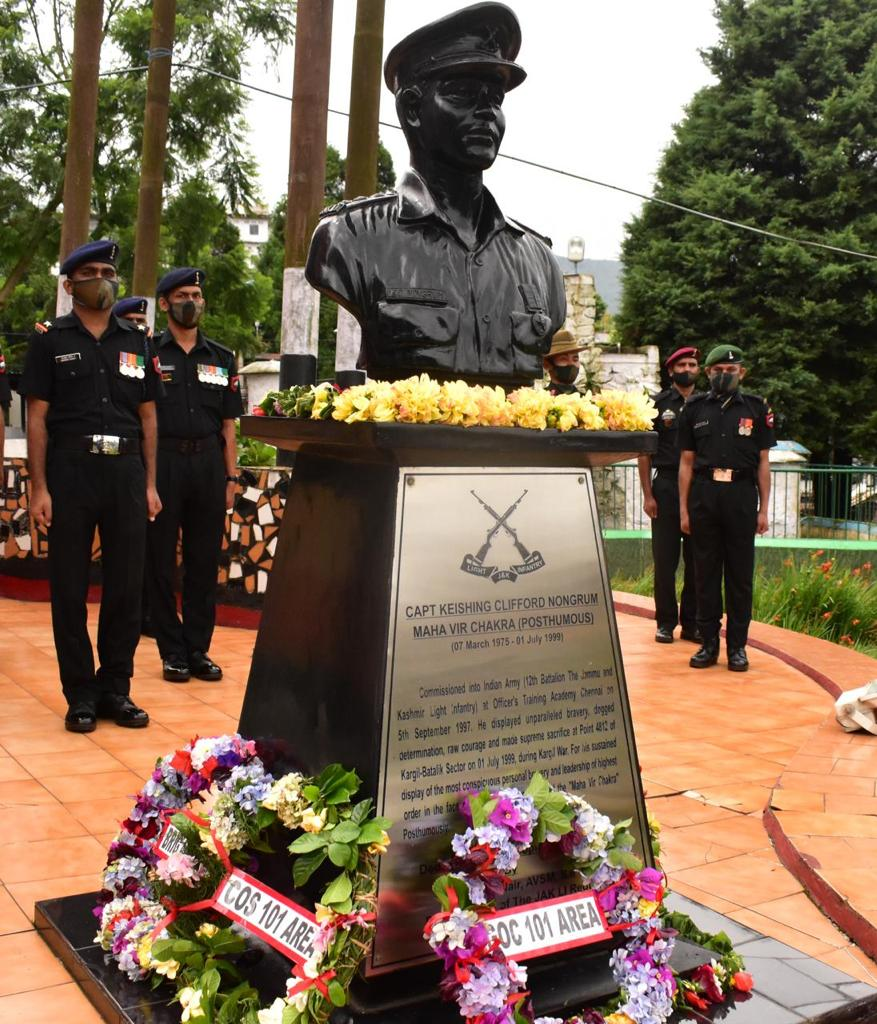
Captain Keishing Clifford Nongrum's memorial at Shillong

== Legacy ==
Captain Keishing Clifford Nongrum is the only person from the state of Meghalaya to have received the Maha Vir Chakra.

A bust of Captain Keishing Clifford Nongrum has been recently inaugurated at Rhino Museum Shillong in his memory.

The Meghalaya government renamed Rilbong Chowk to Clifford Nongrum Square in honor of Captain Keishing Clifford Nongrum.
