= 2016 Siachen Glacier avalanche =

- Date: 3 February 2016
- Location: Karakoram Range; 35.4°N 77.1°E
- Deaths: 10 Indian Soldiers

On 3 February 2016, an avalanche hit an Indian military base in northern Siachen Glacier region, trapping 10 soldiers under deep snow.

== Background ==
On an average, India spends ₹50 million a day for maintaining troops on the glacier. More soldiers have been killed in the Siachen glacier owing to weather than by enemy fire over the years. Over 870 soldiers have lost their lives due to climatic conditions and environmental factors since the Army launched Operation Meghdoot in 1984, preempting Pakistan’s attempt to occupy the strategic heights. The guns fell silent after India and Pakistan declared a ceasefire along the Line of Control Actual Ground Position Line in November 2003.

== Avalanche ==
Ten soldiers died under snow after their camp in the northern part of the Siachen glacier was hit by a major avalanche.

== Rescue operation ==
Lance Naik Hanumanthappa Koppad, a 32-year-old Indian soldier with the 19th battalion of the Madras Regiment of the Indian Army, survived the massive avalanche and was found on 8 February during post-disaster avalanche rescue operations by the Indian Army, six days after the disaster. He was rescued from 35 feet beneath the snow in −45 °C temperatures, six days after an avalanche hit an Indian Army post in Siachen, at an altitude of 19,600 feet.

CT scan showed evidence of oxygen deprivation to the brain. He had pneumonia in both the lungs along with liver and kidney dysfunction. There was no cold exposure related frostbite or bone injuries. He was placed on Ventilator. His health was critical, but news of his survival gave family members a chance to celebrate. Nine other personnel at the post, including a junior commissioned officer (JCO) of Madras Regiment, died in the incident. His family's and the country's celebration was short-lived as he eventually died at the military Hospital in New Delhi due to multiple organ failure. Hanumanthappa died on 11 February 2016 at 11:45 hrs.

Indian news channels reports, depicting the bravery of the soldier. Several political parties and politicians themselves praised the soldier's will that in spite of all odds, he did not lose hope and was finally rescued. Shortly thereafter, Koppad died. President, Vice President and Prime Minister of India condoled his death. Defence Minister of India and the three service chiefs paid homage to the departed soldier before his body was taken to his native village where last rites were performed with military honour.

== See also ==
- List of avalanches
- Environmental issues in Siachen
