= Gyong Kangri =

Mountain peak

- Location within Karakoram Location within Gilgit Baltistan

Highest point
- Elevation: 6,727 m (22,070 ft)
- Prominence: 1,069 m (3,507 ft)
- Coordinates: 35°08′07″N 77°04′06″E

Geography
- Location: Gilgit-Baltistan

Climbing
- First ascent: No records

Gyong Kangri is a mountain peak located at 6,727 m (22,070 ft) above sea level, near the north end of the Saltoro Mountains, a subrange of the Karakoram range.

== Location ==
Peak's west flank is drained by the Gyong Glacier, while the east flank lies in the Nubra river basin. On the opposite side of Gyong Glacier, in a west-southwest direction, rises the Gharkun 6,521 m (21,394 ft), at a distance of 11 km. Gyong La Pass crossing is 4.3 km north of Gyong Kangri. Chumik Kangri 6,754 m (22,159 ft)), which is also on the main ridge, is 11 km north-west of the peak. In the southern direction, the 14 km south-southeast, La Yongma Ri forms the next higher elevation at the 6,828 m (22,402 ft).

The peak act as a marker for the Actual Ground Position Line in the Siachen Area of Kashmir. The prominence is 1,069 m (3,507 ft).

== Climbing history ==
No ascents of Gyong Kangri are documented.
