= Maqbool Sherwani =

JKNC member executed in 1947

Maqbool Sherwani was a National Conference member who delayed the invasion of Pashtuns tribesmen from Pakistan in Baramulla, Kashmir in October 1947. In this manner, he played an important role in buying time for Indian Army's Sikh Regiment troops who landed in Srinagar once the accession was accepted. Sherwani was killed by the tribesmen.

Sherwani was vehemently opposed to the Muslim League and the concept of Pakistan, and had on 25 July 1944 disrupted a public rally of Muhammad Ali Jinnah in Baramulla. Sherwani embraced the diverse culture of Baramulla, celebrating its Religious pluralism. Residents also recount stories that underscore his endeavors to foster unity and religious tolerance.

== Role in October 1947 ==
Maqbool spotted tribesmen planning to invade Kashmir. He misguided them to a wrong path when asked to guide them to the road to Srinagar Airport, thus giving the Indian Army time to land and secure the airport. He was crucified by the angry rebel forces when they realised that he misguided them to delay their march. Nineteen-year-old Maqbool was a supporter of Sheikh Abdullah, and he rallied local opposition against the Pakistani armed forces backed tribesmen invaders. Ultimately, due to his actions, he was apprehended by the invading forces and brought to the Baramulla town square. There, he was commanded to chant "Pakistan zindabad, Sher-e-Kashmir murdabad," which meant "Long Live Pakistan, death to the Lion of Kashmir (Sheikh Abdullah)." Upon his refusal, he was bound to the veranda pillars with ropes, and nails were hammered into his hands. Legend recounts that Sherwani exclaimed "Victory to Hindu-Muslim-Sikh unity!" before being fatally shot by fourteen tribesmen.

Maqbool Sherwani is considered as a hero by Indian Army.

== Legacy ==
In his memory, at Maqbool Sherwani Auditorium and Mohammad Maqbool Sherwani Memorial in Baramulla, tributes are paid by Kashmiris and government officials. The Balidan Stambh monument by Jammu and Kashmir Light Infantry also bears the name of Maqbool Sherwani. Writer Mulk Raj Anand wrote an account of Maqbool Sherwani's story in his novel, Death Of A Hero. Anand's novel was adapted into an Indian television show, Maqbool Ki Vaapsi, which aired on DD Kashir in 2011.

Gopalkrishna Gandhi describes Sherwani’s death as “a martyrdom which anyone — Hindu, Sikh, Muslim, or any other — can be proud”. Yogendra Yadav compares Syed Adil Hussain Shah, a 29-year-old pony ride operator who died during Pahalgam terror attack with Sherwani. Shah was the sole local among the 26 victims of the Pahalgam terror attack and was reportedly killed while attempting to shield the Hindu tourists he had transported on horseback by confronting the militants.

== See also ==
- Indo-Pakistani War of 1947–1948
- Instrument of Accession (Jammu and Kashmir)
- Mohammad Usman
- Rajinder Singh (brigadier)
- Abdul Hamid (soldier)
- Jammu & Kashmir National Conference
- Jammu and Kashmir (princely state)#End of the princely state
- Kashmir conflict#Accession
