= Jammu and Kashmir Light Infantry =

Regiment of the Indian Army

- Regimental Insignia of the Jammu and Kashmir Light Infantry
- Active: 1947–present
- Country: India
- Branch: Indian Army
- Type: Light infantry
- Size: 15 battalions
- Garrison/HQ: Rangreth, Srinagar
- Nickname: JAK LI
- Motto: Balidanam Vir Lakshanam (Sacrifice is a characteristic of the Brave)
- War Cry: Bharat Mata Ki Jai (Victory to Mother India)
- Decorations: 1 Param Vir Chakra; 3 Ashok Chakra; 10 Maha Vir Chakras; 34 Vir Chakras; 4 Shaurya Chakras; 56 Sena Medals.

Commanders
- Colonel of the Regiment: Lt Gen Manish Erry
- Notable commanders: Lt Gen Satish Dua, PVSM, UYSM, SM, VSM

Insignia
- Regimental Insignia: A pair of crossed rifles

The Jammu and Kashmir Light Infantry (JAK LI) is an infantry regiment of the Indian Army. It was the first regiment that was raised in independent India and was formed by amalgamating various voluntary resistance groups from different parts of Jammu and Kashmir to beat back the raiders in 1947–48. It specialises in small unit tactics for border security, combat operations in difficult-to-reach and dangerous areas – especially jungle and mountainous areas, counterinsurgency in urban steep hill areas, frontline military intelligence gathering, manoeuvre warfare, and reconnaissance in jungle and mountainous areas.

== History ==
In response to the Pakistani invasion of Kashmir in October 1947 (Operation Gulmarg), local militias were raised to oppose the raiders. They included National Home Guards in the Kashmir Valley, Leh Scouts and Nubra Guards in Ladakh, Border Defence Scouts in Jammu, Bal Sena and Banmanush in Naushera, and Punch Scouts in Punch. The militias were a paramilitary force under the Indian Ministry of Home Affairs and operated on the Line of Control. They volunteers were organised initially into platoons and companies in late 1947 and early 1948, and later on into 14 battalions of the Jammu and Kashmir Militia on 15 April 1948. Officers from the Indian Army were posted into these battalions. Following the Sino-Indian War of 1962, on 1 June 1963, the 7th and 14th Battalions of the J & K Militia were spun off to form the 1st battalion of the Ladakh Scouts.

The militias conducted themselves with great distinction during the Indo-Pakistan War of 1965 and earned 3 battle honours during the Indo-Pakistan War of 1971. The troopers of the force felt strongly that they wanted the dignity and privileges of a regular army unit, especially keeping in mind their performance and sacrifice in the recent wars. Keeping this in mind, the then head of the J & K Militia, Brigadier Lekhraj Singh Puar of the Garhwal Rifles, who was on deputation to the Ministry of Home Affairs from the Indian Army, prepared and presented plans to the Ministry of Home Affairs for conversion of the militia into regular unit on his own initiative. These efforts bore fruit, and in 1972, the J & K Militia was converted to a full-fledged Army regiment as the Jammu and Kashmir Militia under the Ministry of Defence. Brigadier Puar went on to become the first Colonel of the Regiment. In 1976, the regiment was renamed as the Jammu and Kashmir Light Infantry.

== Class composition ==
The regiment has 50 percent Muslims and 50 percent other ethnic groups of Jammu and Kashmir.

== Regimental Insignia and Traditions ==
Regimental Crest

The original regimental insignia consisted of two crossed muskets mounted by a plough and a scroll below with the words 'JAMMU KASHMIR MILITIA'. The insignia was later changed to move the plough below the crossed muskets and above the scroll. The present insignia has only the crossed muskets, with a scroll below and the words 'JAK LIGHT INFANTRY'.

Uniform

The present uniform of the Jammu and Kashmir Light Infantry includes a black lanyard on the left shoulder and the shoulder title 'JAKLI' over a scarlet background. They traditionally wear black rank badges and buttons, as the original purpose of the rifle regiments was camouflage and concealment.

The green beret (common to all infantry units in India) has the regimental crest on a scarlet diamond base stitched to the beret. The red and black regimental turban is worn by personnel during ceremonial occasions, parades, on guard duty and by those in the regimental band.

Colours

The regimental colours are red and black.

Regimental motto and war cry

The regimental motto is 'Balidanam Vir Lakshanam' (बलिदानं वीरलक्षणम्), which translates to 'Sacrifice is a characteristic of the Brave'. The war cry of the regiment is 'Bharat Mata Ki Jai' (Victory to Mother India).

== Engagements ==
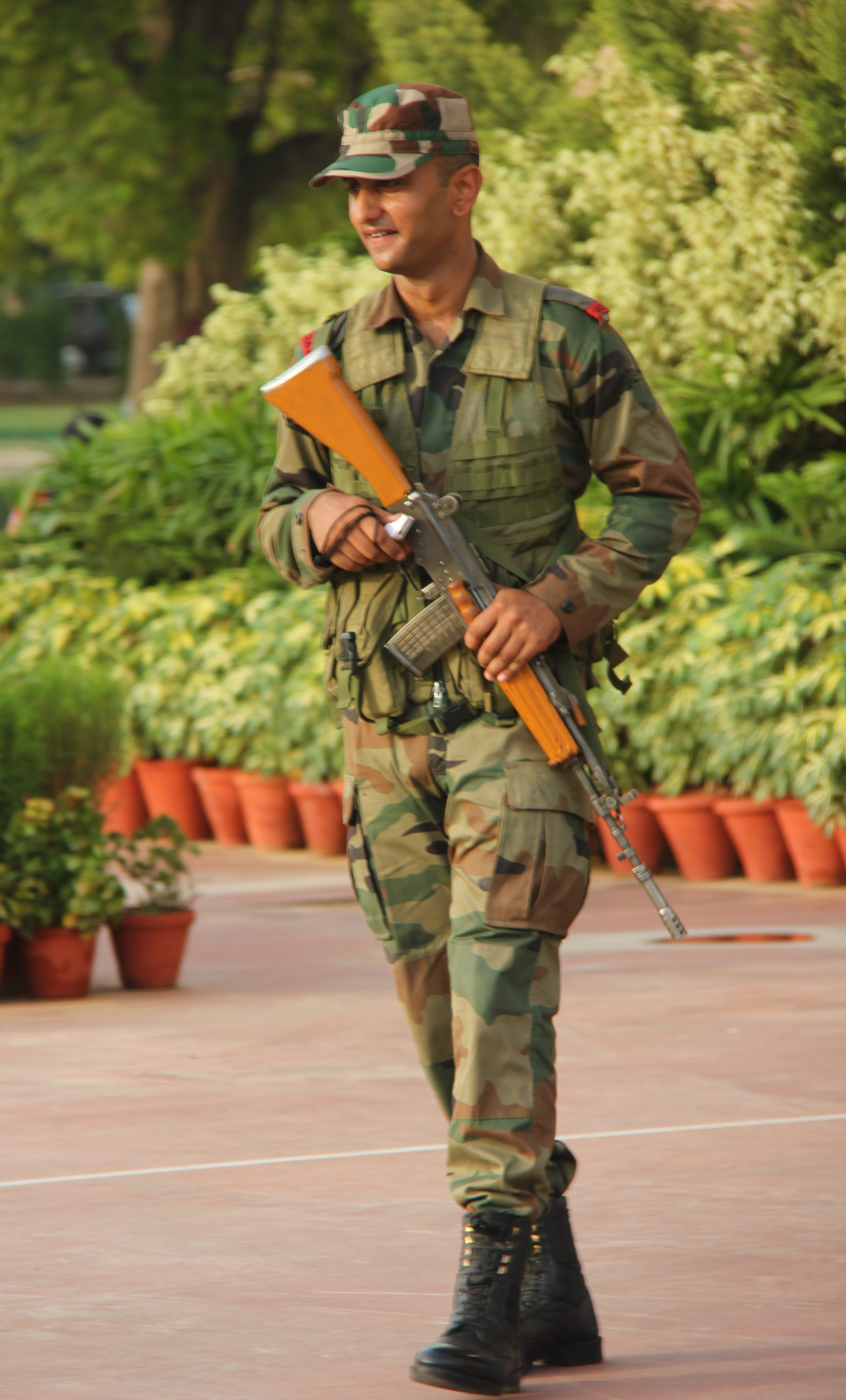
A JAK LI soldier guarding India Gate in New Delhi with an INSAS rifle.

The JAK LI has served with honour in numerous theatres, they are listed below –

Indo-Pakistani war of 1947–1948

The Jammu and Kashmir militia, though outnumbered and under-equipped, displayed remarkable resilience and determination. They were crucial in delaying the advance of the invading forces, providing valuable time for the Indian Army to mobilise and intervene. Their intimate knowledge of the local terrain and unwavering commitment to defending their homeland were vital assets during the conflict. 1 and 2 battalions were under 161 Infantry Brigade at Srinagar. 8 and 11 saw action as part of the Punch Brigade. Four sections of 12 battalion saw operations in the Chhamb area and 7 battalion took part in the defence of Leh.

Indo-China war of 1962

The 14th and 7th Battalions of the J&K Militia were deployed in the Ladakh sector under 114 Infantry Brigade, the former was positioned in the northern part of the sector, including areas like Daulat Beg Oldi and the Chip Chap River, while the 7th J&K Militia covered the southern part. In this extremely harsh terrain and climate, the troops were spread over numerous small outposts with long distances between them. When the Chinese offensives hit in mid October 1962, many of those posts manned by 14 J&K Militia were heavily shelled, attacked and isolated. On 22 October, the brigade ordered the withdrawal. After the withdrawal by 23 October, fighting in that sector ceased until the cease-fire in November 1962.

Indo-Pakistani war of 1965

The units of J&K Militia were deployed in Jammu and Kashmir frontier sectors, including Chhamb, Akhnur, Uri, Baramula, and Kargil. They performed various roles including defence of forward posts, reconnaissance, counter-infiltration patrols and in support of regular units.

Indo-Pakistani war of 1971

During the conflict, the Jammu and Kashmir Militia displayed exceptional bravery and professionalism. The 8 J&K Militia fought in the Chhamb sector of Jammu and Kashmir and played a significant role in preventing enemy capture of strategic ground despite the fall of the Mandiala bridge. It was awarded the Battle Honours of 'Laleali' and 'Picket 707', the 9 J&K Militia received the Battle Honour of 'Shingo River Valley', and the 11 J&K Militia earned the Battle Honour of 'Gutrian'. In recognition of their gallant actions, the soldiers and officers of the J&K Militia Regiment were conferred with a total of 28 gallantry awards – seven Vir Chakras, ten Sena Medals, two Vishisht Seva Medals, and nine Mention-in-Despatches.

Siachen Conflict

In 1984, units of the JAK LI were deployed to the Siachen Glacier as part of Operation Meghdoot. The 8th battalion (8 JAK LI) earned great honour by capturing a Pakistani post at 21,000 feet on the Siachen Glacier in 1987. Naib Subedar Bana Singh earned the Param Vir Chakra for the regiment in this battle. He is the first and so far only recipient of the PVC for the regiment. Major (later Brigadier) V.S. Minhas and 2Lt. Rajiv Pande won a Vir Chakra for gallantry displayed during the same engagement.

Operation Pawan

In 1987, 1 and 11 JAK LI were deployed with the Indian Peace Keeping Force to Sri Lanka as part of Operation Pawan.

Kargil War

In 1999, JAK LI earned honours in the Kargil War. The Chief of Army Staff made a special instant award of "Unit Citation" to the 12th battalion for their exceptionally gallant and sterling performance during the battles of Point 5203 on the night of 10/11 June 1999 and Point 4812 on the night of 30 June/1 July 1999 in Batalik. The overall performance of the battalion during Operation Vijay was exceptional and marked with exemplary valour and grit in the face of the enemy.

Operation Parakram

United Nations Missions

- In 1992–93, the 2 JAK LI was deployed as a part of UNOSOM II, the UN Peacekeeping Mission in Somalia.
- 8 JAK LI was part of United Nations Mission in Sudan (UNMISS) in Sudan in 2006.
- 5 JAK LI took part in United Nations Mission in the Democratic Republic of Congo (MONUC) in 2009.
- 11 JAK LI was part of United Nations Mission in South Sudan (UNMISS) in 2019.

== Regimental Centre ==
The force headquarters of the Jammu and Kashmir Militia was established on 15 April 1948 at Haft Chinar in downtown Srinagar city. This was later converted into a regimental centre. It was later shifted to its present location at Damodar Karewa, Rangreth in the outskirts of Srinagar in 1993. An additional training centre exists at Dansal in Jammu district.

== Units ==
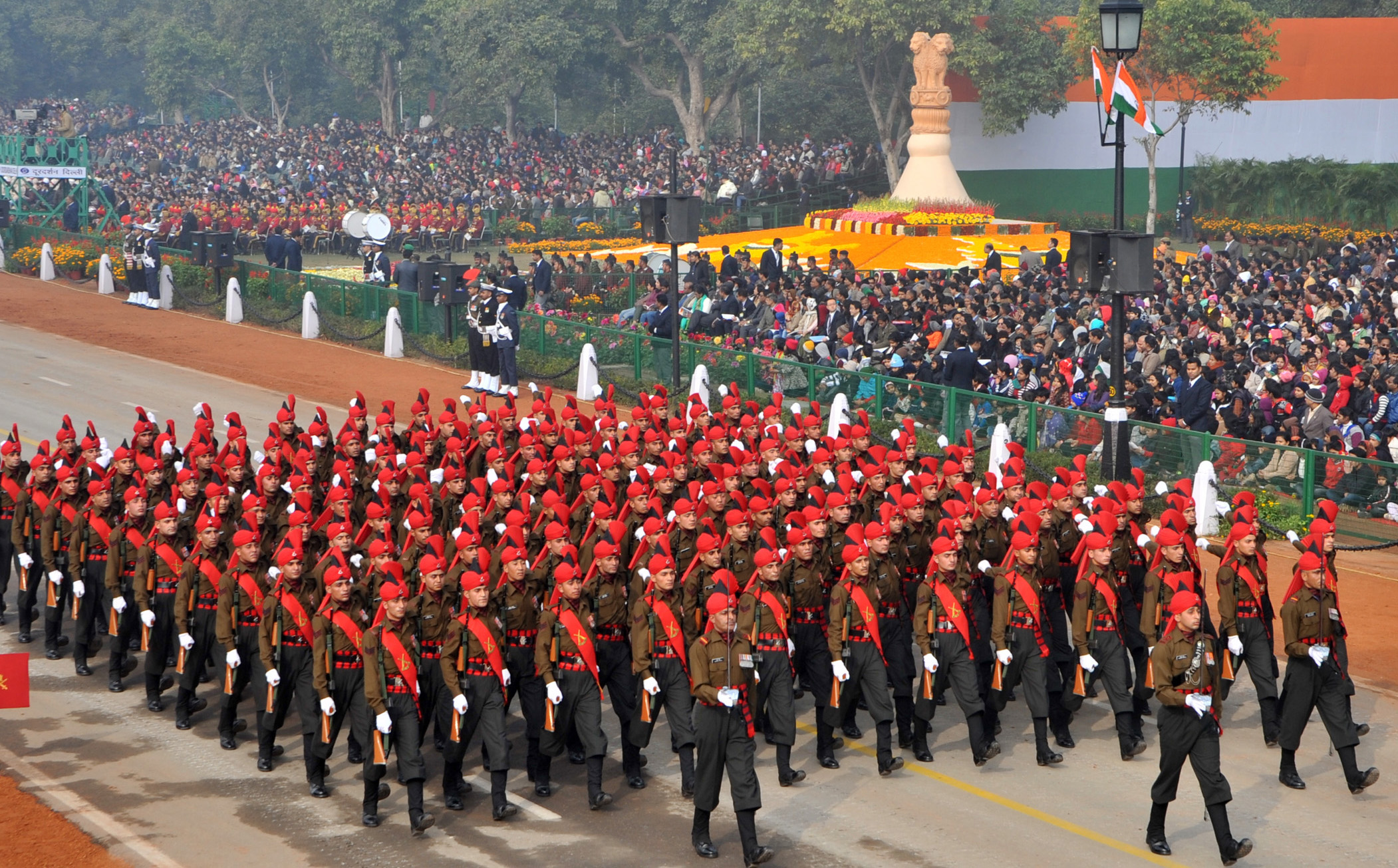
The Jammu and Kashmir Light Infantry marching contingent of the 11th Battalion passes through the Rajpath during the 65th Republic Day Parade, 2014

| Battalion | Raising Date | Nickname | Remarks | References |
|---|---|---|---|---|
| 1st Battalion | 15 April 1948 | Sher-E-Kashmir, First | | |
| 2nd Battalion | 15 April 1948 | Sherwani Paltan | Raised in Srinagar by Lieutenant Colonel Amar Singh from a core group of volunteers of National Home Guards from the Anantnag and Baramulla districts. | |
| 3rd Battalion | 18 May 1948 | Khalids | | |
| 4th Battalion | 1 June 1995 | Fakhr E Kashmir | | |
| 5th Battalion | 1 September 1995 | Ashok Chakra Paltan | | |
| 6th Battalion | 1 August 1996 | | | |
| 7th Battalion | 1952 | | Now 1st Battalion, Ladakh Scouts. | |
| 8th Battalion | 18 December 1947 | Bravest of the brave | Raised as First Battalion, Border Scouts in Poonch. Designated 8 Jammu and Kashmir Militia on 15 April 1948. Re-designated as 8 Jammu and Kashmir Light Infantry on 27 Apr 1976. Theatre honour J & K 1971, Battle honours Laleali and Picquet 707. Distinguished unit to have produced recipients of both the Param Vir Chakra and the Ashok Chakra. | |
| 9th Battalion | | | Theatre honour J & K 1971, battle honour Shingo River Valley. | |
| 10th Battalion | Re-raised 28 September 1984 | Towering Tenth | | |
| 11th Battalion | 17 May 1948 | Gutrian Battalion | Raised by Lieutenant Colonel Kapil Dev Pachnanda at Moti Mahal, Poonch by assorting the sub-units of the erstwhile Poonch Scouts. Theatre honour J & K 1971, battle honour Gutrain. | |
| 12nd Battalion | 15 April 1948 | | Raised at Hamirpur Sidhar from the Jammu and Border Defence Scouts by Lieutenant Colonel Bhag Singh MC. Theatre honour Kargil 1999 and Battle honour Batalik. | |
| 13th Battalion | 1948 | | | |
| 14th Battalion | 1959 | | Now 2nd Battalion, Ladakh Scouts. | |
| 15th Battalion | 15 March 1997 | | | |
| 16th Battalion | 1997 | Solah | | |
| 17th Battalion | 1 March 2003 | Strikers | Raised at Dhansal, Jammu and Kashmir by Colonel HS Shanbhag SM. | |
| 129 Infantry Battalion (TA) (Ecological) | | | Located at Samba. | |
| 161 Infantry Battalion (TA) (H&H) | | | Located at Baramulla. | |
| 162 Infantry Battalion (TA) (H&H) | | Ashok Chakra Paltan | Located at Srinagar. | |

Rashtriya Rifles

- Unlike other infantry regiments, Jammu and Kashmir Light Infantry does not have a Rashtriya Rifles (RR) battalion. Instead, their troops are allocated to the other RR battalions for counter insurgency and counter terrorism operations, as their troops are recruited locally from the J & K region. Hence, they have the knowledge of the local terrain, language (customs and traditions) and knowledge of militants’ modus operandi, which is very valuable resource. They also help interface between locals and the RR battalions as translators and communicators.

== Distinctions ==
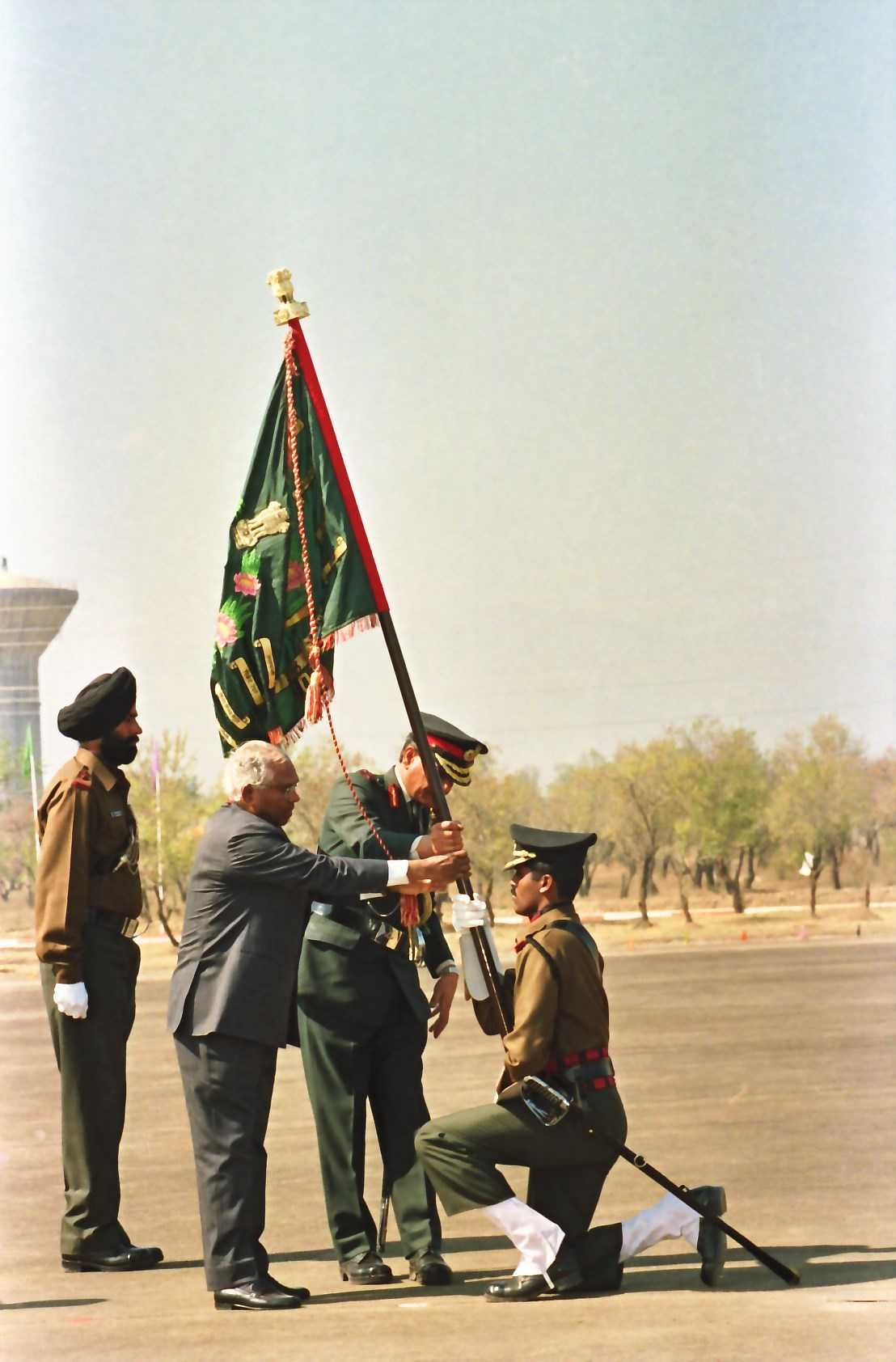
The regiment getting its colours from the President Mr KR Narayanan

=== Battle Honours ===
- Laleali, Indo-Pakistani War of 1971
- Picquet 707, Indo-Pakistani War of 1971
- Shingo River Valley, Indo-Pakistani War of 1971
- Gutrian, Indo-Pakistani War of 1971
- Batalik, Indo-Pak War of 1999

=== Gallantry Awards ===
Though one of the younger infantry units of the Indian Army, the Jammu and Kashmir Light Infantry is considered to be one of the most decorated regiments of the Indian Army, having received one Param Vir Chakra and three Ashok Chakra. Two of the most decorated soldiers are Naib Subedar Chuni Lal of the 8 JAK LI, who was decorated with Sena Medal (Gallantry), Vir Chakra and finally with Ashoka Chakra posthumously, and Lance Naik Nazir Ahmad Wani who was awarded the Sena Medal for gallantry twice, before being posthumously awarded the Ashoka Chakra.

The following personnel of the JAK LI, have received the highest honours for gallantry. The symbol 'ϯ' indicates that the decoration was awarded posthumously.

Param Vir Chakra

- Naib Subedar Bana Singh, 8 JAK LI, 1987

Ashoka Chakra

- Lieutenant Triveni Singh, 5 JAK LI, 2004 ϯ
- Naib Subedar Chuni Lal, 8 JAK LI, 2007 ϯ
- Lance Naik Nazir Ahmad Wani, 162 Infantry Battalion (TA), 34 RR, 2019 ϯ

Maha Vir Chakra

- Jemadar Chewang Rinchen, 7 J&K Militia, 1948
- Major Kushal Chand, 7 J&K Militia, 1948
- Major Thakur Prithi Chand, 7 J&K Militia, 1948
- Major Sardul Singh Randhawa, 14 J&K Militia, 1962
- Jemadar Ishe Tundup, 7 J&K Militia, 1962 ϯ
- Havildar Satingian Phunchok, 7 J&K Militia, 1962 ϯ
- Subedar Sonam Stobdhan, 7 J&K Militia, 1962 ϯ
- Havildar Saroop Singh, 14 J&K Militia, 1962 ϯ
- Subedar Sansar Chand, 8 JAK LI 1987
- Brigadier Manjit Singh, 11 JAK LI, 1987
- Captain Keishing Clifford Nongrum, 12 JAK LI, 1999 ϯ

Kirti Chakra

- Major Pradeep R Tathawade, 8 JAK LI, 2000 ϯ
- Lieutenant Natarajan Parthiban, 5 JAK LI, 2006 ϯ
- Major Vijayant Bist, 4 JAK LI, 2018
- Rifleman Ravi Kumar, 63 RR, 2025 ϯ

Vir Chakra

- Subedar Parma Nand,11 J&K Militia, 1948
- Lance Naik Gian Singh, 11 J&K Militia, 1948
- Jemadar Bhagwan Dass, 14 J&K Militia, 1948
- Jemadar Hanas Raj, 9 J&K Militia, 1948ϯ
- Naik Shiv Ram, 8 J&K Militia, 1948
- Lance Naik Gian Singh, 11 J&K Militia, 1948
- Lieutenant Ujagar Singh Teje, 13 JAK LI, 1964 ϯ
- Havildar Balwant Singh, 8 JAK LI, 1987
- Major Varinder Singh, 8 JAK LI, 1987
- Second Lieutenant Rajiv Pandey, 8 JAK LI, 1987 ϯ
- Naib Subedar Lekh Raj, 8 JAK LI 1988 ϯ
- Subedar Bahadur Singh, 12 JAK LI, 1999 ϯ
- Lance Naik Ghulam Mohd Khan, 12 JAK LI, 1999 ϯ
- Captain Amol Kalia, 12 JAK LI, 1999 ϯ
- Havildar Satish Chander, 12 JAK LI, 1999
- Major Manoj M Deshpande, 8 JAK LI, 2000
- Havildar Chuni Lal, 8 JAK LI, 2000
- Rifleman Sunil Kumar, 4 JAK LI, 2025

Shaurya Chakra

- Major Mehar Singh Dahiya, 3 JAK LI, 1985
- Rifleman Mohd Safeer Khan, 12 JAK LI, 1993 ϯ
- Major Bal Raj Sharma, 90 AR / 10 JAK LI, 1996
- Major Rohit Sharma, 8 JAK LI, 1998 ϯ
- Major Manish Mishra, 5 JAK LI, 1999
- Rifleman Mohammed Mushtaq, 6 JAK LI, 1999
- Subedar Nain Singh, 4 JAK LI, 2001 ϯ
- Rifleman Mohammed Ajaz, 5 JAK LI, 2001 ϯ
- Major Balraj Singh Sohi, 5 JAK LI, 2002
- Rifleman Javid Ahmad Khanday, 10 JAK LI/46 RR, 2004
- Rifleman Zahid Abass Mir, 5 JAK LI, 2006 ϯ
- Rifleman Riyas Ahmad Bhat, 16 JAK LI/35 RR, 2006
- Havildar Abrahim, 2 JAK LI/47 RR, 2006
- Lance Naik Subash Chander, 10 JAK LI, 2008 ϯ
- Rifleman Mohd Abdul Amieen Bhat, 13 JAK LI/57 RR, 2009 ϯ
- Rifleman Suraj Prakash, 8 JAK LI/10 RR, 2010 ϯ
- Rifleman Aurangzab, 4 JAK LI/44 RR, 2018 ϯ
- Lance Naik Badher Hussain, 4 JAK LI, 2018
- Rifleman Shive Kumar, 15 JAK LI/31 RR, 2019 ϯ
- Naik Naresh Kumar, 12 JAK LI/42 RR, 2020 ϯ

== President's Standard ==
The President, Mr K. R. Narayanan, presented the colours to the regiment at its regimental centre on 9 October 1998.

== Affiliations ==
The regiment was affiliated with INS Ganga till her decommissioning in March 2018. In April 2018, the regiment was affiliated with INS Kochi, a stealth guided-missile destroyer and 51 Squadron of the Indian Air Force, which is based in Srinagar. The regiment was affiliated with 223 Squadron (Tridents) of Indian Air Force, based in Srinagar on 26 September 2023.

== See also ==
- Azad Kashmir Regiment
- Jammu and Kashmir Rifles
- List of regiments of the Indian Army
