= Bana Singh =

Indian Army soldier, recipient of India's highest gallantry award

Subedar Major and Honorary Captain Bana Singh PVC
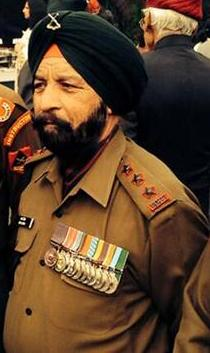
- Singh with his Param Vir Chakra medal
- Born: 6 January 1949 (age 77); Village Kadyal, Tehsil Ranbir Singh Pora, Jammu and Kashmir, India
- Military career
- Allegiance: India
- Branch: Indian Army
- Service years: 1969–2000
- Rank: Honorary Captain Subedar Major
- Service number: JC−155825
- Unit: 8th Battalion, JKLI
- Conflicts: Siachen Conflict; Operation Meghdoot; Operation Rajiv
- Awards: Param Vir Chakra

Honorary Captain (Subedar Major) Bana Singh, PVC (born 6 January 1949) is an Indian soldier and a recipient of the nation's highest gallantry award, the Param Vir Chakra. As a Naib Subedar in the Indian Army, he led the team that wrested control of the highest peak on the Siachen Glacier in Kashmir from Pakistani forces as part of Operation Rajiv. Following his success, India renamed the peak (previously designated as Quaid Post by the Pakistanis) to Bana Post in his honour.

== Early life ==
Singh was born in a Sikh family in Kadyal, Jammu, Jammu and Kashmir on 6 January 1949. His father was a farmer and his uncles were soldiers in the Indian Army.

He enlisted in the Indian Army on 6 January 1969, and began service with the 8th Battalion of the Jammu and Kashmir Light Infantry. He was trained at the High Altitude Warfare School in Gulmarg and at another school at Sonamarg. He was promoted to the rank of Naib Subedar from Havildar on 16 October 1985, less than two years before he would lead the successful team of Operation Rajiv.

== Operation Rajiv ==
In 1987, the strategically important Siachen area had been infiltrated by the Pakistani forces. The Pakistanis had captured an important position, which they called "Quaid post" (from Quaid-e-Azam, the title of Muhammad Ali Jinnah). The post was located at a height of 6500 metres on the highest peak in the Siachen Glacier area (the peak was later renamed to "Bana Top" by the Indians, in honour of Bana Singh). From this feature the Pakistanis could snipe at Indian army positions since the height gave a clear view of the entire Saltoro range and Siachen glacier. The enemy post was virtually an impregnable glacier fortress with ice walls, 457 metres high, on either side.

On 18 April 1987, the Pakistanis from Quaid Post fired on the Indian troops at Point Sonam (6,400 m), killing two soldiers. The Indian Army then decided to evict the Pakistanis from the Post. Naib Subedar Bana Singh was posted in Siachen on 20 April 1987, as part of the 8th JAK LI regiment, which was given the task of capturing the Quaid Post. On 29 May, a JAK LI patrol led by Second lieutenant Rajiv Pande made at an unsuccessful attempt of capturing the post, resulting in deaths of 10 Indian soldiers. After a month of preparation, the Indian Army launched a fresh operation to capture the post. This operation, called "Operation Rajiv" in honour of 2/Lt Rajiv Pande, was headed by Major Varinder Singh.

Starting on 23 June 1987, Major Varinder Singh's task force launched multiple attacks to capture the post. After initial failures, the 5-member team led by Nb Sub Bana Singh successfully captured the Quaid post on 26 June 1987. Nb Sub Bana Singh and his fellow soldiers, including Chuni Lal, climbed the steep 457 m high wall of ice. The team approached the Quaid Post from an unexpected direction, using a longer and more difficult approach than the other teams. There was a blizzard, resulting in poor visibility, which gave cover to the Indian soldiers. After reaching the top, Nb Sub Bana Singh found that there was a single Pakistani bunker. He lobbed a grenade into the bunker and closed the door, killing those inside. The two sides also got involved in a hand-to-hand combat, in which the Indian soldiers bayoneted some of the Pakistani soldiers outside the bunker. A few Pakistani soldiers jumped off the peak. Later, the Indians found six dead bodies of Pakistani soldiers.

On 26 January 1988, Nb Sub Bana Singh was awarded the Param Vir Chakra, the highest wartime gallantry medal in India for his bravery during Operation Rajiv. The peak which he captured was renamed Bana Top in his honour. At the time of the Kargil War, he was the only PVC awardee who was still serving in the Army.

== Param Vir Chakra Citation & Other Medals... ==
The Param Vir Chakra citation on the Official Indian Army Website reads as follows:

CITATION

NB SUB BANA SINGH
8 JAK LI (JC-155825)

Naib Subedar Bana Singh volunteered to be a member of a task force constituted in June 1987 to clear an intrusion by an adversary in the Siachen Glacier area at an altitude of 21,000 feet. The post was virtually an impregnable glacier fortress with ice walls, 1500 feet high, on both sides. Naib Subedar Bana Singh led his men through an extremely difficult and hazardous route. He inspired them by his indomitable courage and leadership. The brave Naib Subedar and his men crawled and closed in on the adversary. Moving from trench to trench, lobbing hand grenades and charging with the bayonet, he cleared the post of all intruders.

Nb Subedar Bana Singh displayed the most conspicuous gallantry and leadership under the most adverse conditions.

Military Decorations -

Param Vir Chakra	Paschimi Star	Siachen Glacier Medal	Sangram Medal
Special Service Medal	Sainya Seva Medal	High Altitude Medal	50th Independence Anniversary Medal
25th Independence Anniversary Medal	30 Years Long Service Medal	20 Years Long Service Medal	9 Years Long Service Medal

== After retirement ==
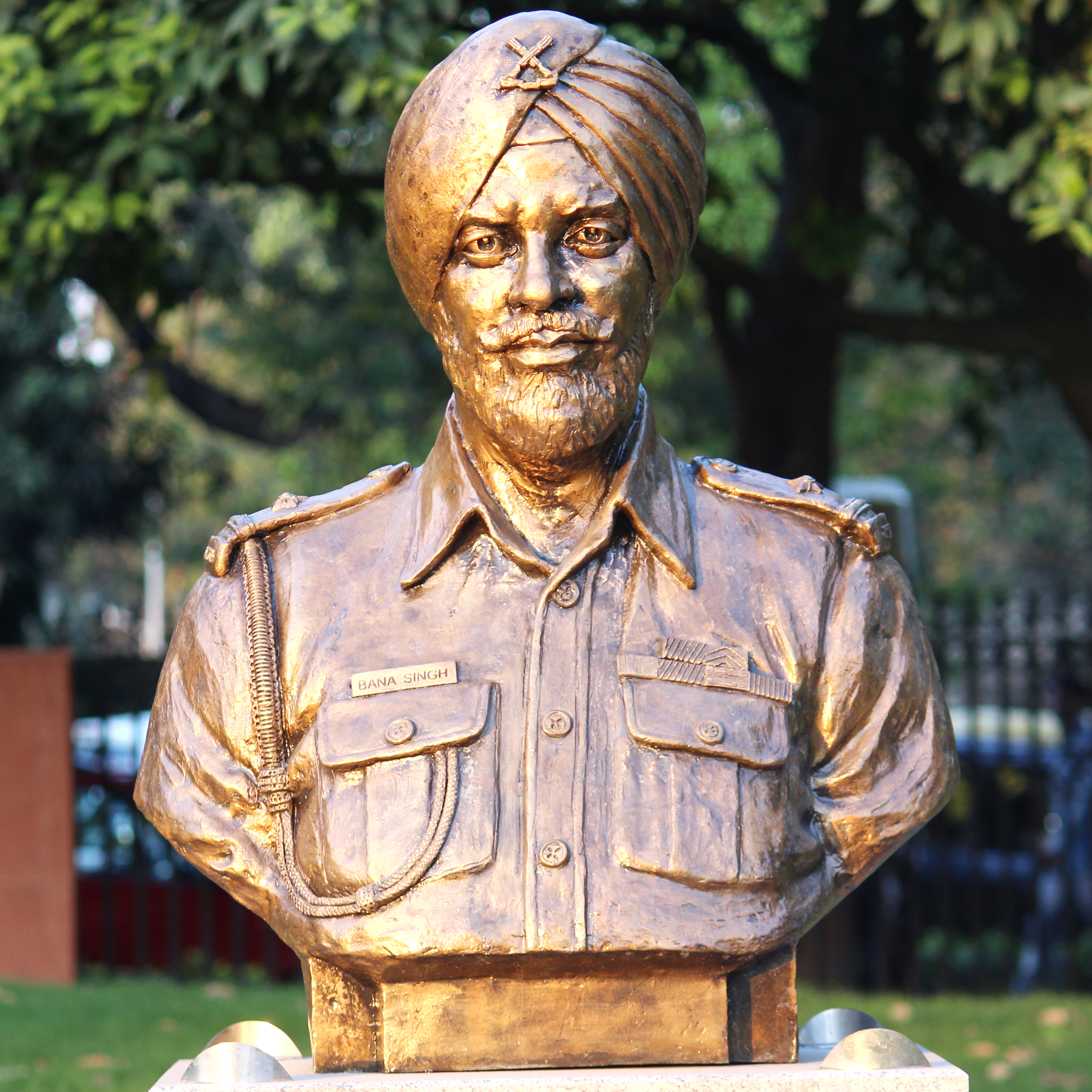
Singh's bust at Param Yodha Sthal, National War Memorial, New Delhi

Nb Sub Bana Singh was promoted to Subedar rank on 1 December 1992, with promotion to Subedar Major on 20 October 1996. He was given the honorary rank of Captain at his retirement. Hony Capt Bana Singh retired from service on 31 October 2000. The Jammu & Kashmir Government gave him a pension of ₹ 166 per month. Bana Singh protested against the low amount, pointing out that the neighbouring states of Punjab and Himachal Pradesh provided a monthly pension above ₹ 10,000 to the Param Vir Chakra awardees. In October 2006, the Punjab Government led by Captain Amarinder Singh announced a cash award of ₹ 1,000,000 for him. The cheque was presented to Bana Singh by Amarinder's successor Parkash Singh Badal in March 2007. The Punjab Government also offered him ₹ 2,500,000, a monthly allowance of ₹ 15,000 and a 25-acre plot, if he moved to Punjab. However, he refused the offer, saying that he is a resident of J&K. The J&K Government named a stadium in the Ranbir Singh Pora area of Jammu after him, and sanctioned an amount of Rs 5,000,000 for its development in 2010. However, in 2013, The Tribune reported that the funds had not been released, and the Bana Singh Memorial Stadium was in a poor shape.

Bana Singh's son Rajinder Singh joined the Indian Army in 2008, at the age of 18.

== See also ==
- Naib Subedar Chuni Lal, who was with Bana Singh at the action on the Siachen and who went on to be awarded the Ashoka Chakra, Vir Chakra and Sena Medal
- Baba Harbhajan Singh Temple and bunker
- Dhan Singh Thapa Post
- Jaswant Singh Rawat's Memorial at Sela La
- Indo-Pakistani Wars
- Kargil War
- Military of India
