= Saltoro Mountains =

Mountain range in India and Pakistan

- Saltoro Muztagh
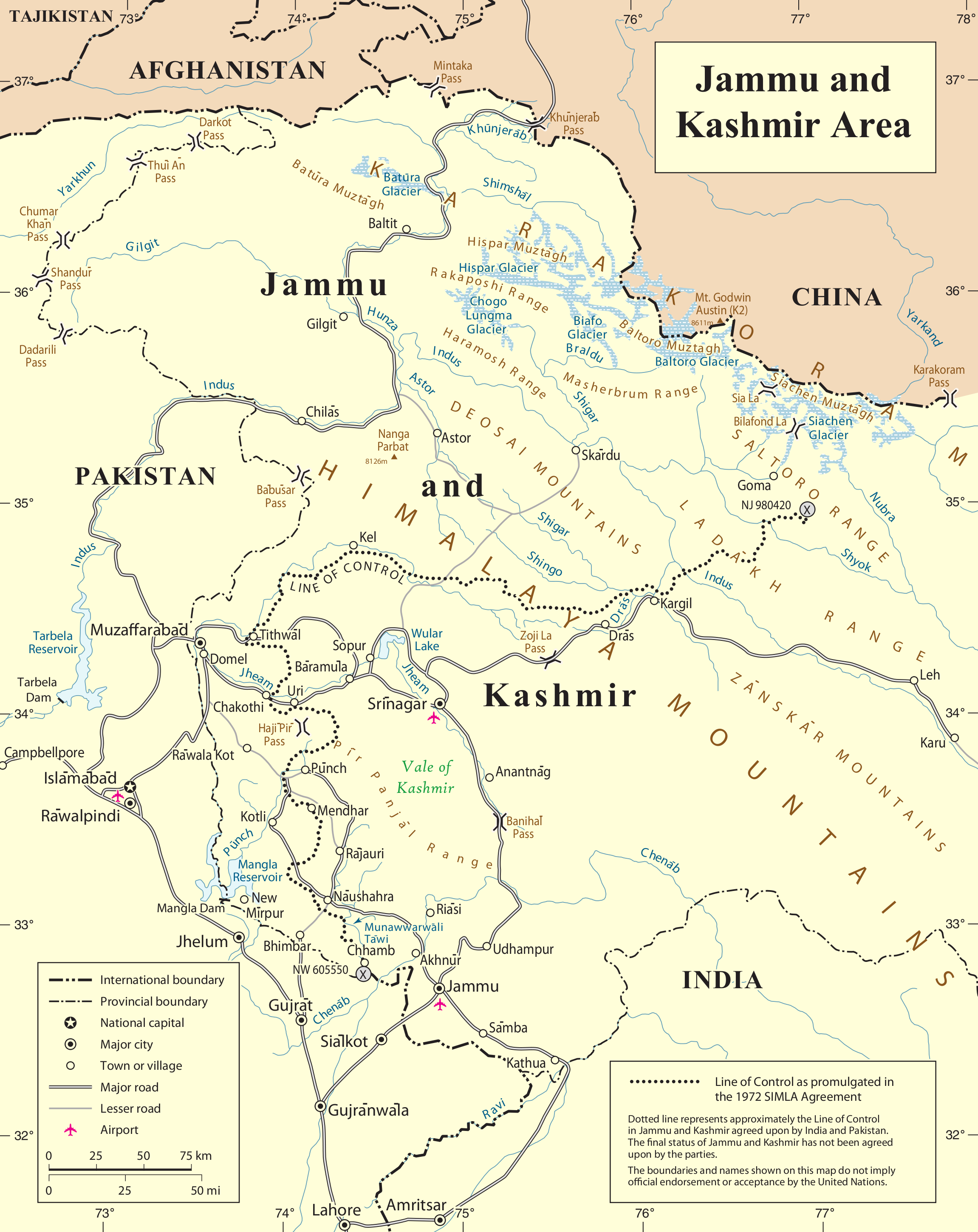

Highest point
- Peak: Saltoro Kangri
- Elevation: 7,742 m (25,400 ft)
- Coordinates: 35°24′01″N 76°50′55″E

Geography
- Location within Karakoram Location within Gilgit Baltistan Location within Pakistan Location within Ladakh Location within India
- Location: Actual Ground Position Line, on the border between Indian and Pakistani controlled territories
- Borders on: Masherbrum Mountains

The Saltoro Mountains form a subrange within the Karakoram Range and are situated in the southeastern part of the Karakoram. They lie on the southwest side of the Siachen Glacier, which is one of the two longest glaciers in the world outside the polar regions. The name "Saltoro" is also associated with the Saltoro Valley, located west of this range and descending on the Pakistani side of the Saltoro Range, which generally follows the Actual Ground Position Line (AGPL).

The Saltoro Range, of which western slopes are held by Pakistan and higher peaks and passes are held by India all of which remain snowbound throughout the year, provides access to Siachen Glacier to its east through five passes, i.e., listed from south to north are Chulung La (5,800m), Yarma La (6,100m), Gyong La (5,640m), Bilafond La (6,160m) - also called Saltoro La, and Sia La (7,300m). Saltoro Kangri peak, Saltoro River, and Saltoro Valley are features within the Saltoro Mountains range. The Actual Ground Position Line (AGPL) demarcates the boundary between the areas held by India and Pakistan in this region. In the Siachen area, India controls the high peaks and passes, while Pakistan occupies the lower peaks and valleys to the west.

The Saltoro Mountains are part of the Lesser Karakorams and are situated on the southwestern side of the major Karakoram glaciers, including the Siachen, Baltoro, Biafo and Hispar Glacier, which run from east to west. The primary ridge of the Karakoram Range is located to the northeast of these glaciers.

The subranges of the main ridge are generally referred to as "Muztagh," while the mountain groups within the Lesser Karakorams are often designated as individual mountains, ranges or groups.

The Saltoro Range is claimed by India as part of the Ladakh region and as part of the Gilgit–Baltistan region by Pakistan. Between 1984 and 1987, India assumed military control of the main peaks and passes of the range, with Pakistani forces holding the glacial valleys just to the west. Hence, despite high peaks and dramatic climbing opportunities, they are rarely visited except by military forces due to the ongoing Siachen Conflict.

On the southwest side, the Saltoro Mountains drop steeply to the valleys of the Kondus and Dansam Rivers, which join to form the Saltoro River, a tributary of the Shyok River. This in turn flows into the Indus River. To the northwest, the Kondus Glacier separates the range from the neighboring Masherbrum Mountains, while on the southeast, the Gyong River, Glacier, and Pass (Gyong La) separate the northern Saltoro Mountains from the southern Saltoro Mountains or "Kailas Mountains" (not to be confused with Tibet's sacred Mount Kailash).

== Background ==
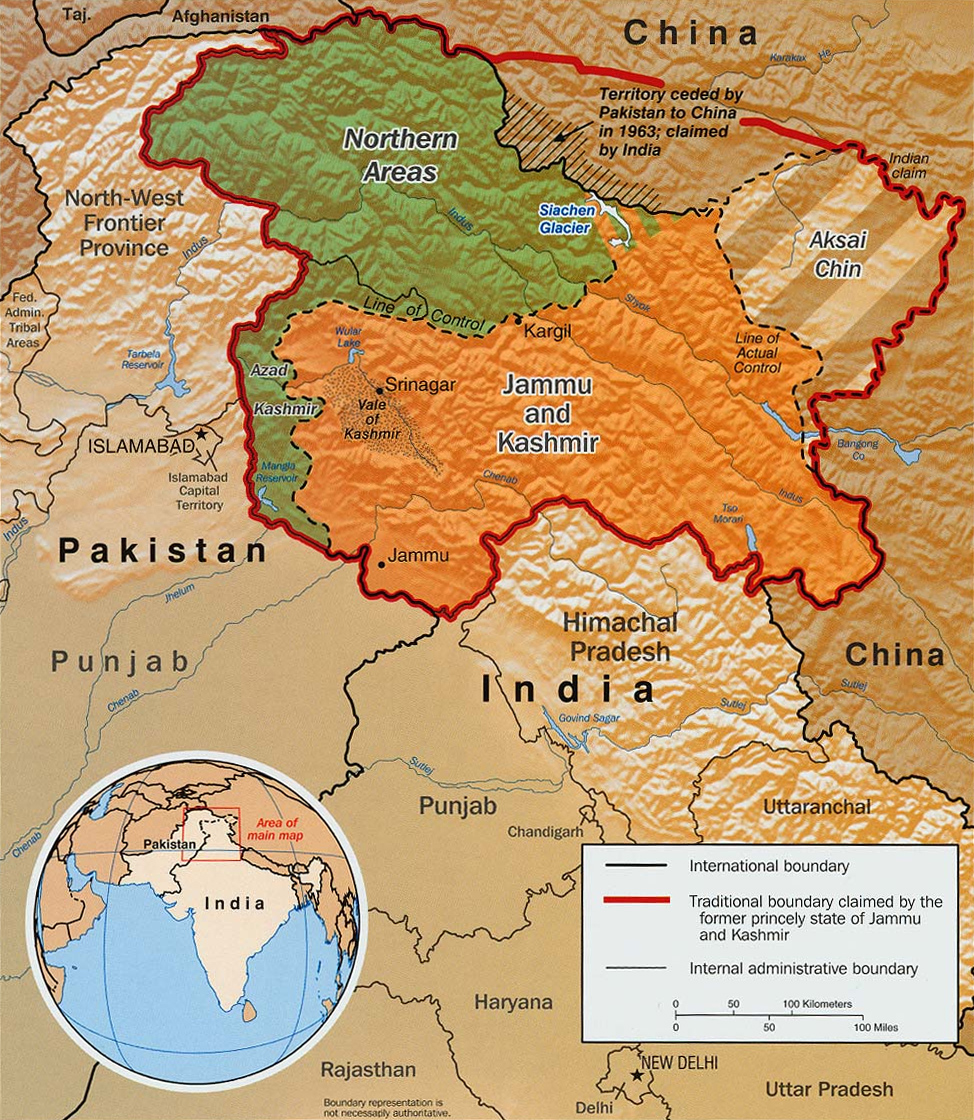
Indo-Pak mutually-agreed undisputed "International Border" (IB) in the black line, Indo-Pak "Line of Control" (LoC) in black dotted line in the north and west, Indo-Sino "Line of Actual" (LAC) in black dotted line in the east, Indo-Pak line across Siachen in north is "Actual Ground Position Line" (AGPL). The areas shown in green are the two Pakistani-controlled areas: Gilgit–Baltistan in the north and Azad Kashmir in the south. The area shown in orange is the Indian-controlled territories of Jammu and Kashmir, and Ladakh, and the diagonally-hatched area to the east is the Chinese-controlled area known as Aksai Chin. "Territories ceded by Pakistan to China claimed by India" in the north is Shaksgam (Trans-Karakoram Tract).

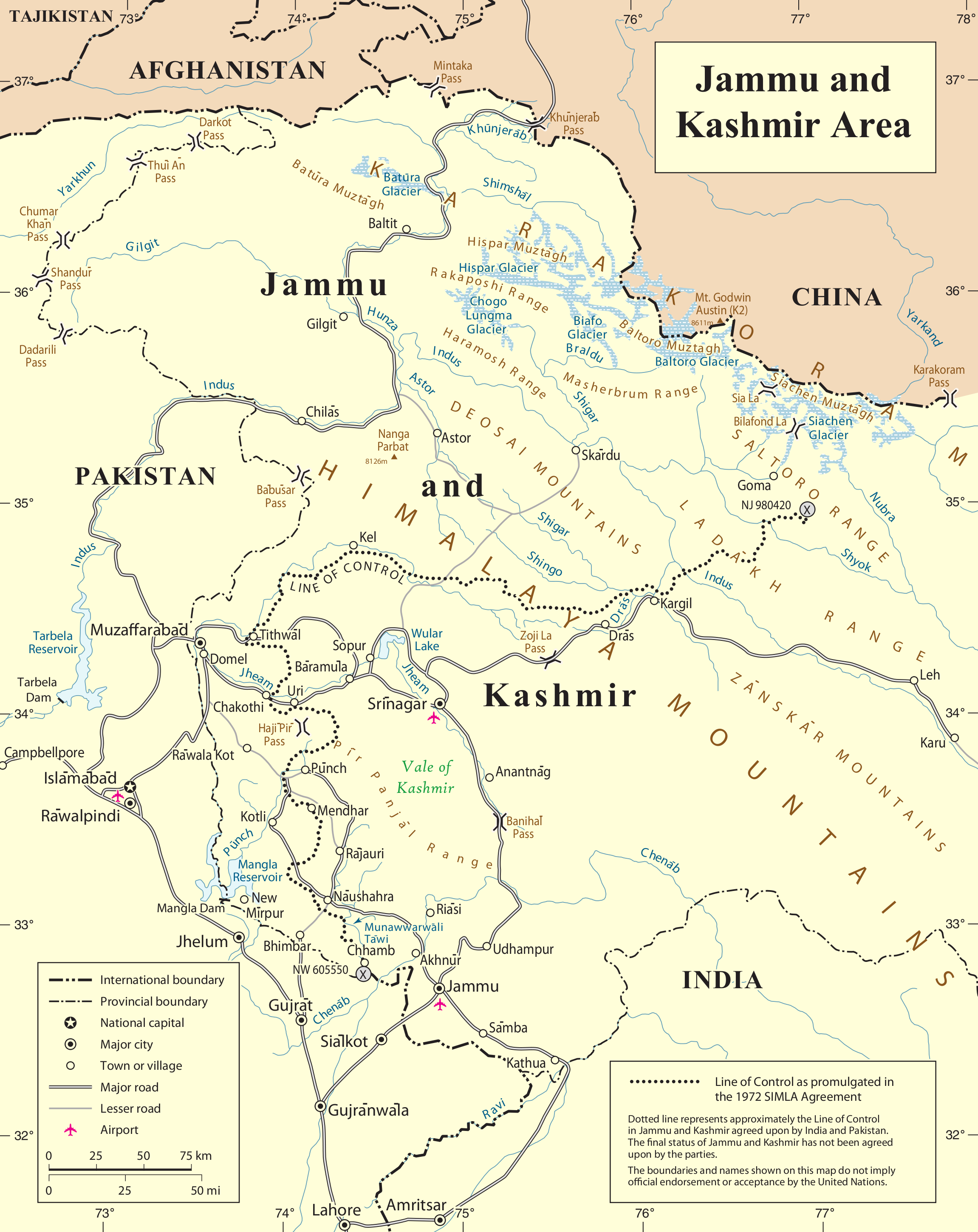
United Nations map of Siachen Glacier showing "Point NJ980420" (Point NJ9842) as starting point of "Actual Ground Position Line" (AGPL). Nubra River valley and Siachen glaciers held by India. AGPL starts from NJ9842 and goes north via Gyong La, Chumik, Sia La, Saltoro Glacier, Bilafond La to Indira Col West, all of which are held by India. Goma military camp, Masherbrum Range, Baltoro Glacier, Baltoro Glacier, Baltoro Muztagh and K2 are held by Pakistan.

=== Indo-Pakistan borders: SC, IB, LOC, AGPL ===
The actual India-Pakistan boundary is divided into 4 types of borders: disputed Sir Creek (SC) riverine border, mutually agreed India–Pakistan International Border (IB) from north of Sir Creek to north of Dhalan near Jammu, Line of Control (LoC) across disputed Kashmir and Ladakh regions from north of Dhalan in India and west of Chicken's Neck in Pakistan to Point NJ9842, and Actual Ground Position Line (AGPL) across Siachen from Point NJ9842 to Indira Col West. Siachen lies south of the Shaksgam ceded by Pakistan to China via the 1963 Sino-Pakistan Agreement but also claimed by India and Aksai Chin held by China since 1962 but also claimed by India. The Shaksgam Tract controlled by China is located north of the Saltoro mountain range from the Apsarasas Kangri Range to 90 km northwest of K2.

=== AGPL ===
The AGPL runs roughly along the Saltoro Mountains from Point NJ9842 on the India-Pakistan LoC to near La Yongma Ri, Gyong La, Gyong Kangri, Chumik Kangri, Bilafond La (pass) and nearby Bana Post, Saltoro Kangri, Ghent Kangri, and Sia La to the India–Pakistan–China trijunction northwest of Indira Col West on the Sino-Indian LAC. The peaks and passes under Pakistan's control such as Gayari Camp, Chogolisa, Baltoro Glacier, Conway Saddle, Baltoro Muztagh, and Gasherbrum lie west of the AGPL.

== Selected peaks ==
The following is a table of the peaks in the Saltoro Mountains which are over 7,200 metres (23,622 ft) in elevation and have over 500 metres (1,640 ft) of topographic prominence. (This is a common criterion for peaks of this stature to be independent.)

Mountain	Height (m)	Height (ft)	Coordinates	Prominence (m)	Parent mountain	First ascent	Ascents (attempts)
Saltoro Kangri	7,742	25,400	35°23′57″N 76°50′51″E	2,160	Gasherbrum I	1962	2 (1)
K12	7,428	24,370	35°17′42″N 77°01′18″E	1,978	Saltoro Kangri	1974	4 (2)
Ghent Kangri (Mount Ghent)	7,401	24,281	35°31′03″N 76°48′01″E	1,493	Saltoro Kangri	1961	4 (0)
Sherpi Kangri	7,380	24,213	35°27′58″N 76°46′53″E	900	Ghent Kangri	1976	1 (1)

== See also ==
Borders

- Actual Ground Position Line (AGPL)
- India–Pakistan International Border (IB)
- Line of Control (LoC)
- Line of Actual Control (LAC)
- Sir Creek (SC)
- Borders of China
- Borders of India
- Borders of Pakistan

Conflicts

- Kashmir conflict
- Siachen conflict
- Sino-Indian conflict
- List of disputed territories of China
- List of disputed territories of India
- List of disputed territories of Pakistan
- Northern Areas
- Trans-Karakoram Tract

Operations

- Operation Meghdoot 1984 in Siachen, by India
- Operation Rajiv 1987 in Siachen, by India
- Operation Safed Sagar 1999 in Kargil War, by India

Other related topics

- Awards and decorations of the Indian Armed Forces
- Bana Singh, after whom Quaid Post was renamed to Bana Top
- Dafdar, westernmost town in Trans-Karakoram Tract
- India-China Border Roads
- Sino-Pakistan Agreement for transfer of Trans-Karakoram Tract to China

== Sources ==
- Jerzy Wala, Geographical Sketch Map of the Karakoram, Swiss Foundation for Alpine Research, Zurich, 1990.
