= Varinder Singh (soldier) =

Indian Army officer

Varinder Singh Minhas VrC, SM (24 January 1955 – 12 October 2012) was an Indian Army officer. As a Major, he commanded Operation Rajiv to capture the erstwhile Quaid post (now known as Bana Post) in Siachen area. During this action, then-Nb Sub Bana Singh won the Param Vir Chakra, India's highest award for gallantry. Then-major Varinder Singh was also seriously wounded in combat during this action, and was awarded the Vir Chakra for gallantry in the face of the enemy.

== Early life and education ==
Brigadier Varinder Singh born in Sikh family of Village Padhiana Jalandhar District. He attended the prestigious Cambrian Hall public school in Dehradun, India. He later attended the National Defence Academy, Khadakvasla, and the Indian Military Academy, Dehradun.

== Military career ==
Brigadier Varinder Singh was commissioned into the 12th Battalion of the Jammu and Kashmir Light Infantry regiment of the Indian Army, and served in various capacities during his career spanning over three decades. Among other appointments, he also served as Commandant of the Jammu and Kashmir Light Infantry centre, the primary training establishment for new recruits to the regiment. He was awarded the Sena Medal, for distinguished service of a high order. During the operation to liberate the former Quaid post, then-Major Varinder Singh was grievously injured, receiving bullet wounds to the chest and torso. He, however refused to be evacuated, and continued to command his troops. For his gallantry in this action, he was awarded the Vir Chakra, the third highest decoration awarded by the Government of India, for bravery in the face of the enemy.

== Vir Chakra ==
Brigadier Singh's citation for the Vir Chakra reads:

Vir Chakra (VrC) Awardee: Brig Varinder Singh, VrC, SM

Gazette Notification: 35 Pres/88, 22.1.88 Operation: -
Date of Award: 26 Jan 1988

Citation: The adversary taking advantage of bad weather during the middle of April, 1987, established themselves on a dominating feature, 'Left Shoulder', in the Siachen Glacier area and started firing with machine guns and rocket launchers preventing maintenance both by surface and air of Indian posts in Bilafondla. This created an adverse tactical position. On the night of 23 June 1987, the assault team under Major Varinder Singh managed to make an approach adopting the most difficult route to the 700 feet high vertical ice-wall on the Saltoro Ridge, and next night negotiated the ice wall and reached just 200 metres from the top.

The advance was resumed at 2100 hours on 25 June 1987 and under intense fire his party managed to capture the bunker after lobbying grenades at 0200 hours on 26 June 1987. It was their third night in the open sub-zero temperature. By 0500 hours, Major Varinder Singh's assault team captured the second bunker after firing twenty rounds of 84 M M Rocket Launcher. He pressed on the attack, providing supporting fire cover while a small party led by Naib Subedar Bana Singh crawled to the last bunker and after a ferocious charge captured it. While mopping up operations were in progress, there was a heavy artillery shelling by the adversary's troops in which the officer was badly wounded. Undeterred by his wounds, Major Varinder Singh assumed control of the Area Top by 1600 hours on 26 June 1987, thus regaining tactical superiority over the adversary. Major Varinder Singh displayed conspicuous courage and valiant leadership in the face of the adversary.

== Personal life ==
After retirement, Brigadier Varinder Singh established himself in business in the New Delhi area. He died on 12 October 2012, and is survived by his wife, Mrs. Anita Singh, a daughter, and a son. Brigadier Varinder Singh's wife Anita's paternal uncle, Brigadier Lekhraj Singh Puar, had been the first Colonel of the Regiment of the Jammu and Kashmir Light Infantry, in the 1970's.
