= Siachen Glacier =

Glacier in the Karakoram range in the Himalayas

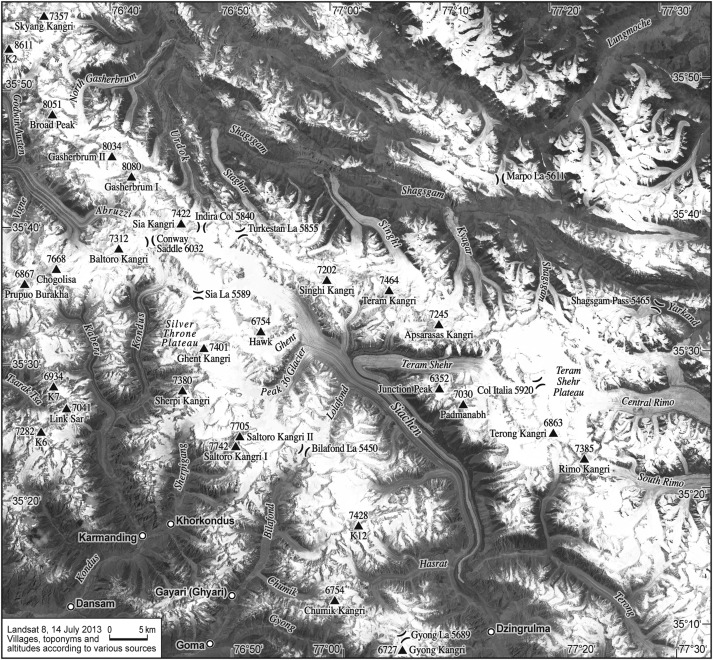
- Satellite imagery of the Siachen Glacier

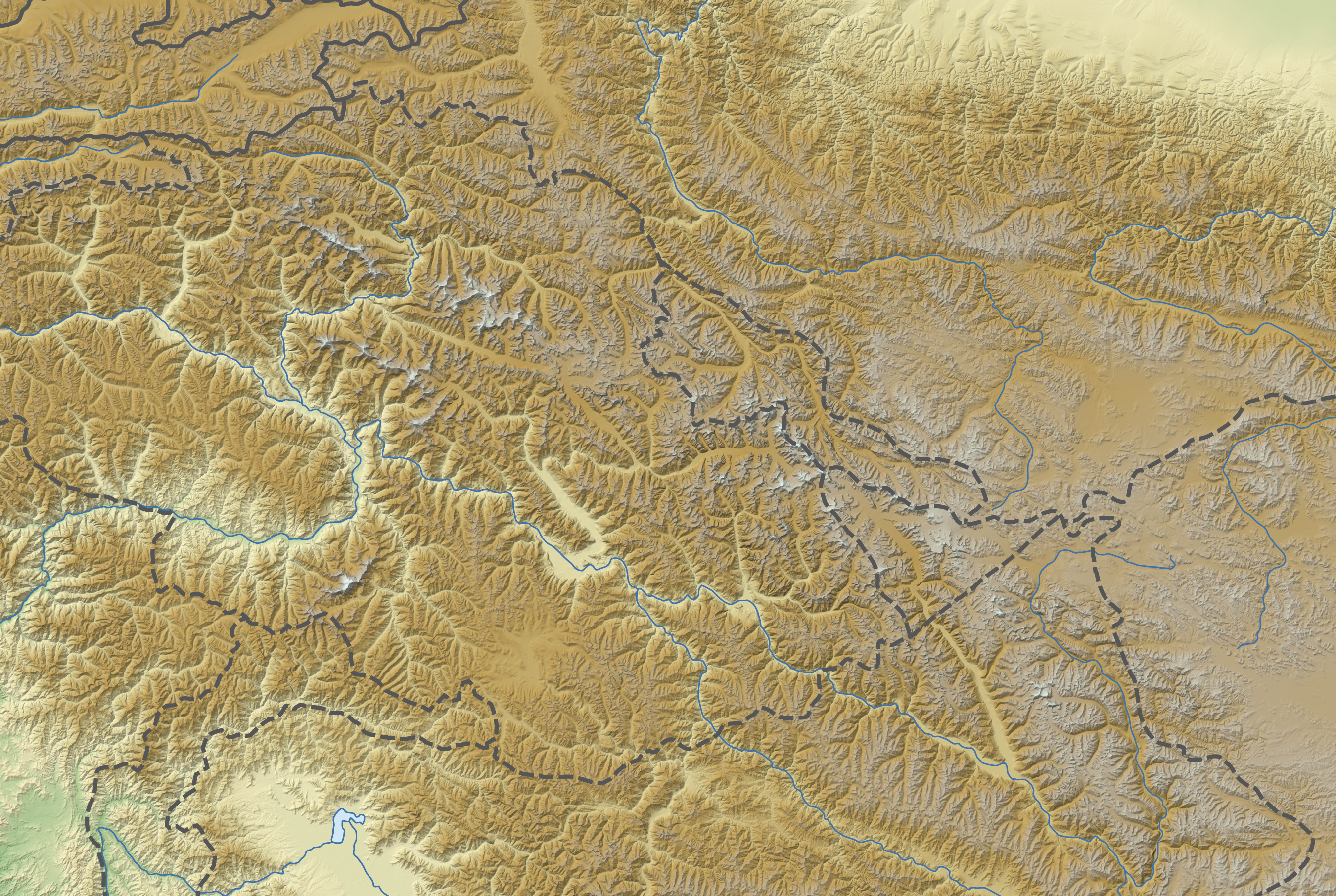
- Location within Karakoram Location within Ladakh Location within India

- Location of the Siachen Glacier within the greater Karakoram region
- Interactive map of Siachen Glacier
- Type: Mountain glacier
- Location: Karakoram, Ladakh (administered by India, claimed by Pakistan)
- Coordinates: 35°11′55″N 77°12′05″E
- Area: 2,500 km^{2} (970 sq mi)
- Length: 76 km (47 mi) using the longest route as is done when determining river lengths or 70 km (43 mi) if measuring from Indira Col

The Siachen Glacier is a glacier located in the eastern Karakoram range of the Himalayas, in Indian-administered Ladakh. It is situated just northeast of the terminal point NJ9842 of the Line of Control between India and Pakistan, and to the south of the Line of Actual Control between India and China, in the disputed Kashmir region. At 76 km (47 mi) long, it is the longest glacier in the Karakoram and second-longest in the world's non-polar areas. It falls from an altitude of 5,753 m (18,875 ft) above sea level at its head at Indira Col on the India–China border down to 3,620 m (11,875 ft) at its terminus. The entire Siachen Glacier, with all major passes, has been under the administration of India since 1984. Pakistan maintains a territorial claim over the Siachen Glacier and controls the region west of Saltoro Ridge, lying west of the glacier, with Pakistani posts located 1 km below more than 100 Indian posts on the ridge.

The Siachen Glacier lies immediately south of the great drainage divide that separates the Eurasian Plate from the Indian subcontinent in the extensively glaciated portion of the Karakoram sometimes called the "Third Pole". The glacier lies between the Saltoro Ridge immediately to the west and the main Karakoram range to the east. The Saltoro Ridge originates in the north from the Sia Kangri peak on the China border in the Karakoram range. The crest of the Saltoro Ridge's altitudes range from 5,450 to 7,720 m (17,880 to 25,330 feet). The major passes on this ridge are, from north to south, Sia La at 5,589 m (18,336 ft), Bilafond La at 5,450 m (17,880 ft), and Gyong La at 5,689 m (18,665 ft). The average winter snowfall is more than 1000 cm (35 ft) and temperatures can dip to −50 °C (−58 °F). Including all tributary glaciers, the Siachen Glacier system covers about 700 km^{2} (270 sq mi).

== Etymology ==
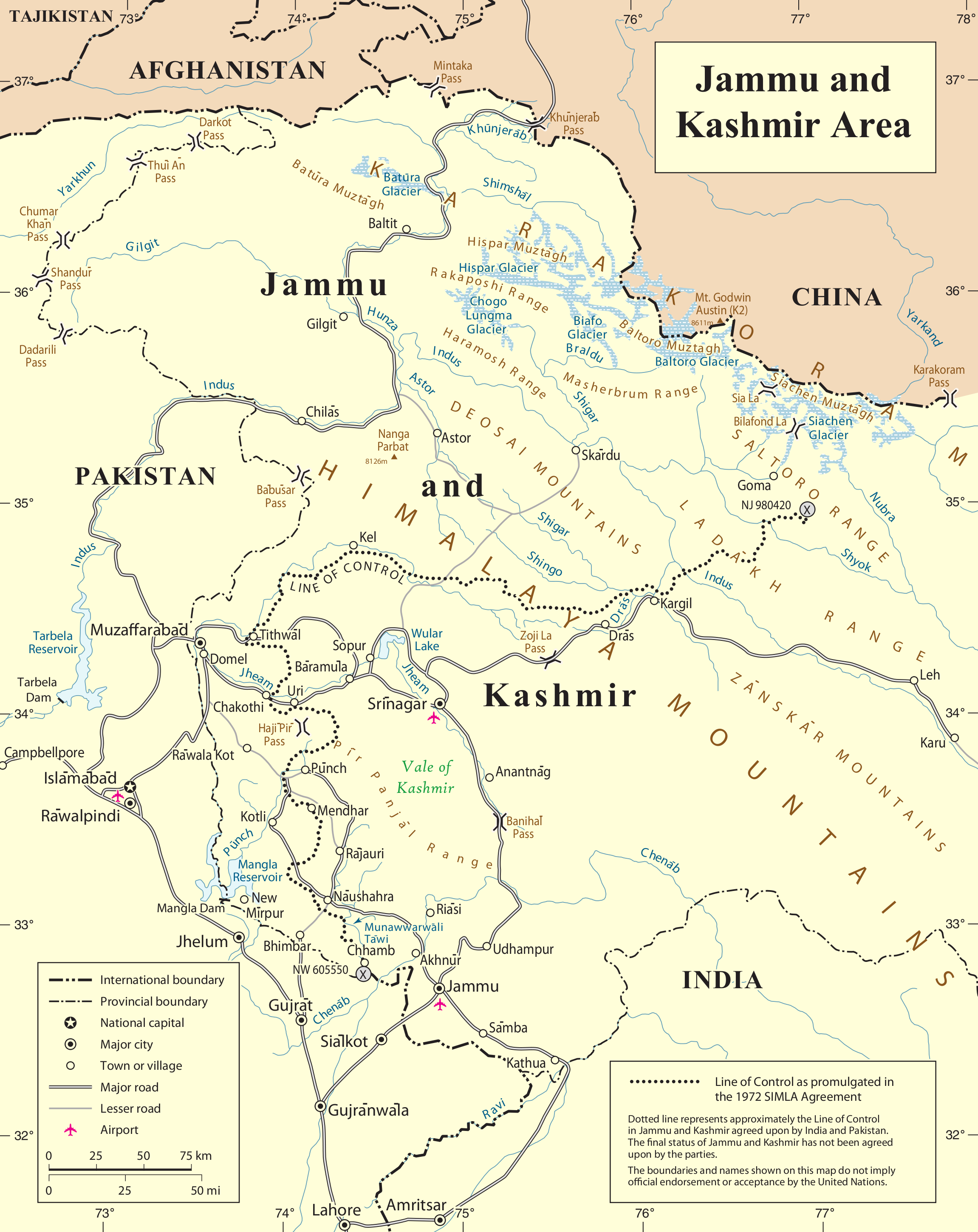
UN map of the Line of Control in Kashmir, which ends at the point NJ980420

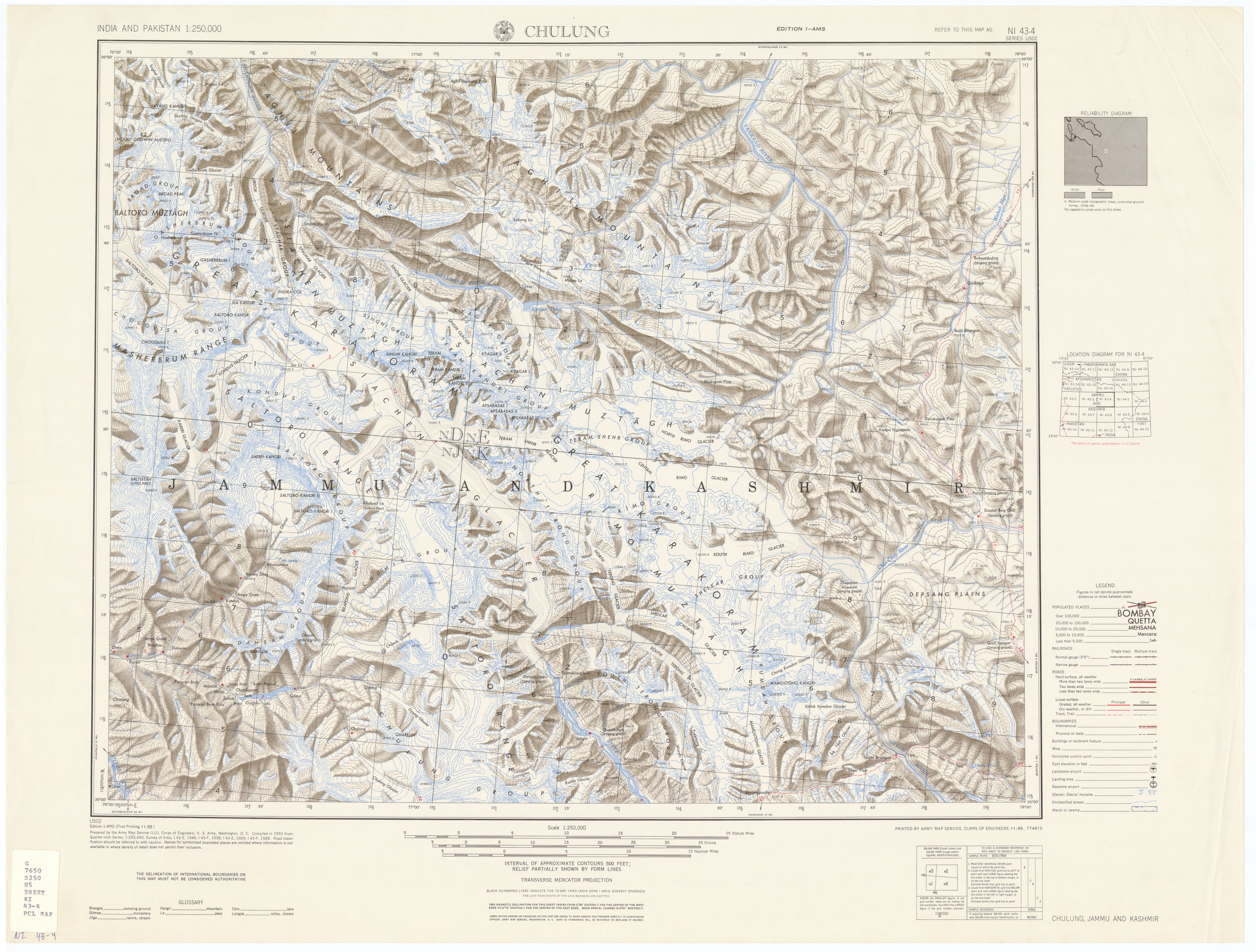
Historical map including Siachen Glacier (AMS, 1953) (Note: From map: "THE DELINEATION OF INTERNATIONAL BOUNDARIES ON THIS MAP MUST NOT BE CONSIDERED AUTHORITATIVE")

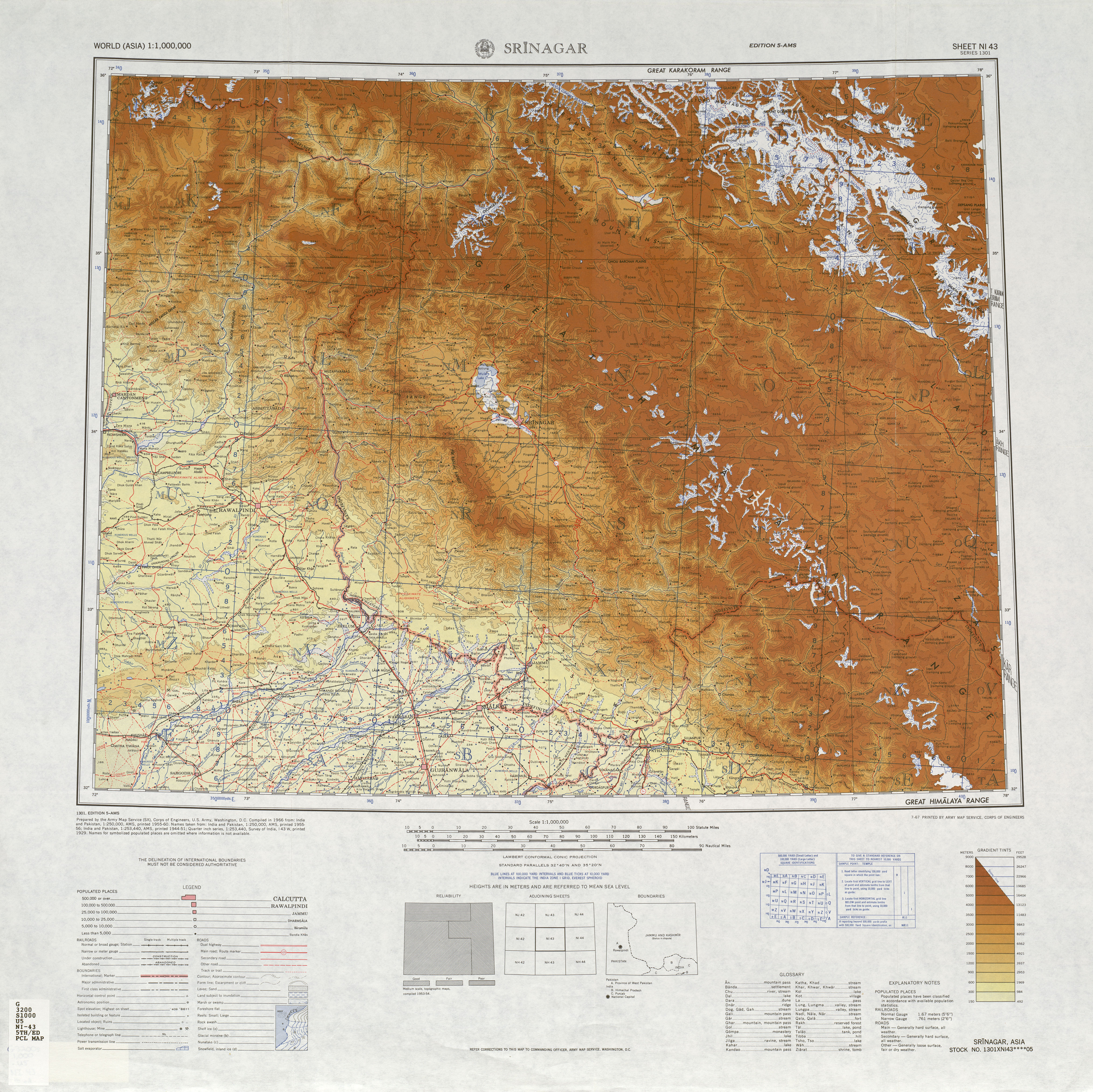
Historical map including Siachen Glacier (AMS, 1966) (Note: From map: "THE DELINEATION OF INTERNATIONAL BOUNDARIES MUST NOT BE CONSIDERED AUTHORITATIVE")

"Sia" in the Balti language refers to the rose family plant widely dispersed in the region. "Chen" refers to any object found in abundance. Thus the name Siachen refers to a land with an abundance of roses. The naming of the glacier itself, or at least its currency, is attributed to Tom Longstaff.

== Dispute ==
Both India and Pakistan claim sovereignty over the entire Siachen region. In June 1958, first Geological Survey of India expedition went to the Siachen glacier. It was the first official Indian survey of Siachen Glacier by Geological Survey of India post-1947 and that was undertaken to commemorate the International Geophysical Year in 1958. The study included snout surveying of five glaciers namely Siachen, Mamostong, Chong Kumdan, Kichik Kumdan and Aktash Glaciers in Ladakh region. 5Q 131 05 084 was the number assigned to the Siachen glacier by the expedition. U.S. and Pakistani maps in the 1970s and 1980s consistently showed a dotted line from NJ9842 (the northernmost demarcated point of the India-Pakistan cease-fire line, also known as the Line of Control) to the Karakoram Pass, which India believed to be a cartographic error and in violation of the Simla Agreement. In 1984, India launched Operation Meghdoot, a military operation that gave India control over all of the Siachen Glacier, including its tributaries. Between 1984 and 1999, frequent skirmishes took place between India and Pakistan. Indian troops under Operation Meghdoot pre-empted Pakistan's Operation Ababeel by just one day to occupy most of the dominating heights on Saltoro Ridge to the west of Siachen Glacier. However, more soldiers have died from the harsh weather conditions in the region than from combat. Pakistan lost 353 soldiers in various operations recorded between 2003 and 2010 near Siachen, including 140 Pakistanis killed in the 2012 Gayari Sector avalanche. Between January 2012 and July 2015, 33 Indian soldiers died due to adverse weather. In December 2015, Indian Union Minister of State for Defence Rao Inderjit Singh said in a written reply in the Lok Sabha that a total of 869 Army personnel have died on the Siachen glacier due to climatic conditions and environmental and other factors from the date that the Army launched Operation Meghdoot in 1984. In February 2016, Indian Defence Minister Manohar Parrikar stated that India will not vacate Siachen, as there is a trust deficit with Pakistan and also said that 915 people have died in Siachen since Operation Meghdoot in 1984. According to official records, only 220 Indian soldiers have been killed by enemy bullets since 1984 in Siachen area. Both India and Pakistan continue to deploy thousands of troops in the vicinity of Siachen and attempts to demilitarize the region have been so far unsuccessful. Prior to 1984, neither country had any military forces in this area.

Aside from the Indian and Pakistani military presence, the glacier region is unpopulated. The nearest civilian settlement is the village of Warshi, 10 miles downstream from the Indian base camp. The region is also extremely remote, with limited road connectivity. On the Indian side, roads go only as far as the military base camp at Dzingrulma (35.1663°N 77.2162°E), 72 km from the head of the glacier. The Indian Army has developed various means to reach the Siachen region, including the Manali-Leh-Khardung La-Siachen route. In 2012, Chief of Army Staff of the Indian Army General Bikram Singh said that the Indian Army should stay in the region for strategic advantages, and because a "lot of blood has been shed" by Indian armed personnel for Siachen. The present ground positions, relatively stable for over a decade, mean that India maintains control over all of the 76 kilometres (47 mi) Siachen Glacier and all of its tributary glaciers, as well as all the main passes and heights of the Saltoro Ridge immediately west of the glacier, including Sia La, Bilafond La, Gyong La, Yarma La (6,100m), and Chulung La (5,800m). Pakistan controls the glacial valleys immediately west of the Saltoro Ridge. According to TIME magazine, India gained over 1,000 square miles (3,000 km^{2}) in territory because of its 1980s military operations in Siachen. India has categorically stated that India will not pull its army from Siachen until the 110-km long AGPL is first authenticated, delineated and then demarcated.

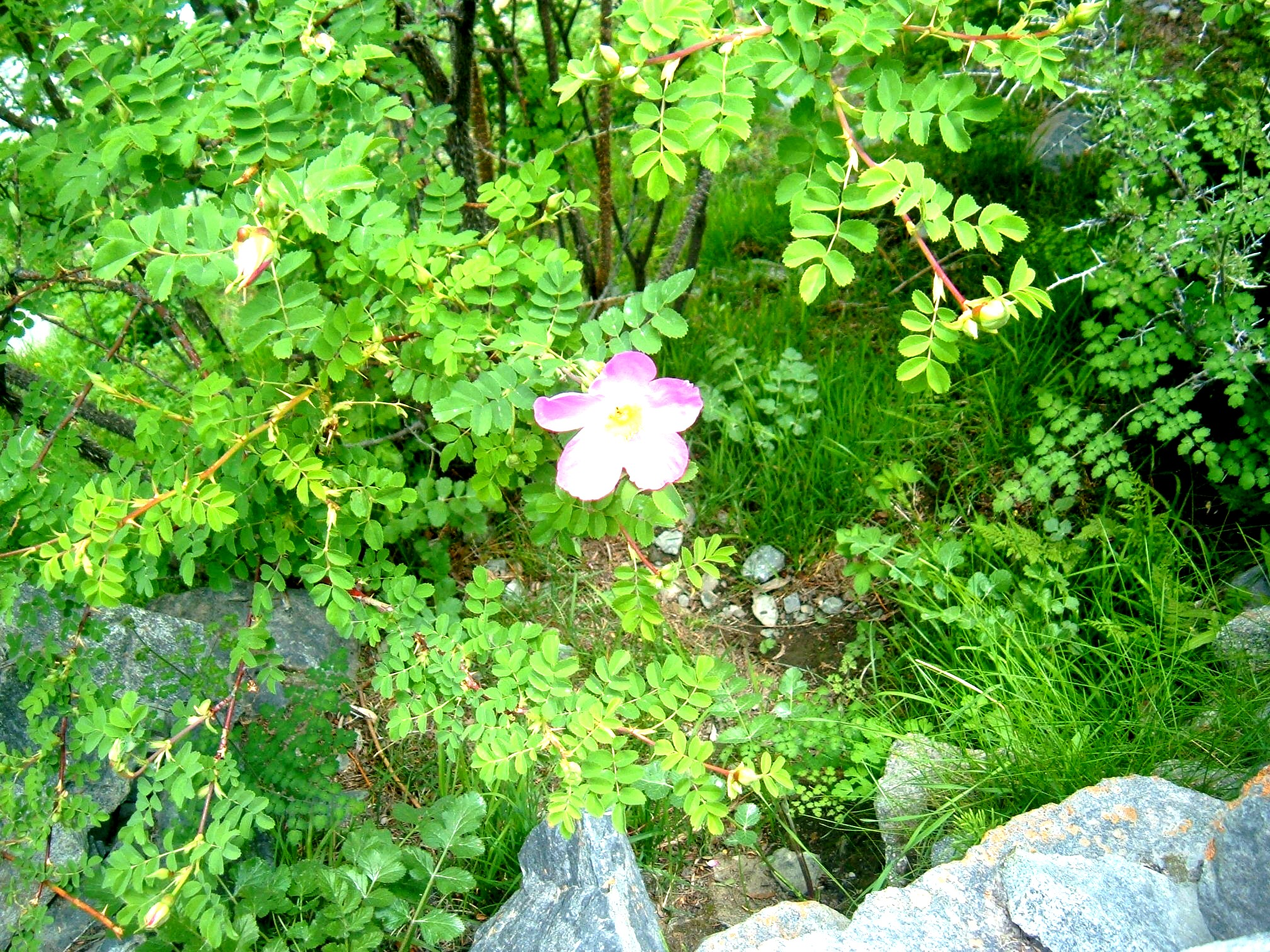
Sia plant in Khaplu. Balti people grow this rose family in their houses as decoration, and its bark is used in payo cha (butter tea) instead of green tea leaves in some areas

The 1949 Karachi agreement only carefully delineated the line of separation to point NJ9842, after which, the agreement states, the line of separation would continue "thence north to the glaciers". According to the Indian stance, the line of separation should continue roughly northwards along the Saltoro Range to the west of the Siachen glacier beyond NJ9842; international boundary lines that follow mountain ranges often do so by following the watershed drainage divide such as that of the Saltoro Range. The 1972 Simla Agreement made no change to the 1949 Line of Control in this northernmost sector.

== Drainage ==
Siachen glacier is a source to the Nubra River which later joins the Shyok River.

The glacier's melting waters are the main source of the Nubra River in the Indian region of Ladakh, which drains into the Shyok River. The Shyok in turn joins the 3000 kilometre-long Indus River which flows through Pakistan. Thus, the glacier is a major source of the Indus and feeds the largest irrigation system in the world.

== Environmental issues ==
The glacier was uninhabited before 1984, and the presence of thousands of troops since then has introduced pollution and melting to the glacier. To support the troops, glacial ice has been cut and melted with chemicals.

Dumping of non-biodegradable waste in large quantities and the use of arms and ammunition have considerably affected the ecosystem of the region.

=== Glacial retreat ===
Preliminary findings of a survey by Pakistan Meteorological Department in 2007 revealed that the Siachen glacier has been retreating for the past 30 years and is melting at an alarming rate. The study of satellite images of the glacier showed that the glacier is retreating at a rate of about 110 metres a year and that the glacier size has decreased by almost 35 percent. In an eleven-year period, the glacier had receded nearly 800 metres, and in seventeen years about 1700 metres. It is predicted that the glaciers of the Siachen region will be reduced to about one-fifth of their 2011 size by 2035. In the twenty-nine-year period 1929–1958, well before the military occupation, the glacial retreat was recorded to be about 914 metres. One of the reasons theorized for the recent glacial retreat is chemical blasting, to construct camps and posts. In 2001 India laid oil pipelines (about 250 kilometres long) inside the glacier to supply kerosene and aviation fuel to the outposts from base camps. As of 2007, the temperature rise at Siachen was estimated at 0.2-degree Celsius annually, causing melting, avalanches, and crevasses in the glacier.

=== Waste dumping ===
The waste produced by the troops stationed there is dumped in the crevasses of the glacier. Mountaineers who visited the area while on climbing expeditions witnessed large amount of garbage, empty ammunition shells, parachutes etc. dumped on the glacier, that neither decomposes nor can be burned because of the extreme climatic conditions. About 1,000 kilograms (1.1 short tons) of waste is produced and dumped in glacial crevasses daily by Indian forces. The Indian army is said to have planned a "Green Siachen, Clean Siachen" campaign to airlift the garbage from the glacier, and to use biodigestors for biodegradable waste in the absence of oxygen and freezing temperatures. Almost forty percent (40%) of the waste left at the glacier is plastic and metal, including toxins such as cobalt, cadmium and chromium that eventually affect the water of the Shyok River (which ultimately enters the Indus River near Skardu). The Indus is used for drinking and irrigation. Research is being done by scientists of The Energy and Resources Institute, to find ways to successfully dispose of the garbage generated at the glacier using scientific means. Some scientists of the Defence Research and Development Organisation who went on an expedition to Antarctica are also working to produce a bacterium that can thrive in extreme weather conditions and can be helpful in decomposing the biodegradable waste naturally.

=== Fauna and flora ===
The flora and fauna of the Siachen region are also affected by the huge military presence. The region is home to rare species including snow leopard, brown bear and ibex that are at risk because of the military presence.

== Border conflict ==
The glacier's region is the highest battleground on Earth, where Pakistan and India have fought intermittently since April 1984. Both countries maintain a permanent military presence in the region at a height of over 6,000 m (20,000 ft).

Both India and Pakistan have wished to disengage from the costly military outposts. India launched Operation Meghdoot to occupy Siachen Glacier in 1984. Then, due to the Pakistani incursions during the Kargil War in 1999, India abandoned plans to withdraw from Siachen, wary of further Pakistani incursions if they vacate the Siachen Glacier posts.

Prime Minister Manmohan Singh became the first Indian Prime Minister to visit the area, during which he called for a peaceful resolution of the problem. After that present Prime Minister Narendra Modi also visited this place. President of Pakistan Asif Ali Zardari also visited an area near the Siachen Glacier called Gayari Sector during 2012 with Pakistan Army Chief Gen. Ashfaq Parvez Kayani. Both of them showed their commitment to resolve the Siachen conflict as early as possible. In the previous year, the President of India, Abdul Kalam became the first head of state to visit the area.

Since September 2007, India has opened up limited mountaineering and trekking expeditions to the area. The first group included cadets from Chail Military School, National Defence Academy, National Cadet Corps, Indian Military Academy, Rashtriya Indian Military College and family members of armed forces officers. The expeditions are also meant to show to the international audience that Indian troops hold "almost all dominating heights" on the key Saltoro Ridge and to show that Pakistani troops are nowhere near the Siachen Glacier. Ignoring protests from Pakistan, India maintains that it does not need anyone's approval to send trekkers to Siachen, in what it says is essentially its own territory. In addition, the Indian Army's Army Mountaineering Institute (AMI) functions out of the region.

== Peace Park proposal ==
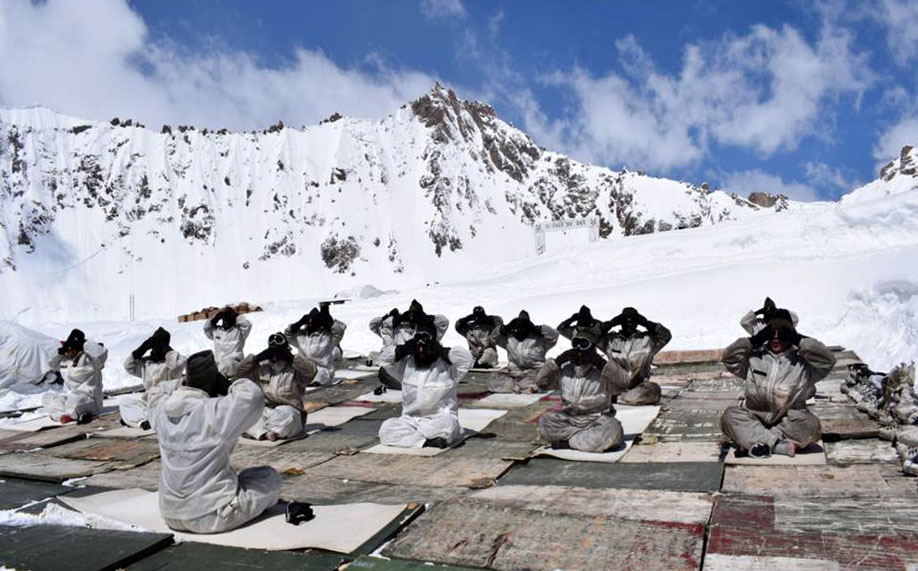
Indian Army Jawans performing yoga, on the occasion of the 3rd International Day of Yoga – 2017, at Siachen on June 21, 2017

The idea of declaring the Siachen region a "Peace Park" was presented by environmentalists and peace activists in part to preserve the ecosystem of the region badly affected by the military presence. In September 2003, the governments of India and Pakistan were urged by the participants of the 5th World Parks Congress held at Durban, to establish a peace park in the Siachen region to restore the natural biological system and protect species whose lives are at risk. Italian ecologist Giuliano Tallone said the ecological life was at serious risk, and proposed setting up a Siachen Peace Park at the conference. After a proposal of a transboundary Peace Park was floated, the International Mountaineering and Climbing Federation (UIAA) and the International Union for Conservation of Nature (IUCN) organised a conference at Geneva and invited Indian and Pakistani mountaineers (Mandip Singh Soin, Harish Kapadia, Nazir Sabir and Sher Khan). The region was nominated for inclusion in the United Nations' World Heritage List as a part of the Karakoram range, but this was deferred by the World Heritage Committee. The areas to the east and west of the Siachen region have already been declared national parks: the Karakoram Wildlife Sanctuary in India and the Central Karakoram National Park in Pakistan.

Sandia National Laboratories organised conferences where military experts and environmentalists from both India and Pakistan and also from other countries were invited to present joint papers. Kent L. Biringer, a researcher at Cooperative Monitoring Center of Sandia Labs suggested setting up Siachen Science Center, a high-altitude research centre where scientists and researchers from both the countries can carry out research activities related to glaciology, geology, atmospheric sciences and other related fields.

== In popular culture ==
In the 2018 Hollywood movie Mission: Impossible – Fallout, a rogue agent plants nuclear bombs at the base of the Siachen Glacier. The scene was actually filmed in New Zealand due to the Indian government denying permission to film in Kashmir.

== See also ==
- Batura Glacier
- Colonel Narendra Kumar
- NJ9842
- Indira Col
- Robert D. Hodgson
- Baltoro Glacier
- Saltoro Kangri
- Sia La
- Bilafond La
- Gyong La
- Actual Ground Position Line
- 2016 Siachen Glacier avalanche
- Siachen Muztagh
