= List of mountains in India =

== Highest major summits in India ==
Summits of India with at least 500 meters of topographic prominence
Ranks		Name / Short name (if applicable)	Height		Range	Prominence (m) (Note: The table below only lists the 100 summits with at least 500 m (1,640 ft) prominence. A few spectacular peaks such as Abi Gamin (prominence of 217m) and Gimmigela Chuli (prominence of 432m) are therefore not included in the table.) (Note: Peakbagger is used as a reference for this column.)	Coordinates	State
National	Global	Name / Short name (if applicable)	In meters (Note: Hartemann & Hauptman 2005, pp. 233–244 is used as a reference for most peaks. Peaks not in the citation are referenced separately.)	In ft	Range	Prominence (m)	Coordinates	State
1	3	Kangchenjunga	8,586	28,169	Himalayas	3,922	27°42′09″N 88°08′48″E	Sikkim
2	23	Nanda Devi	7,816	25,643	Garhwal Himalaya	3,139	30°22′33″N 79°58′15″E	Uttarakhand
3	29	Kamet	7,756	25,446	Garhwal Himalaya	2,817	30°55′12″N 79°35′30″E	Uttarakhand
4	31	Saltoro Kangri / K10	7,742	25,400	Saltoro Karakoram	2,160	35°23′57″N 76°50′53″E *	Ladakh
5	35	Saser Kangri I / K22	7,672	25,171	Saser Karakoram	2,304	34°52′00″N 77°45′09″E	Ladakh
6	48	Mamostong Kangri / K35	7,516	24,659	Rimo Karakoram	1,803	35°08′31″N 77°34′39″E	Ladakh
7	49	Saser Kangri II E	7,513	24,649	Saser Karakoram	1,450	34°48′17″N 77°48′24″E	Ladakh
8	51	Saser Kangri III	7,495	24,594	Saser Karakoram	850	34°50′44″N 77°47′06″E	Ladakh
9	56	Teram Kangri I	7,462	24,482	Siachen Karakoram	1,702	35°34′48″N 77°04′42″E	Ladakh
10	57	Jongsong Peak	7,462	24,482	Kangchenjunga Himalaya	1,298	27°52′54″N 88°08′09″E	Sikkim
11	61	Nanda Devi East(Sunanda Devi)(mountain)	7,434	24,370	Garhwal Himalaya Himalaya	1,978	35°17′45″N 77°01′20″E	Uttarakhand
12	65	Kabru N	7,412	24,318	Kangchenjunga Himalaya	780	27°38′02″N 88°07′00″E	Sikkim
13	69	Ghent Kangri	7,401	24,281	Saltoro Karakoram	1,493	35°31′04″N 76°48′02″E	Ladakh
14	71	Rimo I	7,385	24,229	Rimo Karakoram	1,438	35°21′18″N 77°22′08″E	Ladakh
15	73	Teram Kangri III	7,382	24,219	Siachen Karakoram	520	35°35′59″N 77°02′53″E	Ladakh
16	76	Kirat Chuli	7,365	24,163	Kangchenjunga Himalaya	1,168	27°47′29″N 88°11′50″E	Sikkim
17	92	Mana Peak	7,272	23,858	Garhwal Himalaya	730	30°52′50″N 79°36′55″E	Uttarakhand
18	96	Apsarasas Kangri	7,245	23,770	Siachen Karakoram	635	35°32′19″N 77°08′55″E	Ladakh
19	97	Mukut Parbat	7,242	23,760	Garhwal Himalaya	840	30°56′57″N 79°34′12″E	Uttarakhand
20	98	Rimo III	7,233	23,730	Rimo Karakoram	615	35°22′31″N 77°21′42″E	Ladakh
21	108	Singhi Kangri	7,202	23,629	Siachen Karakoram	790	35°35′59″N 76°59′01″E	Ladakh
22		Hardeol	7,161	23,494	Kumaon Himalaya	1,291	30°34′N 80°01′E	Uttarakhand
23		Chaukhamba I	7,138	23,418	Garhwal Himalaya	1,594	30°44′53″N 79°17′19″E	Uttarakhand
24		Nun-Kun	7,135	23,408	Zanskar Himalaya	2,404	33°59′N 76°01′E	Ladakh
25		Pauhunri	7,128	23,385	Sikkim Himalaya	2,035	27°57′N 88°51′E	Sikkim
26		Pathibhara	7,123	23,369	Kangchenjunga Himalaya	900	27°49′N 88°10′E	Sikkim
27		Trisul I	7,120	23,359	Kumaon Himalaya	1,616	30°18′57″N 79°46′36″E	Uttarakhand
28		Satopanth	7,075	23,212	Garhwal Himalaya	1,250	30°50′45″N 79°12′48″E	Uttarakhand
29		Tirsuli	7,074	23,209	Garhwal Himalaya	674	30°35′N 80°01′E	Uttarakhand
30		Chong Kumdang Ri	7,071	23,199	Rimo Karakoram	851	35°12′N 77°35′E	Ladakh
31		Dunagiri	7,066	23,182	Garhwal Himalaya	1,346	30°30′55″N 79°51′56″E	Uttarakhand
32		Kangto	7,060	23,163	Assam Himalaya	2,195	27°51′57″N 92°31′53″E	Arunachal Pradesh
33		Nyegyi Kansang	7,047	23,120	Assam Himalaya	1,752	27°56′N 92°40′E	Arunachal Pradesh
34		Padmanabh	7,030	23,064	Rimo Karakoram	870	35°26′N 77°11′E	Ladakh
35		Shudu Tsenpa	7,024	23,045	Sikkim Himalaya	524	27°56′N 88°52′E	Sikkim
36		Chamshen Kangri / Tughmo Zarpo	7,017	23,022	Saser Karakoram	657	34°53′N 77°48′E	Ladakh
37		Aq Tash	7,016	23,018	Rimo Karakoram	1,176	35°05′N 77°38′E	Ladakh
38		Chong Kumdang Ri II	7,004	22,979	Rimo Karakoram	624	35°12′N 77°32′E	Ladakh
39		Rishi Pahar	6,992	22,940	Kumaon Himalaya	622	30°31′57″N 79°59′52″E	Uttarakhand
40		Thalay Sagar	6,984	22,913	Garhwal Himalaya	1,004	30°51′36″N 78°59′45″E	Uttarakhand
41		Mount Lakshmi	6,983	22,910	Rimo Karakoram	800	35°27′N 77°10′E	Ladakh
42		Kedarnath Main	6,968	22,769	Garhwal Himalaya	1,400	30°47′50″N 79°04′03″E	Uttarakhand
43		Langpo	6,965	22,851	Sikkim Himalaya	560	27°51′13″N 88°11′47″E	Sikkim
44		Saraswati Parvat I / Saraswati Peak	6,940	22,769	Garhwal Himalaya	900	30°01′N 79°30′E	Uttarakhand
45		Shahi Kangri	6,934	22,749	Central Tibetan Plateau	1,644	35°10′N 77°50′E	Ladakh
46		Sri Kailash	6,932	22,743	Garhwal Himalaya	1,092	31°01′03″N 79°10′39″E	Uttarakhand
47		Kalanka	6,931	22,739	Garhwal Himalaya	850	30°30′8″N 79°56′20″E	Uttarakhand
48		Chorten Nyima Ri	6,927	22,726	Sikkim Himalaya	807	27°57′00″N 88°10′42″E	Sikkim
49		Saf Minal / P. 6911	6,911	22,673	Garhwal Himalaya	531	30°31′N 79°58′E	Uttarakhand
50		Panchchuli II	6,904	22,651	Kumaon Himalaya	1,614	30°13′N 80°26′E	Uttarakhand

== Other significant mountains ==
- Agastyamalai
- Anamudi
- Anginda
- Apharwat Peak
- Bamba Dhura
- Bandarpunch
- Betlingchhip
- Blue Mountain
- Brammah
- Burphu Dhura
- Chachi Mug
- Chandrashila
- Changuch
- Chaudhara
- Chiling Peaks
- Chiring We
- Churdhar
- Deo Tibba
- Deomali
- Doddabetta
- Doli Gutta
- Gang Chua
- Gangotri Group
- Gauri Parbat
- Gimmigela Chuli
- Girnar
- Gori Chen
- Gurudongmar
- Guru Shikhar
- Gya
- Hanuman Tibba
- Harmukh
- Hathi Parbat
- Indrasan
- Japfü
- Jorkanden
- Kalrayan hills
- Kalsubai
- Kang Yatze
- Kangju Kangri
- Kinnaur Kailash
- Kodachadri
- Kolahoi Peak
- Kolaribetta
- Kolukkumalai
- Kumara Parvatha
- Kun Peak
- Maiktoli
- Manirang
- Meesapulimala
- Mentok (mountain)
- Mol Len
- Mukurthi
- Mulkila
- Mullayanagiri
- Nag Tibba
- Nagalaphu
- Nanda Ghunti
- Nanda Gond
- Nanda Khat
- Nanda Kot
- Nanda Pal
- Nilkantha
- Nun Peak
- Om Parvat
- Pandim
- Parasnath
- Parbati Parbat
- Plateau Peak
- Pichalbetta
- Rajrambha
- Reo Purgyil
- Sangthang
- Saramati
- Shevaroy hills
- Shilla
- Sickle Moon Peak
- Siniolchu
- Sispara
- Sitamma Konda
- Suj Tilla East
- Suj Tilla West
- Sujarkamiltan
- Suli Top
- Sunset Peak
- Swargarohini
- Tatakooti Peak
- Tsangyang Gyatso
- Tempü
- Matanga Hill

=== Mountain ranges ===
- Himalayas
- Karakoram
- Barail Range
- Purvanchal Range
- Arakan Yoma
- Western Ghats
- Eastern Ghats
- Vindhyas
- Aravali
- Satpura

== Lists by state or region ==
Lists of mountains by state or region of India:

- List of peaks in Himachal Pradesh
- List of mountains in Kerala
- List of mountain peaks of Ladakh
- List of mountain peaks of Maharashtra
- List of mountains in Nagaland
- List of Himalayan peaks of Uttarakhand
- List of mountains and hills of the West Bengal
- List of peaks in the Western Ghats

== See also ==
- Geography of India
- List of mountain passes of India
- List of Indian states and territories by highest point

== Bibliography ==
- Bisht, Ramesh Chandra (2008), International Encyclopaedia Of Himalayas (5 Vols. Set), Mittal Publications, ISBN 978-81-8324-265-3
- Hartemann, Frederic; Hauptman, Robert (2005), The Mountain Encyclopedia: An A to Z Compendium of Over 2,250 Terms, Concepts, Ideas, and People, Taylor Trade Publishing, ISBN 978-1-4617-0331-0
- Kapadia, Harish (2010), Siachen Glacier: The Battle of Roses, Rupa & Company, ISBN 978-81-291-1687-1
- Kapadia, Harish (1999), Across Peaks & Passes in Garhwal Himalaya, Indus Publishing, ISBN 978-81-7387-097-2
- Kapadia, Harish (1999), Across Peaks & Passes in Ladakh, Zanskar & East Karakoram, Indus Publishing, ISBN 978-81-7387-100-9
- Kapadia, Harish (1999), Across Peaks & Passes in Kumaun Himalaya, Indus Publishing, ISBN 978-81-7387-096-5
- Kapadia, Harish (2001), Across Peaks & Passes in Darjeeling & Sikkim, Indus Publishing, ISBN 978-81-7387-126-9
- World 7200-meter Peaks, peakbagger.com
- Weare, Gary (2009), Trekking in the Indian Himalaya, Lonely Planet, ISBN 978-1-74059-768-5, archived from the original on 17 August 2015
