= List of mountain peaks of Ladakh =

Ladakh is a newly formed union territory of India. This northernmost part of India had some of the highest mountain peaks in the world. Many of them are unclimbed and some of them unnamed. A large number of peaks in Ladakh are still not open for climbing due to security reasons, as this region borders Tibet Autonomous Region of the People's Republic of China in the North and East and Line Of Control (LOC) and The India–Pakistan AGPL Actual Ground Position Line. That divides current positions of Indian and Pakistani military posts and troops in the West. There are five major mountain range in Ladakh From South The Great Himalaya range, Zanskar range, Ladakh range, Pangong range and Karakoram range.

== Highest major summits ==
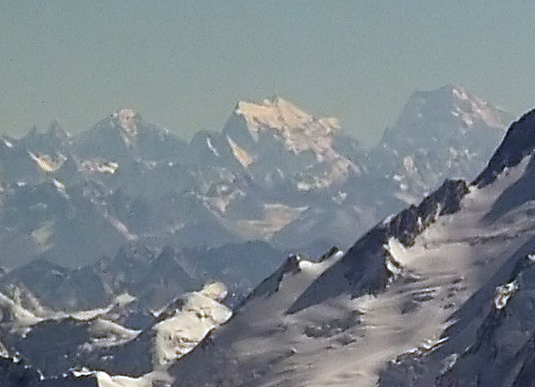
Saltoro Kangri, at right.

Following is a list of highest peaks of Ladakh:

Name of the peak	Altitude (meters)	Mountain range (sub-range)	River valley	Glacier
Saltoro Kangri	7742	Karakoram (Saltoro range)	Saltoro Valley	
Saser Kangri I	7672	Karakoram (Saser Muztagh)	Shyok River, Nubra River	
Mamostong Kangri	7516	Karakoram		
Saser Kangri II	7513	Karakoram		
Saser Kangri III	7495	Karakoram		
Teram Kangri I	7462	Karakoram		
K-12	7428	Karakoram		
Saser Kangri IV	7415	Karakoram		
Teram Kangri II	7407	Karakoram		
Ghent Kangri	7401	Karakoram		
Rimo I	7385	Karakoram		
Teram Kangri III	7380	Karakoram		
Ghent Kangri 2	7343	Karakoram		
Saser Kangri V(Plateau peak)	7287	Karakoram		
Apsarasas Kangri I	7245	Karakoram		
Apsarasas Kangri II	7239	Karakoram		
Rimo III	7233	Karakoram (Rimo Muztagh)		
Singhi Kangri	7207	Karakoram		
Rimo IV	7169	Karakoram (Rimo Muztagh)		
Mt Hardinge	7093			
Chong Kumdan Ri I	7071			
Sakang Peak	7040			
Padmanabh	7030			
Skyampoche Ri (Aq Tash)	7016			
Chong Kumdan Ri II	7004			
Chamshen Kangri	6950			
Mahashrung	6940			
Chhushku Kangri	6925			
Apsarasas Kangri III	6882			
Thangman Kangri	6864			
Terong Kangri	6863			
La Yongma Ri	6826			
Argan Kangri	6789			
Chumik	6754			
The Hawk	6754			
Kangju Kangri	6725			
Lungser Kangri	6666			
Chamser Kangri	6622			
Pyramid Peak	6470			
Kury Kangri	6447			
Chiling I	6349			
Crane	6330			
Lharimo	6309			

== See also ==
- Geography of Ladakh
- Tourism in Ladakh
- List of mountains in India
- List of mountain passes of India
- List of Indian states and territories by highest point
