= Muztagh =

Muztagh may refer to:

The Greater Karakoram ranges

- Baltoro Muztagh (Chinese: 巴尔托洛慕士塔格山)
- Batura Muztagh (Chinese: 巴托拉慕士塔格山)
- Hispar Muztagh (Chinese: 海斯帕尔慕士塔格山)
- Panmah Muztagh (Chinese: 潘玛慕士塔格山)
- Rimo Muztagh (Chinese: 里莫慕士塔格山)
- Saser Muztagh (Chinese: 莎瑟慕士塔格山)
- Siachen Muztagh (Chinese: 锡亚琴慕士塔格山)

Two mountain passes in the Karakoram, the western and the eastern

- Mustagh Passes (Chinese: 木斯塔山口) in the Baltoro Muztagh

The Mountains

- Muztagh Ata (Chinese: 慕士塔格峰) in the Pamir Mountains
- Muztagh Tower (Chinese: 慕士塔格塔峰) in the Baltoro Muztagh
- Ulugh Muztagh (Chinese: 木孜塔格峰) in the Kunlun Mountains
