= Aq Tash =

- Location within Ladakh Location within India

Highest point
- Elevation: 7,016 m (23,018 ft)
- Prominence: 1,176 m ↓ (5,840 m)
- Isolation: 8.53 km (5.30 mi) to Mamostong Kangri
- Listing: Mountains of India
- Coordinates: 35°04′39″N 77°38′14″E

Geography
- Location: Ladakh, (India)
- Parent range: Rimo Muztagh (Karakorum)

Climbing
- First ascent: 6 August 1993 by Nobuo Yamamoto and Yasufumi Mizote

Aq Tash is mountain, 7,016 m, in the Rimo Muztagh, part of the Karakorum.

== Location and features ==
The Aq Tash lies in India near its disputed border with Pakistan. A mountain arête runs northwest from Aq Tash to Mamostong Kangri, 8.53 km (5.30 mi) away.

== Climbing history ==
The Aq Tash was first ascended on 6 August 1993 by Nobuo Yamamoto and Yasufumi Mizote, members of a Japanese expedition.

Two days later they were followed to the summit by Prem Singh, P.T. Sherpa, Mohan Singh, Khem Raj, Sange Sherpa, Wangchuk Sherpa and Hira Ram, members of an Indian expedition.
