= Thangman Kangri =

Mountain peak

- Location within India Location within Ladakh

Highest point
- Elevation: 6,864 m (22,520 ft)
- Prominence: 604 m (1,982 ft)
- Coordinates: 35°08′48″N 77°37′22″E

Geography
- Location: Ladakh

Climbing
- First ascent: No records

Thangman Kangri is one of highest peak in the remote Rimo Muztagh, a subrange of the Karakoram range in Ladakh union territory of India.

== Location ==
The peak is at 6,864 m (22,520 ft) above sea level, situated just 4.15 km east of the Mamostong Kangri, to which it is connected by a ridge. In between there is a 6,260 m (20,540 ft) high saddle. The mountain is flanked by the South Chong Kumdan Glacier to the north and the Thangman Glacier to the south. The prominence is at 604 m (1,982 ft).

== Climbing history ==
There are no documented ascents of Thangman Kangri.
