= Rimo =

Rimo is both a mountain in the Karakoram and the name of the subrange in which it lies:

- Rimo I, the main summit of the mountain
- Rimo Muztagh, the full name of the subrange
