= Sophia Pang =

Singaporean adventurer

- Born: 1972 (age 53–54); Singapore
- Education: Nanyang Business School
- Occupation: Adventurer
- Known for: First woman from Singapore to reach South Pole

Sophia Pang (born 1972) is a Singaporean adventurer. She is the first woman from Singapore to reach the South Pole.

== Biography ==
Pang graduated from Nanyang Business School in 1994. Before Pang left on her Antarctic expedition, she used to teach classes as a freelance fitness instructor.

In August 2008, she found an online application for women to represent their country in Antarctica and she decided to apply. She eventually beat out 70 other applicants to take the spot to travel to the South Pole. She joined a team, that was later funded by Kaspersky Lab, called the Kaspersky Commonwealth Antarctic Expedition, and which included women from New Zealand, Jamaica, India, United Kingdom, Cyprus, Ghana and Brunei. Pang was the person who secured the Kaspersky sponsorship for the team by contacting their Singapore distributor.

Pang underwent a five-month training program to get ready for the trip. The expedition left on 22 November 2009 from Messner Start, which is around 900 kilometers from the pole. Pang and her team reached the South Pole at around 10 am, Singapore Time, on 30 December 2009.

Pang was inducted into the Singapore Women's Hall of Fame in 2014.
