= Matanga Hill =

Hill in Karnataka, India

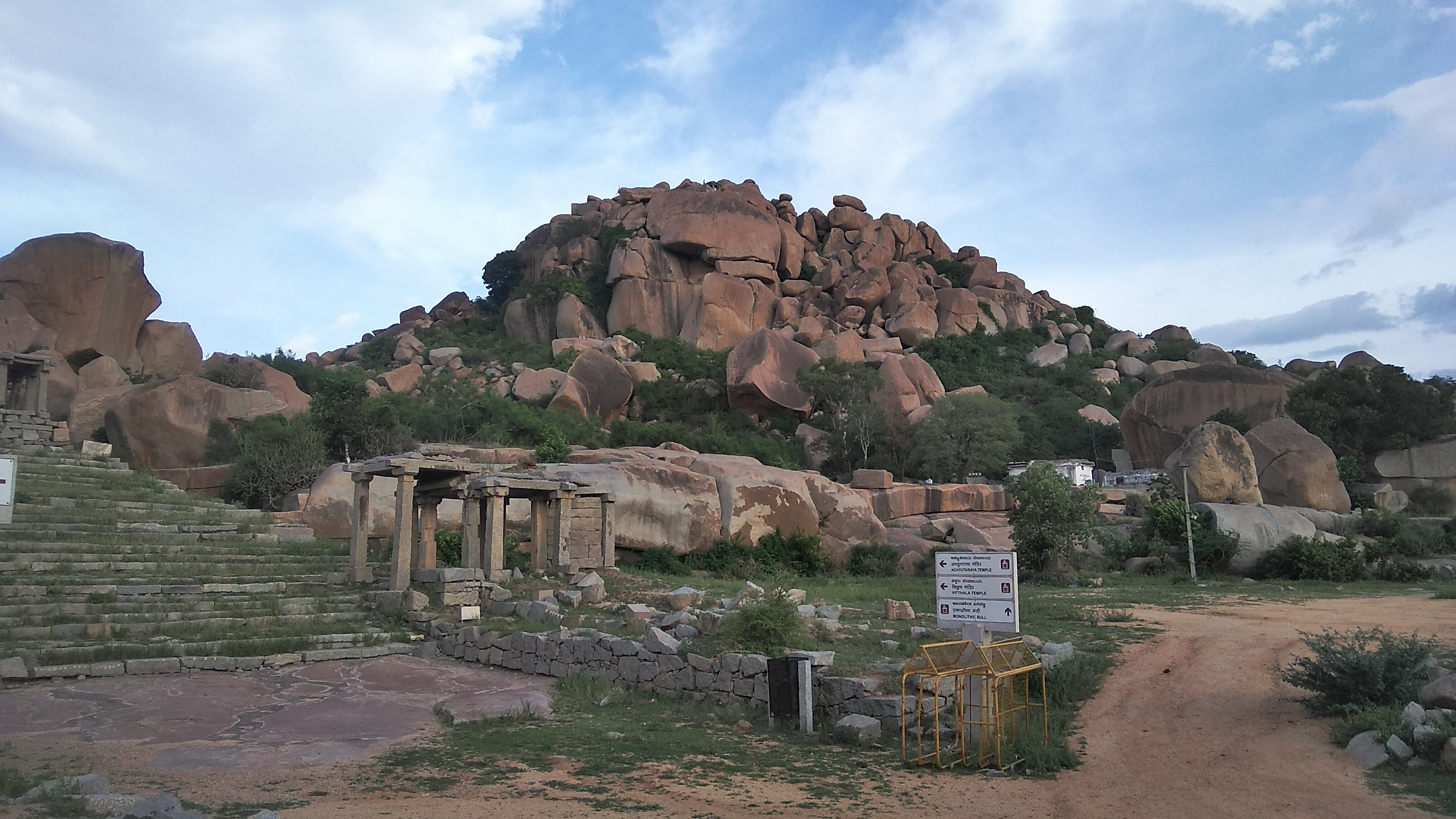
- Matanga Hill viewed from the nearby village

Highest point
- Coordinates: 15°19′N 76°28′E

Geography
- Location within India
- Location: Karnataka, India

Matanga Hill, also known as Rishyamuka Parvata, is a rocky hill in the Matanga hill range, Hampi, Karnataka, southern India. The hill is supposedly a holy land from the Hindu Ramayana epic. The Matanga hill range served as a natural boundary of Hampi (Vijayanagara), which was the capital city of its namesake empire. Since the hills were a defense against attacks from outside lands, the Sangama brothers purposely put Vijayanagara there.

== History ==
The first solidified rocks in all of India were found at the Matanga hill range. These rocks are yellow.

Matanga Hill is a holy site, and thus has been a center of Hinduism for centuries. The hill was home to many more temples as well as bazaars and shops along long streets than there are today during the Vijayanagara time, before the empire was defeated by the Deccan Sultans from what is now central India. The city was plundered and burned to the ground.

Hampi and the Matanga Hill temples are now a UNESCO World Heritage Site (since 1986), as they were rediscovered by the British Raj in the year 1800. UNESCO built hotels, hice, restaurants and small stores under a jurisdiction on ancient Hindu relics in 2012, at the cost of the homes of 300 people and the Virupaksha Temple.

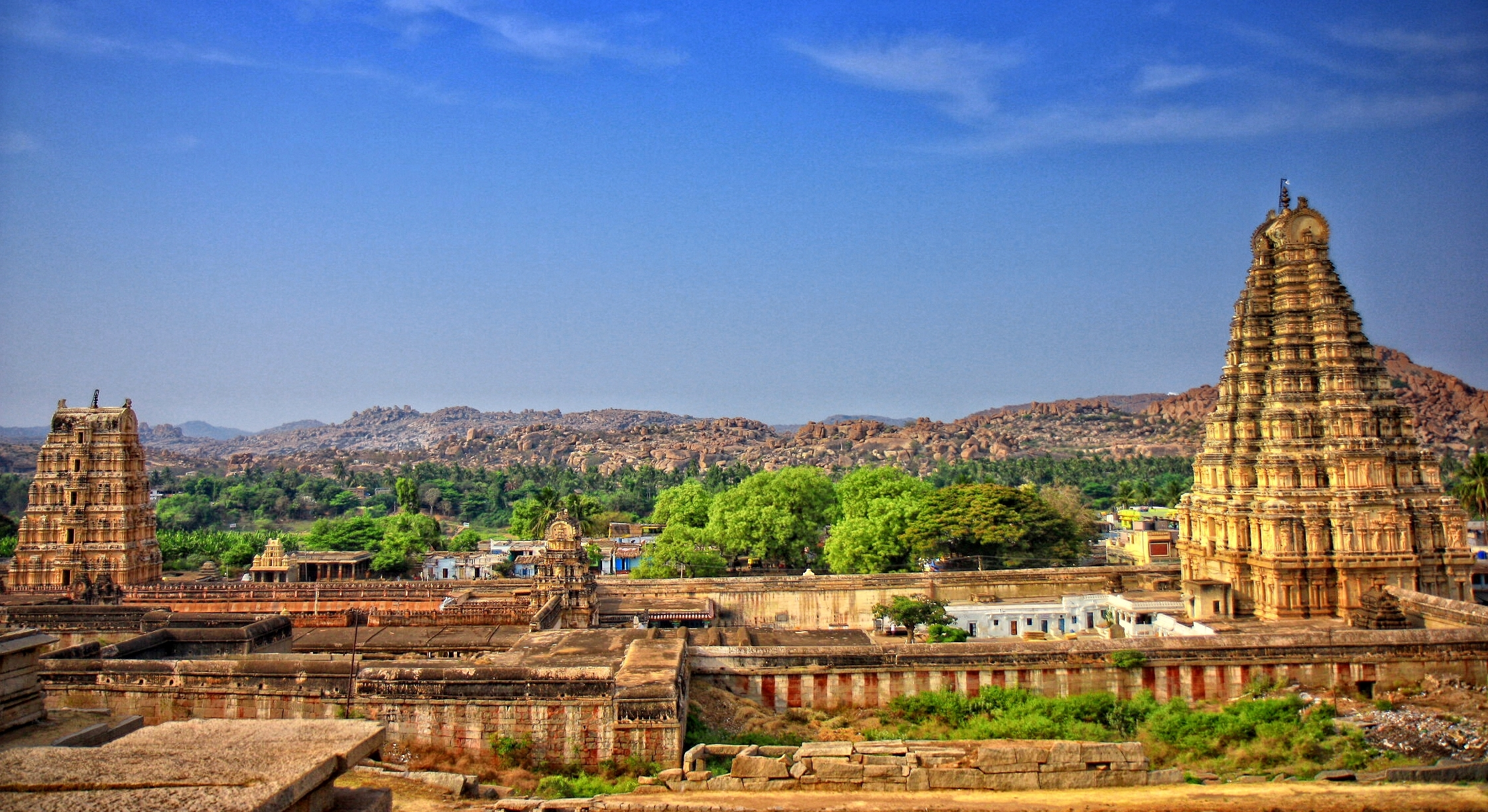
Virupaksha Temple, before it was destroyed by UNESCO.

== In Hinduism ==
=== The legend of Matanga Hill ===
According to Hindu mythology, the Matanga Hill was the home of a hermit called Matanga. Once The monkey-king Vali (Son of Lord Indra) killed the demon Dundubhi (Looks like buffalo) and thrown him. The dead body of demon Dundubhi passed over Matanga parvat and blood of that demon dropped on Matanga oarvat. Maharshi Matanga got angry and The hermit then cast a curse on the monkey that would materialize if he went up the hill. Later, the son of the demon wanted to avenge his dad, so he drove Vali into a cave at the hill. His brother, Sugriva, stood guard. After convincing himself that Vali had died, he left, causing Vali to wrongly arrest him for treason and banish him from the kingdom. Sugriva, in an act of desperation, then hid his general on a hill that Vali did not have access to. He was eventually saved from oppression by Rama the god, and appointed ruler of the monkey-kingdom. Vali was killed by Rama in the ordeal.

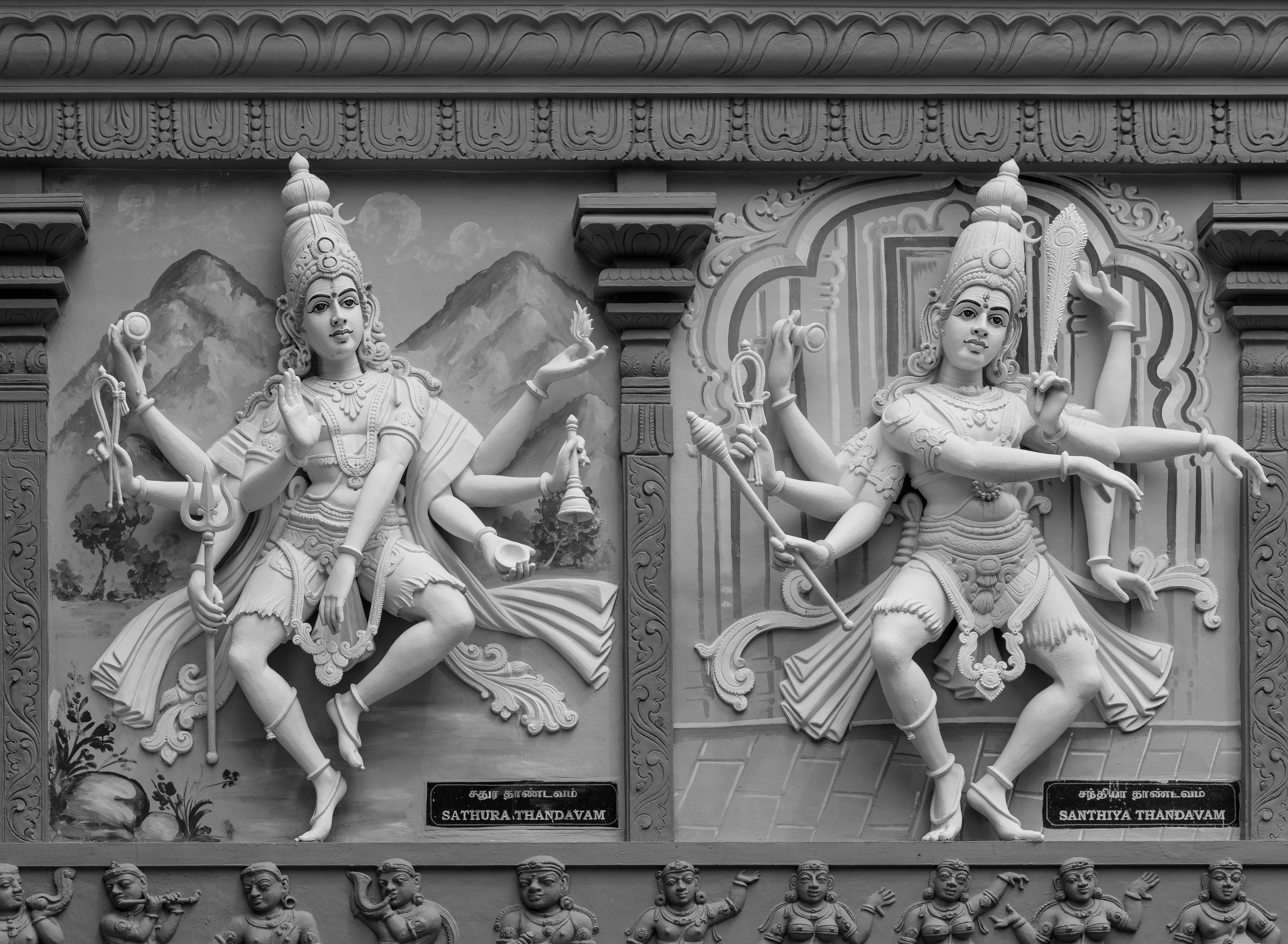
Shiva dancing

=== Temples ===
Near the hill, and visible from the summit, there are the Achyutaraya, Vishnu, and Hanuman temples, and at the summit, there is a viewpoint temple, the Virabhadra temple. Virabhadra is an embodiment of Shiva, who the locals once worshipped.

Matanga Hill was likely home to more Hindu temples during the south Indian Vijayanagara empire in the 14th, 15th and 16th centuries, but many of them have been in ruins since 1565, when the Deccan Sultans came from the north and ended the Vijayanagara Empire.

== Geography and climate ==
The hill is in the state of Karnataka, southern India, somewhat near Bangalore (Bengaluru), and close to the south end of the Deccan Plateau (still on the plateau). It is well within the tropics, consistent with its climate, at 15 N, 76 E. The hill has abundant plant life towards the bottom, with a rocky top. The river Tungabhadra passes near it and is visible from the summit. It is also surrounded by farmland that uses the Tungabhadra as a water source.

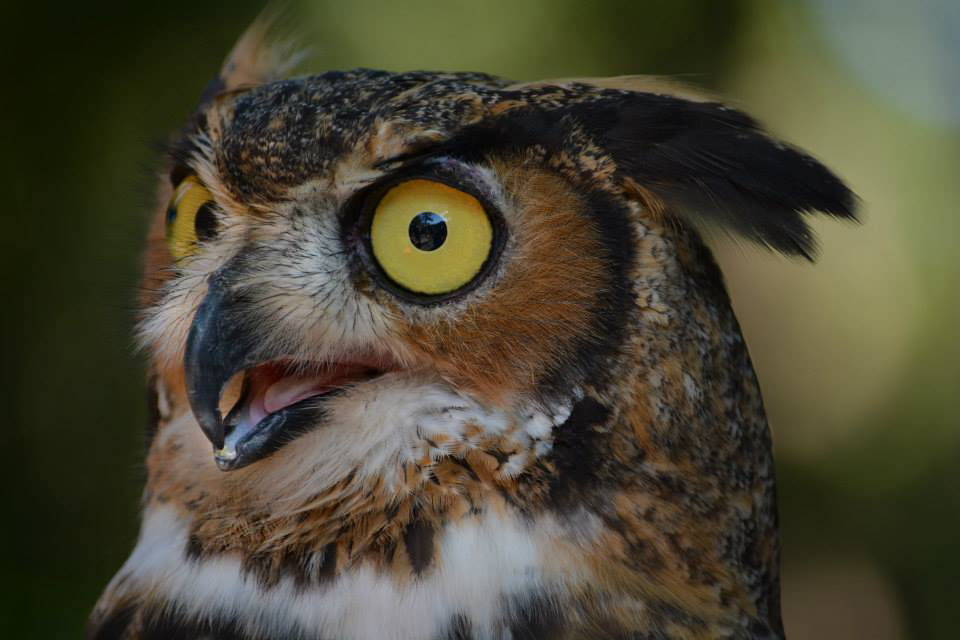
A great horned owl

The area has much tropical birdlife, and also possesses quails and great horned owls. Coconut trees populate the landscape.

It has characteristics of a hot semidesert (Kӧppen BSh) and a monsoon (Am) climate, being extremely hot (up to 40 C) from March to May, with winters (Oct-Feb) being warm to hot and extremely dry. The monsoon season (May-Oct) is the only time when significant precipitation occurs and there is none from January to March, making March an extremely severe month. The area is extremely humid (up to 70 F dew point) during the monsoon season. The average lowest temperature to be observed in a year is 56 °F (13 °C), and the average highest is 108 °F (42 °C).

== See also ==
- List of mountains in India
