= Singhi Kangri =

Peak in the Karakoram range, located on the border between China and India

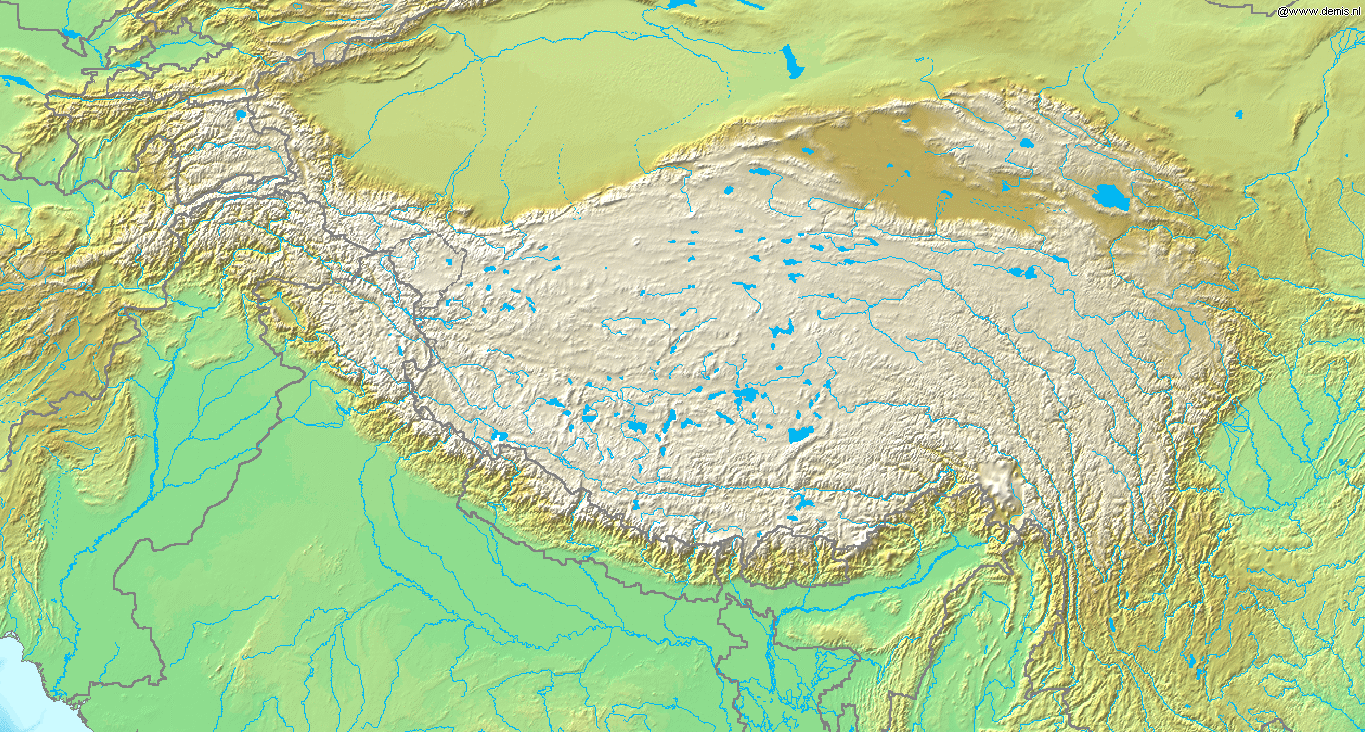
- Location within Tibetan Plateau

Highest point
- Elevation: 7,202 m (23,629 ft); Ranked 107th
- Prominence: 790 m (2,590 ft)
- Parent peak: Teram Kangri III
- Listing: Mountains of China; Mountains of India
- Coordinates: 35°35′59″N 76°59′01″E

Geography
- Location: China border with the Siachen Glacier region India
- Parent range: Karakoram

Climbing
- First ascent: 1976 by a Japanese team
- Easiest route: snow/ice climb

Singhi Kangri is a 7,202 m (23,629 ft) peak in the Karakoram range. It is located on the border between China and India. The mountain was first climbed in 1976 by a Japanese expedition.

== See also ==
- List of highest mountains on Earth
