= Kaspersky Commonwealth Antarctic Expedition =

2009 expedition to Antarctica

The Kaspersky Commonwealth Antarctic Expedition was a Commonwealth of Nations expedition in which seven women from six Commonwealth member countries skied to the South Pole in 2009 to celebrate the 60th anniversary of the founding of the Commonwealth. They had been selected among over 800 candidates.

It took the expedition 38 days to reach the Amundsen–Scott South Pole Station, skiing six to ten hours a day, covering an average of 24 km a day. In total, they covered 904 km. They reached their destination on December 29.

The team took a day off on Christmas Day. Team leader Felicity Aston, of the United Kingdom, explained: "Half of the team don’t usually celebrate Christmas so the others are having great fun teaching them Christmas songs and explaining why they have to hang their smelly socks outside the tent on Christmas Eve".

The expedition marked several firsts. Era Al-Sufri, Reena Kaushal Dharmshaktu, Sophia Pang, Stephanie Solomonides, and Kylie Wakelin were, respectively, the first Bruneian woman, the first Indian woman, the first Singaporean woman, the first Cypriot, and the first New Zealand woman to ski to the South Pole.

== Expedition members ==
=== Completed the trek ===
- United Kingdom – Felicity Aston (expedition leader)
- Brunei – Era Al-Sufri
- India – Reena Kaushal Dharmshaktu
- Singapore – Sophia Pang
- Cyprus – Stephanie Solomonides
- United Kingdom – Helen Turton (replaced Barbara Yanney)
- New Zealand – Kylie Wakelin

=== Pulled out ===
- Jamaica – Kim-Marie Spence (pulled out on the third day, due to frostbite on her fingers)
- Ghana – Barbara Yanney (contracted malaria before departure. Recovered, but was unable to take part)
