= British Antarctic Monument Trust =

- Abbreviation: BAMT
- Formation: 2008
- Type: charity
- Purpose: Promote the achievements of members of the British Antarctic Survey who have carried out hazardous duties in the pursuit of scientific knowledge within the British Antarctic Territory.
- Headquarters: London, UK
- Chairman: Roderick Rhys Jones
- Website: www.antarctic-monument.org

The British Antarctic Monument Trust is a charitable trust established in 2008 to commemorate the men and women of the British Antarctic Survey and its predecessor, the Falkland Islands Dependencies Survey, who undertook hazardous work in pursuit of scientific knowledge in the British Antarctic Territory.

The Trust maintains a complete record of those who have died in the British Antarctic Territory since Britain established its first permanent base at Port Lockroy in 1944.

The Trust’s principal activities have included creating monuments and memorials to those who lost their lives and securing recognition for them through Antarctic place names.

== Monuments ==
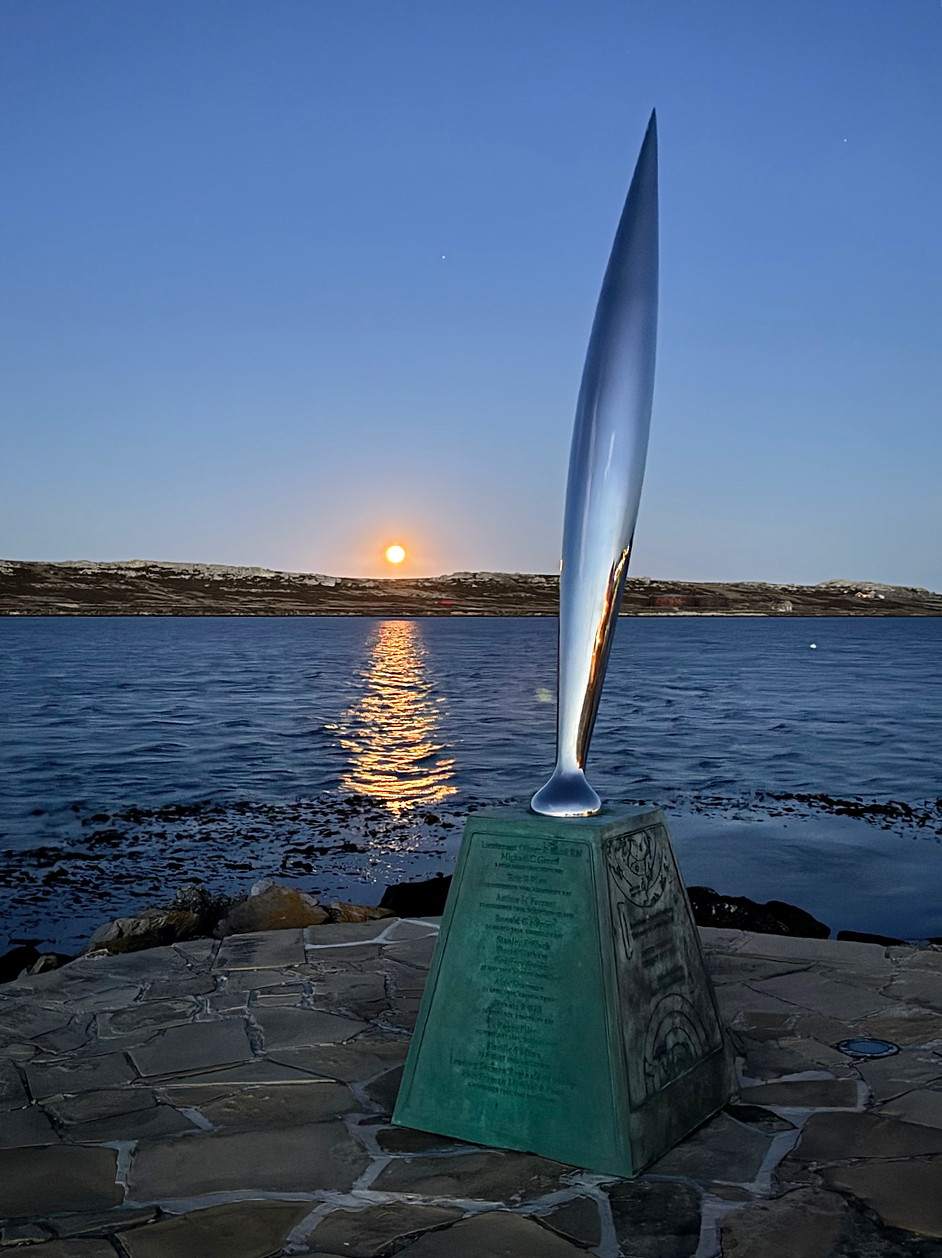
Southern Antarctic Monument at Stanley, Falkland Islands.

The British Antarctic Monument was created by sculptor Oliver Barratt, who also designed the Everest Memorial.

It consists of two complementary sculptures: a northern sculpture outside the Scott Polar Research Institute in Cambridge and a southern sculpture 8,000 miles away in Stanley, Falkland Islands.

The northern sculpture is made from British oak and represents the mould from which the southern sculpture, a stainless-steel needle, was formed. The northern sculpture was unveiled on 12 May 2011 by Oliver Barratt and Roderick Rhys Jones, Chairman of the British Antarctic Monument Trust. At the ceremony, Professor Julian A. Dowdeswell, Director of the Scott Polar Research Institute, welcomed the friends and relatives of those who had died in Antarctica.

The Southern Sculpture was unveiled and dedicated by the Bishop of the Falkland Islands on 25 February 2015.

The long-term curation of the monuments has been assured by their accession into the permanent collection of the Scott Polar Research Institute for the care of the northern part of the monument, and the Falkland Islands Museum and National Trust for the southern part of the monument.

== Memorials ==
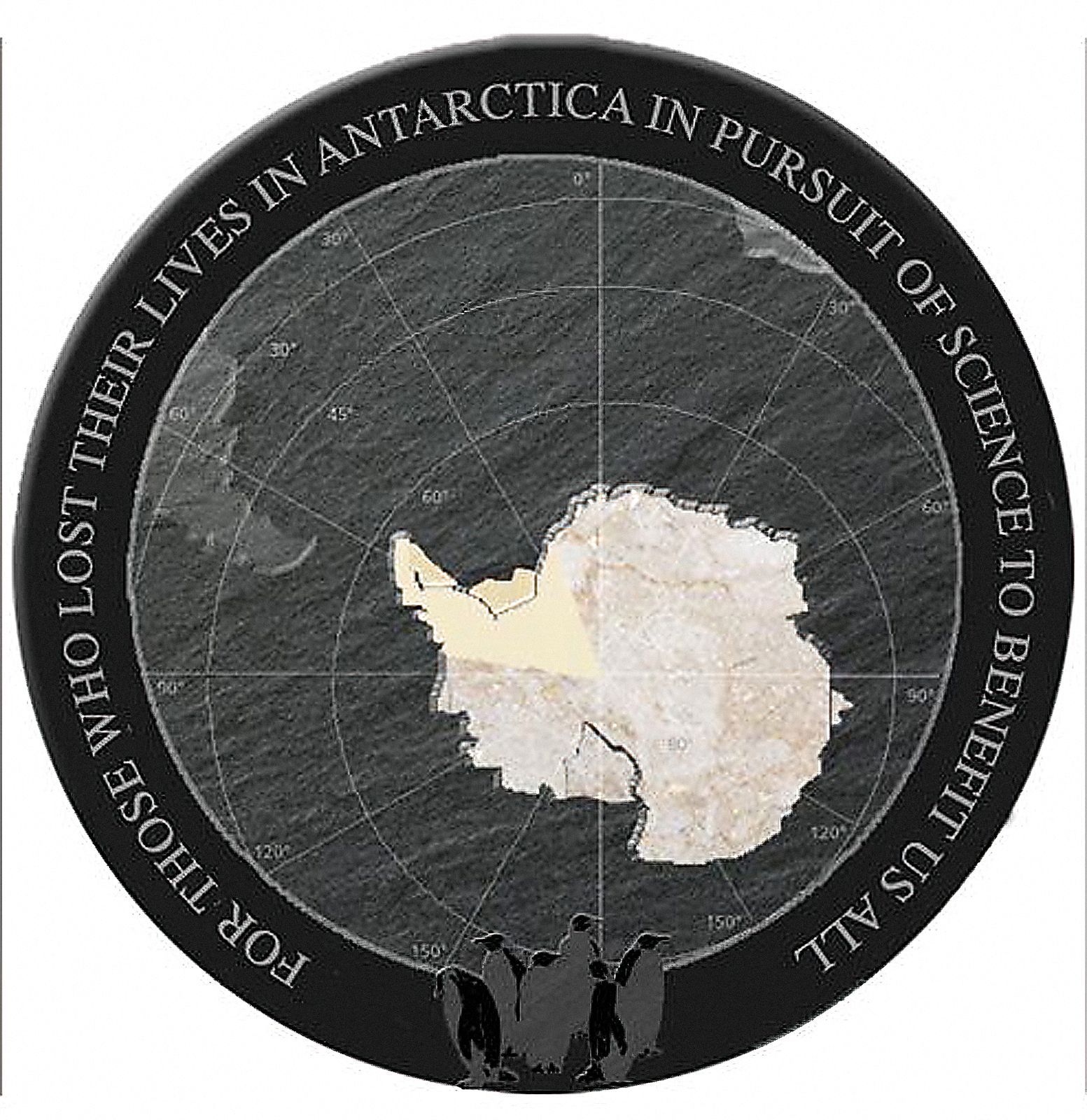
Antarctic Memorial Tablet in St Paul's Cathedral.

The trust has also placed The Antarctic Memorial Tablet in the crypt of St Paul's Cathedral. It was dedicated by Canon Treasurer Mark Oakley on 10 May 2011. The tablet has the inscription "For those who lost their lives in Antarctica in pursuit of science to benefit us all". The memorial was designed by Graeme Wilson and the sculptor Fergus Wessel.

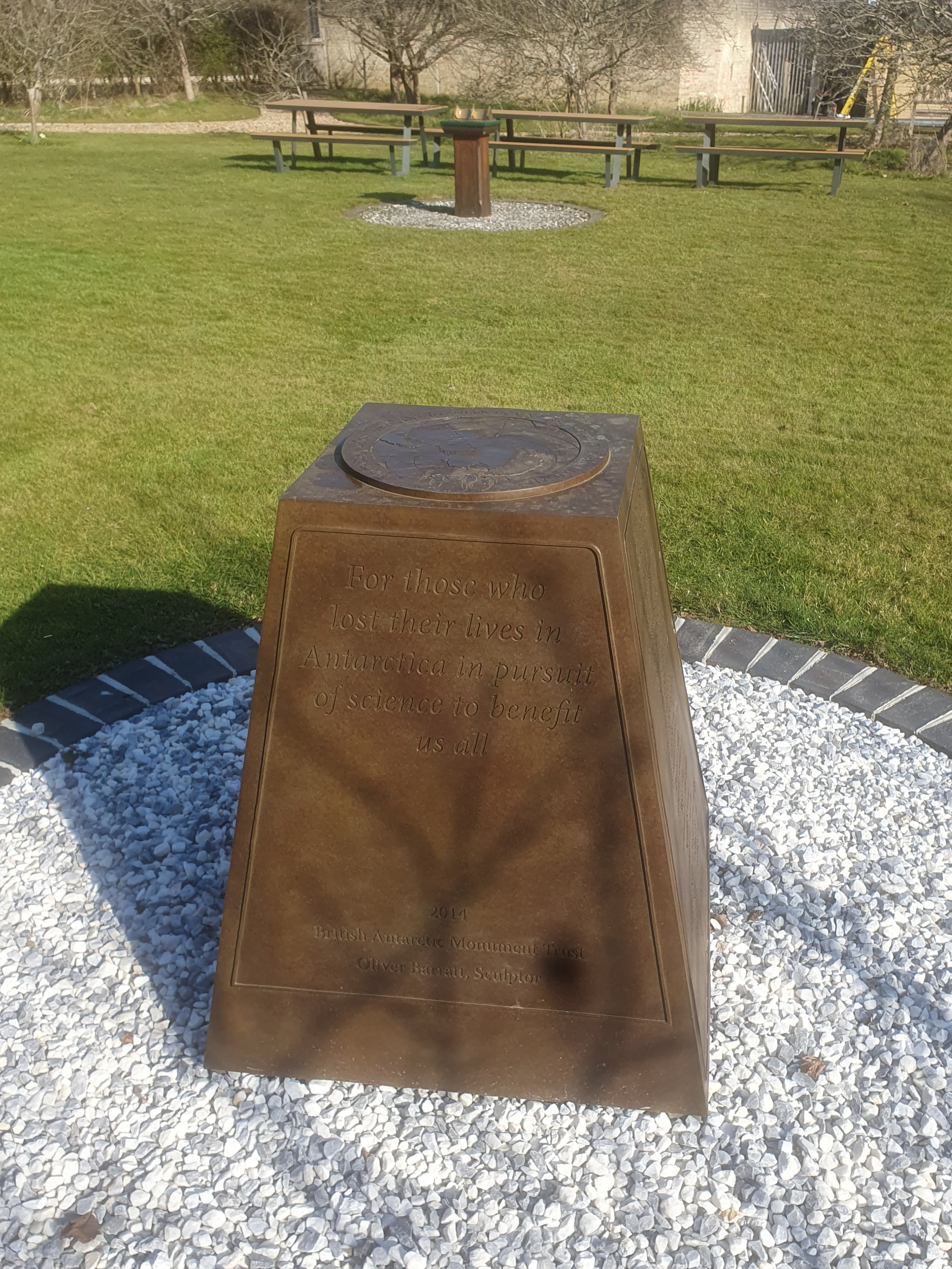
Antarctic Memorial Plinth in the Memorial Orchard at the British Antarctic Survey Headquarters in Cambridge.

The Antarctic Memorial Plinth was unveiled in July 2024 in the Memorial Orchard at the British Antarctic Survey Headquarters in Cambridge. This represents the completion of a long-term commemorative project by the Trust and includes inscriptions naming those who died in British Antarctic scientific service.

== Ambassadors ==
The trust has four well-known ambassadors – Felicity Aston, Paul Rose, John Killingbeck and Dr. Russell Thompson. Each promotes the trust’s work through lectures and acting as guides and interpreters on Antarctic tour ships.
