= Felicity Aston =

British adventurer/climate scientist

Felicity Aston MBE FRGS
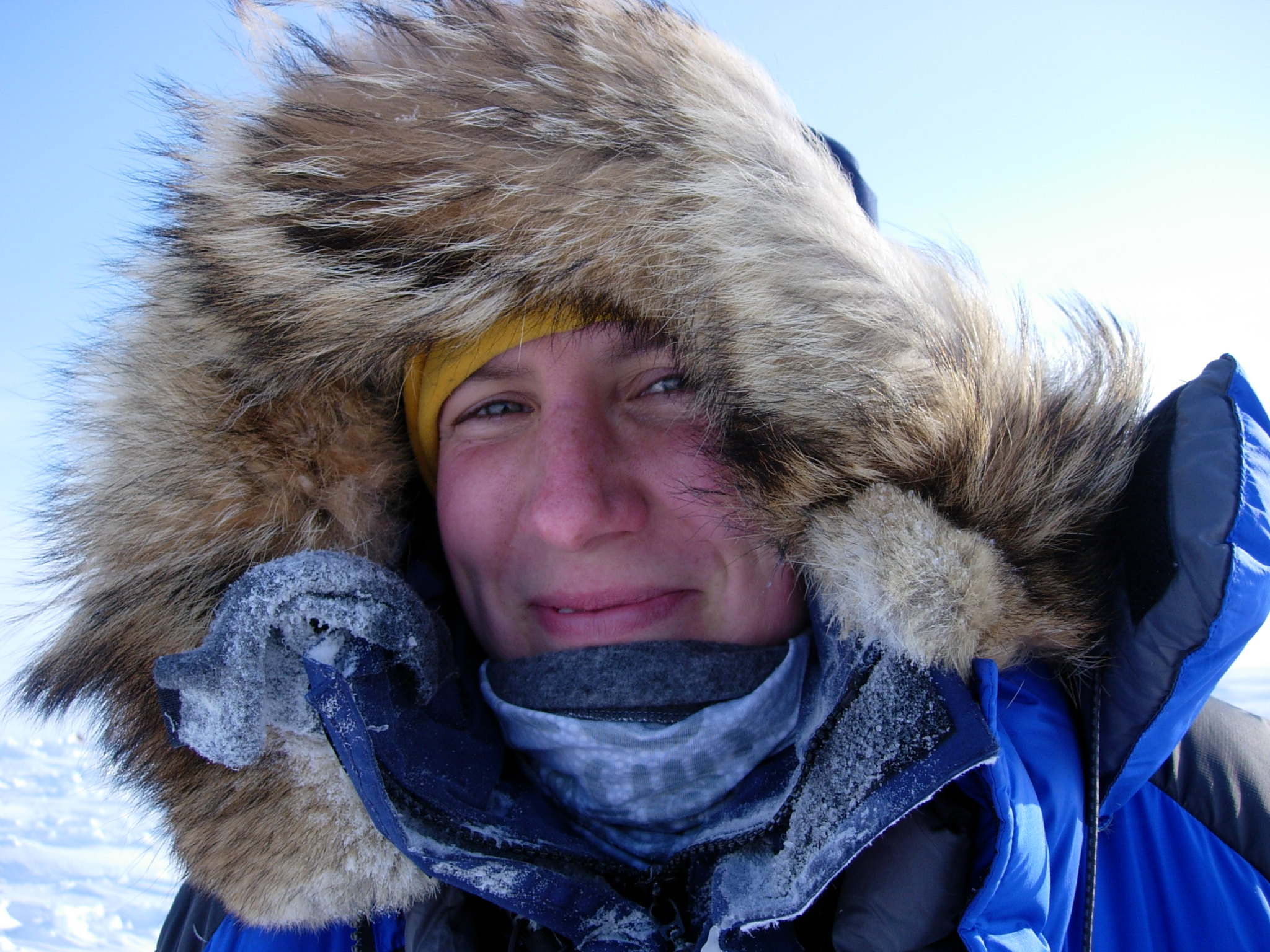
- Born: Kent, England
- Education: University College London (BSc) University of Reading (MSc)
- Awards: Member of the Order of the British Empire (2015); Polar medal (2015)
- Scientific career
- Fields: Climatology
- Website: felicityaston.co.uk

Felicity Ann Dawn Aston MBE FRGS is a British explorer, author and climate scientist. In 2012, she became the first person to ski alone across the Antarctic landmass using only her own muscle power and the first woman to complete a solo crossing.

Her work combines long-distance polar travel with environmental research. Since her Antarctic crossing, she has led international and all-female expeditions across Antarctica, Greenland and the High Arctic. She was appointed a Member of the Order of the British Empire and awarded the Polar Medal for services to polar exploration.

== Early life and career ==
Originally from Kent, Aston went to Tonbridge Grammar School for Girls and was educated at University College London (BSc) and Reading University (MSc in applied meteorology).

Between 2000 and 2003, Aston was the senior meteorologist at Rothera Research Station located on Adelaide Island off the Antarctic Peninsula operated by the British Antarctic Survey, monitoring climate and ozone.

As was usual at the time for British Antarctic Survey staff, she spent three summers and two winters continuously at the station without leaving the Antarctic.

== Exploration ==
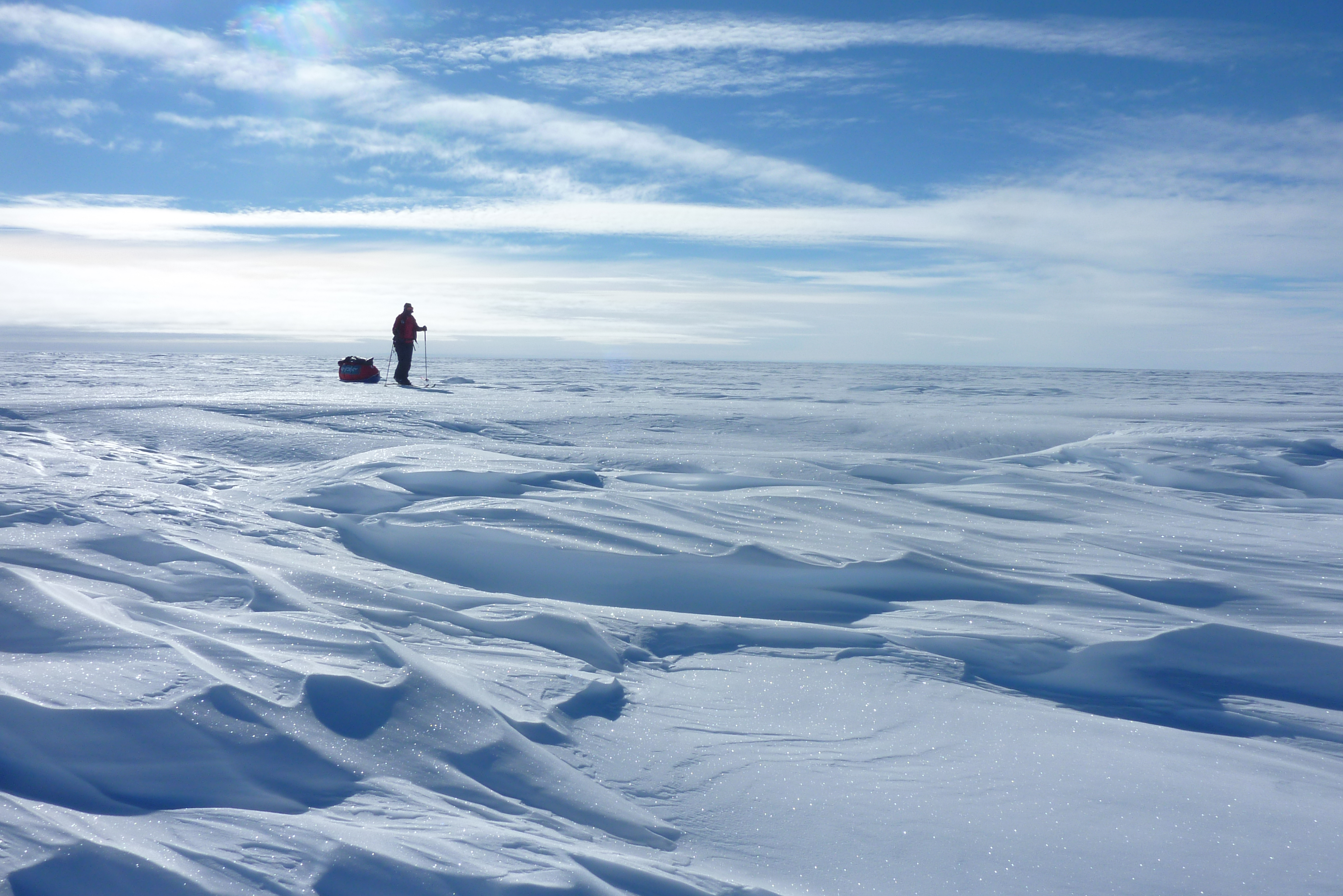
Aston in Antarctica

In 2005, Aston joined a race across Arctic Canada to the 1996 position of the North Magnetic Pole, known as the Polar Challenge. She was part of the first all-female team to complete this race; they came in 6th place out of 16 teams.

In 2006, Aston led the first all-female British expedition across the Greenland ice sheet.

In 2009, she organised and led the Kaspersky Commonwealth Antarctic Expedition, in which seven women from six Commonwealth member countries skied to the South Pole in 2009 to celebrate the 60th anniversary of the founding of the Commonwealth.

Call of the White: Taking the world to the South Pole is her account of this expedition. It was published by Summersdale in 2011 and was a finalist in the Banff Mountain Book Competition in that year.

In 2012, she became the first person to ski alone across the Antarctic land-mass using only personal muscle power, as well as the first woman to cross the Antarctic land-mass alone. Her journey began on 25 November 2011, at the Leverett Glacier, and continued for 59 days and a distance of 1,084 miles (1,744 kilometres). She had two supply drops. She said, "The fact that I had crossed Antarctica, despite the tears and the fear and the alone-ness, deepened my belief that we are each far more capable than we give ourselves credit for. Our bodies are stronger and our minds more resilient than we could ever imagine."

In 2018 she led an all-women EuroArabian expedition to the North Pole, the team included the mountaineer Asma Al Thani, who became the first Qatari person to ski there. The expedition contributed to the study of human psychology under extreme conditions.

Aston has also walked across the ice of Lake Baikal, the world's deepest and oldest lake, and completed the Marathon des Sables.

Between 2020 and 2024 Aston led the B.I.G (Before It's Gone) expedition, an all-female expedition project to research Arctic sea ice. The four-year project involved ski expeditions to Drangajökull, the northernmost glacier in Iceland, Svalbard and Nunavut in Canada. In each location her team completed a ski traverse and collected surface snow and ice samples, to be analyzed for the presence of microplastics, black carbon and heavy metals.

== Positions and awards ==
She is an official ambassador for both the British Antarctic Monument Trust and the Equaladventure charity, and was awarded an honorary doctorate by Canterbury Christ Church University for her exploration achievements. She is a Fellow of the Royal Geographical Society and The Explorers Club. In 2016 she co-presented a television history programme series about the 1898 Klondyke Gold Rush. Her photo-portrait by Anita Corbin was one of the 100 First Women Portraits at the Royal Albert Memorial Museum & Art Gallery, Exeter.

Aston was appointed Member of the Order of the British Empire (MBE), and awarded the Polar Medal in the 2015 New Year Honours for services to polar exploration.

== Personal life ==
She lives in Iceland and farms eiderdown from wild eider ducks on an island in the Arctic Westfjords, is married and has a son.
