= Asma Al Thani =

Qatari climber

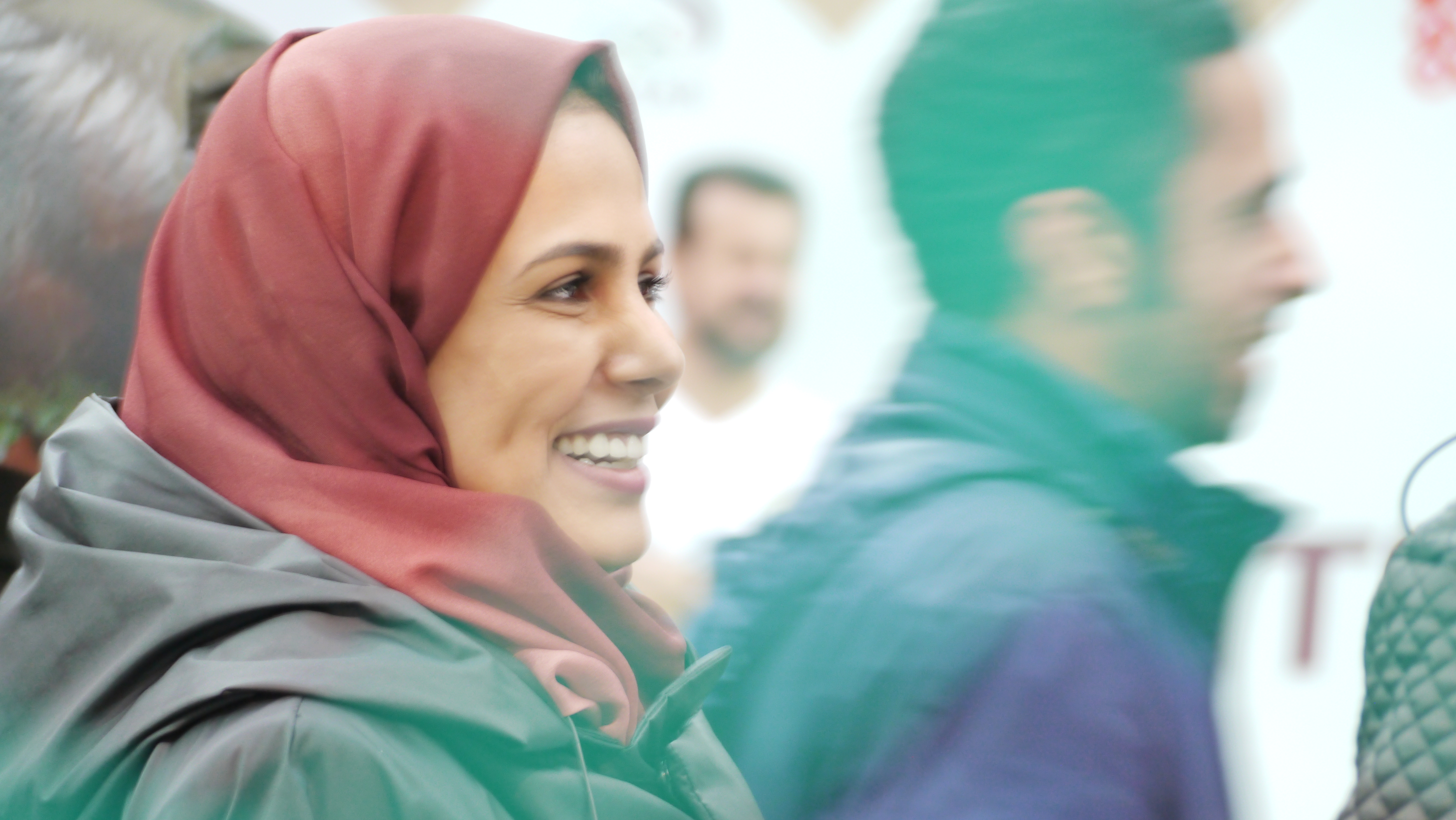

Personal information
- Nationality: Qatari

Climbing career
- Major ascents: Mount Everest, Lhotse, Mount Manaslu, Mount Dhaulagiri, Mount Ama Dablam, Kangchenjunga

Sheikha Asma Al Thani (Arabic: أسماء آل ثاني, romanized: ʾAsmāʾ al-Thānī) is a Qatari mountaineer who is the first Qatari woman to summit Mount Everest, Lhotse, and Manaslu, K2 as well as the first Qatari female to climb Ama Dablam. She is also the first Qatari person to ski to the North Pole. On her ascent of Manaslu, she became the first Arab person to summit an eight-thousander without oxygen. She climbed Lhotse for the second time in May 2024, without using supplemental oxygen, becoming the first Arab to climb two 8000er without supplemental oxygen. She is Director of Marketing and Communications for the Qatar Olympic Committee. She is also a member of the ruling family of Qatar.

== Mountaineering ==
In 2013, Al Thani found a bucket list she had written several years before, which included the resolution of climbing a mountain. She began training shortly afterwards and in 2014 she was part of a group of climbers who were the first Qatari women to summit Kilimanjaro. In 2018 she became the first Qatari person to ski to the North Pole and she raised her country's flag there on 21 April. She was part of an all-female Euro-Arabian Polar expedition, which was led by Felicity Aston who was the first woman to travel unaided across the Antarctic mainland. As a result she was recognised as "Woman of the Year" by Grazia magazine which is published in Qatar. In 2019, Al Thani became the first Qatari woman to summit Aconcagua.

On 8 November 2021 she became the Qatari first woman to reach the summit of Ama Dablam. Earlier that year, she also summited Mount Elbrus in Russia, and Dhaulagiri and the eighth highest mountain, Manaslu in Nepal. As a result of her climb on Manaslu she became the first Arab to reach the summit of one of the highest mountains (an eight-thousander) without the use of oxygen. She was also the first Qatari woman to summit Ama Dablam in Nepal. She climbed Mount Vinson in January 2022. on 9 May 2022 She became first Arabic to climb Kangchenjunga.

Al Thani reached the summit of Everest on 27 May 2022. She and her team carried a football created by Adidas for the FIFA World Cup Qatar to the summit of Everest. Named 'Al Rihla' which means 'the journey', the ball will be the World Cup’s first Arabic match's official ball. She reached the summit of Lhotse on 28 May 2022 and K2 in July 2022.

Al Thani climbed Denali, her sixth of the seven summits on 17 June 2022.

== Career ==
Al Thani is the Director of Marketing and Communications for the Qatar Olympic Committee (QOC).
