= Reena Kaushal Dharmshaktu =

Indian explorer

Reena Kaushal Dharmshaktu (Hindi: रीना कौशल धर्मशक्तू) is the first Indian woman to ski from the coast of Antarctica to the South Pole covering a distance of 900 kilometers.

== About ==
Dharmshaktu was born into a Hindu family from Punjab. She grew up in Darjeeling. She completed mountaineering courses at the Himalayan Mountaineering Institute in Darjeeling. Reena was an instructor with the US-headquartered National Outdoor Leadership Schools (NOLS) that teaches outdoor skills to people. Her husband, Love Raj Singh Dharmshaktu is also a mountaineer, who has reached the summit of Mount Everest seven times.

== Expeditions ==
Dharmashaktu has been on expeditions to Gangotri 1, did the first ascent of Argan Kangri. She also climbed Fluted Peak, Stok Kangri, Mt Nun and others.

On 29 December 2009, Dharmshaktu made the historic ski-run as part of an eight-woman Commonwealth team (the Kaspersky Commonwealth Antarctic Expedition) which crossed a 900 kilometer Antarctic ice trek to reach the South Pole, marking the 60th anniversary of the founding of the Commonwealth. She was selected from among 800 applicants from Brunei, Cyprus, Ghana, India, Jamaica, Singapore, New Zealand and the UK.

== Awards ==
Dharmshaktu was awarded the Tenzing Norgay National Adventure Award 2010 in land adventure category.
