= Chong Kumdang Ri =

Mountain peaks in Ladakh

Chong Kumdan Ri I & II
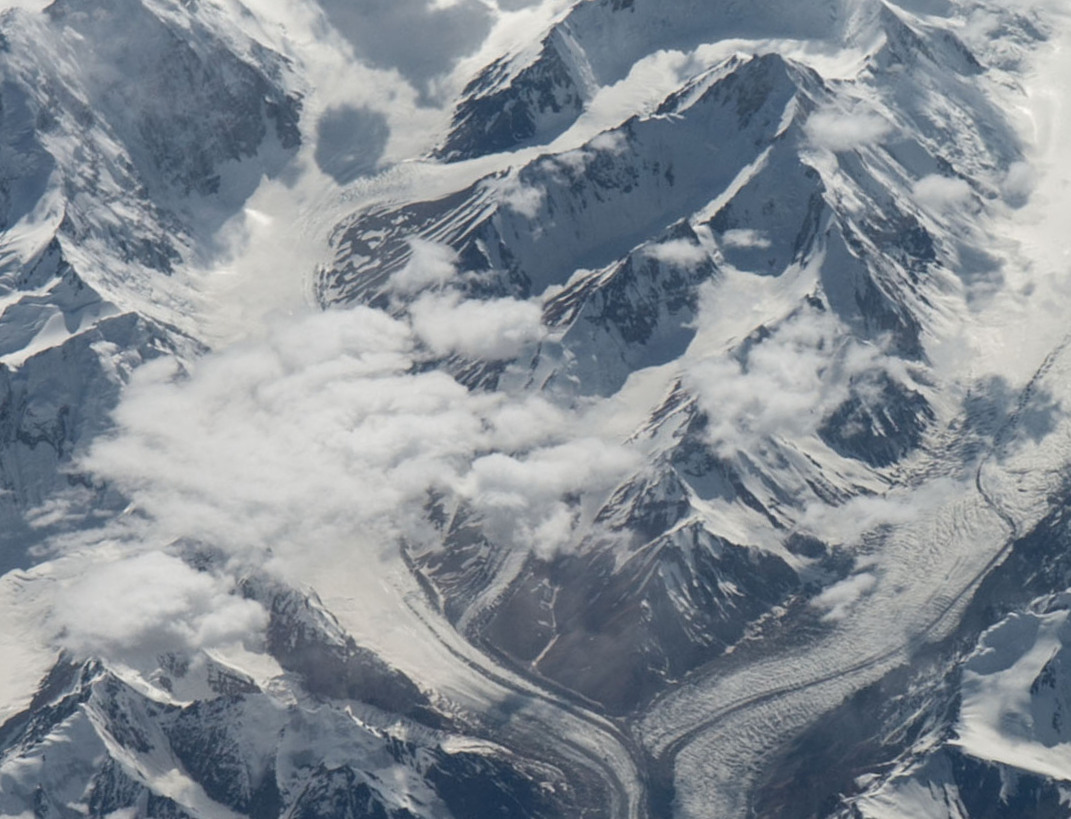
- Chong Kumdang Ri I

Highest point
- Elevation: 7,071 m (23,199 ft)
- Prominence: 871 m (2,858 ft)
- Coordinates: 35°11′37″N 77°35′07″E

Geography
- Location within India Location within Ladakh
- 1 Chong Kumdang Ri I (7,071 m /23,199 ft); 2 Chong Kumdang Ri II (7,004 m /22,979 ft) Location in Ladakh
- Location: Ladakh

Climbing
- First ascent: No Records

Chong Kumdang Ri (or Chong Kumdang Ri I & II) are two of the highest mountains in the mountain group which are located in the north of Mamostong Kangri in Rimo Karakoram sub-range in the west of the Transhimalaya.

== Location ==
Chong Kumdang Ri massif has two prominent peaks.

- Chong Kumdang Ri I is at 7,071 m (23,199 ft) above sea level. The prominence is at 871 m (2,858 ft).
- Chong Kumdang Ri II is at 7,004 m (22,979 ft) above sea level. The prominence is at 644 m (2,113 ft).
