= Gimmigela Chuli =

Mountain in Nepal and Sikkim

- The Twins
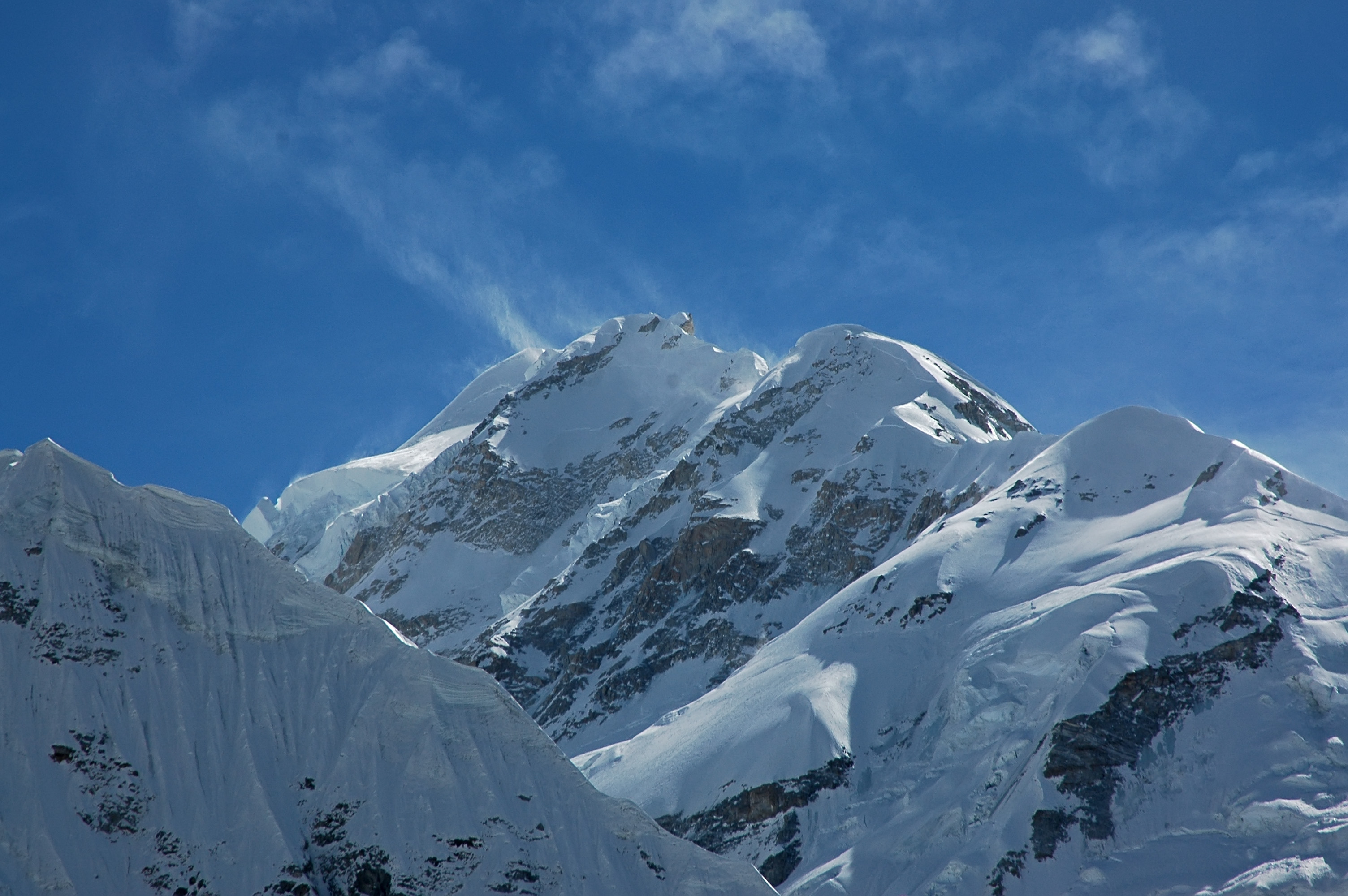

Highest point
- Elevation: 7,350 m (24,110 ft)
- Prominence: 432 m (1,417 ft)
- Parent peak: Kangchenjunga
- Listing: Mountains of Nepal; Mountains of India
- Coordinates: 27°44′N 88°09′E

Geography
- Location within Nepal Location within India
- Countries: India and Nepal
- Parent range: Kangchenjunga Himal, Himalayas

Climbing
- First ascent: 1994 by Taroh Tanigawa, Koji Nagakubo and Yuichi Yoshida
- Easiest route: glacier/snow/ice climb

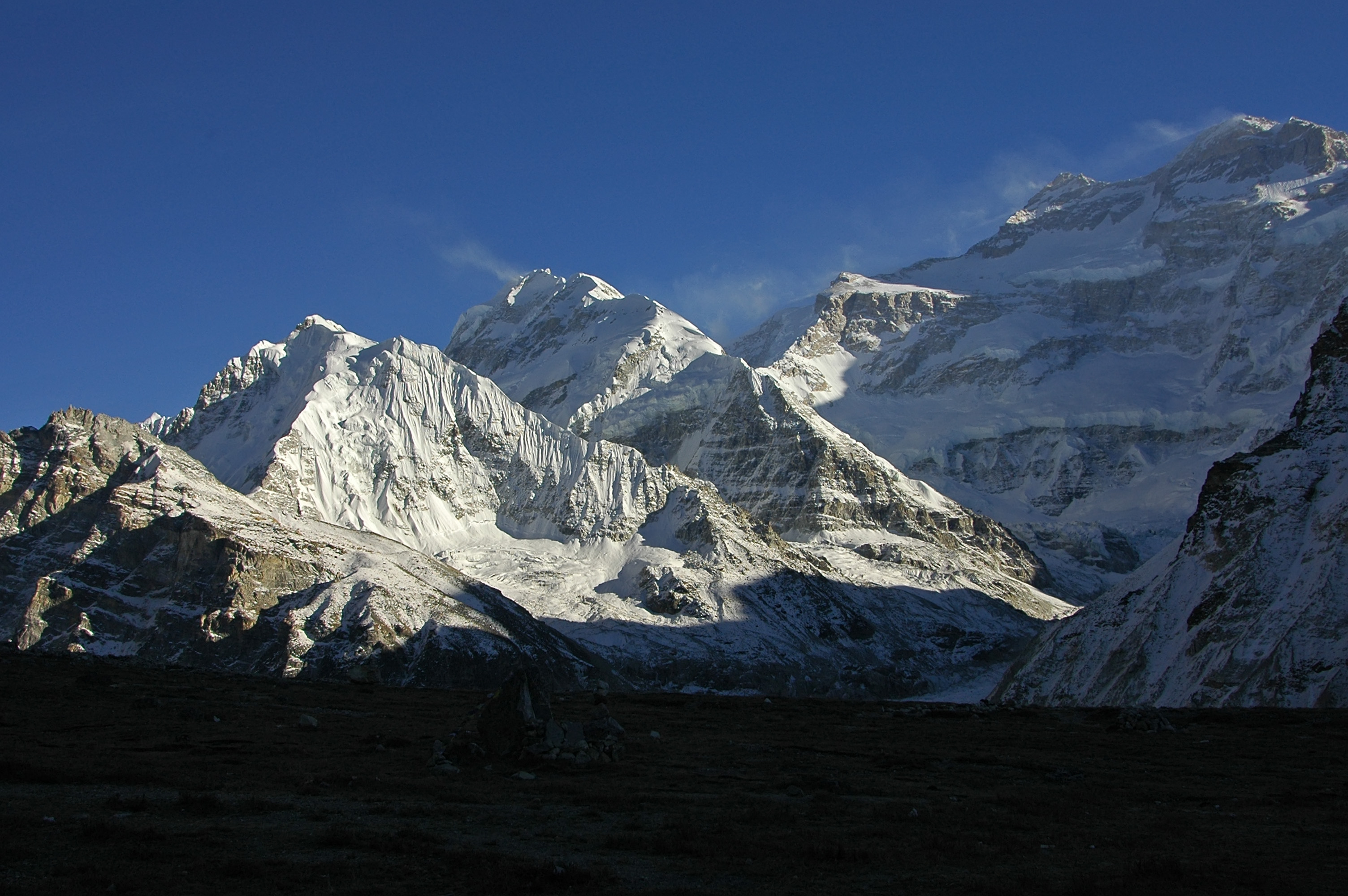
From left Taple Shikar (6510 m), The Twins and Kangchenjunga (8586 m).

Gimmigela Chuli, or The Twins, are two-peak mountains in the Himalayas, located on the border between Taplejung, Mechi, Nepal and Sikkim, India.

== Location ==
It has an elevation of 7,350 m (24,110 ft) above sea level and prominence is at 432 m (1,417 ft). It is situated approximately 4.2 km (2.6 mi) NNE from Kangchenjunga.

The mountain has a subpeak, Gimmigela Chuli II 7,005 m (22,982 ft) metres; prominence is at 185 m (607 ft). This subpeak, sometimes referred to as "Gimmigela's Sister", lies entirely within India. Together the two peaks, Gimmigela I and Gimmigela II, are known as "The Twins".

== Climbing history ==
A Japanese expedition attempted to reach the west (main) summit in 1993 via the east ridge from Sikkim, ending on 18 October 1993 after the death of expedition leader Masanori Sato. The team had achieved the first ascent of Gimmigela II and were on the summit ridge connecting the two peaks in an attempt to summit Gimmigela I when Sato fell 35 metres (115 ft) into a hidden crevasse. Despite the efforts of the other team members, his body was not recovered and the expedition was terminated.

One year later in October 1994, Taroh Tanigawa, Koji Nagakubo and Yuichi Yoshida, members of the failed attempt in 1993, achieved the first ascent of Gimmigela I.
