= Stephanie Solomonides =

Cypriot explorer

Stephanie Solomonides (Greek: Στεφανία Σολομωνίδου; b.1982, Nicosia) is an explorer, who is the first person from Cyprus to reach both the North and the South Poles. She became the first Cypriot to reach the South Pole on 29 December 2009 as part of the Kaspersky Commonwealth Antarctic Expedition. She, like the seven women who were with her, was chosen from among 800 candidates from the member states of the Commonwealth of Nations.

In 2018 when she reached the North Pole as part of the Women’s Euro Arabian North Pole Expedition, she became the first Cypriot to reach both poles.

Solomonides was educated at The English School (Nicosia) and the University of Durham. Prior to reaching the North Pole, she worked as a vice president at JP Morgan.
