= Dayangku Najibah Eradah =

Bruneian explorer (born 1983)

- دايڠكو نجيبه ايراده
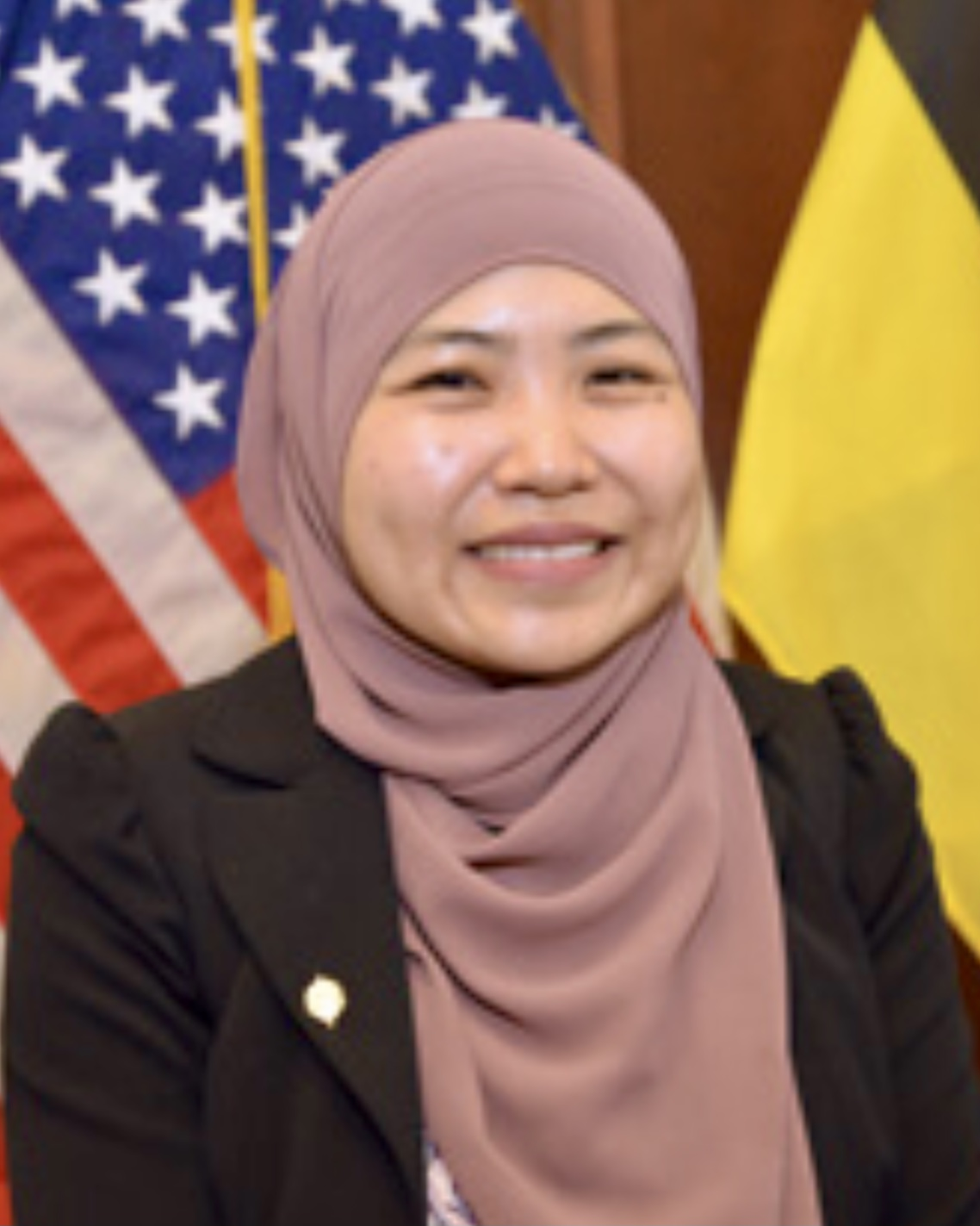
- Born: Dayangku Najibah Eradah binti Pengiran Ahmad Mahdi Al-Sufri; 10 May 1983 (age 42); Brunei
- Occupations: Teacher; environmentalist; explorer
- Known for: First Bruneian to reach the South Pole
- Spouse: Faierony Hazelin Mat Jair
- Parents: Pengiran Ahmad Mahdi Al-Sufri (father); Pengiran Basmillah (mother)
- Relatives: Pengiran Muda Abdul Kahar (grandfather); Pengiran Anak Idris (uncle); Pengiran Anak Kemaluddin (granduncle)

Dayangku Najibah Eradah binti Pengiran Ahmad Mahdi Al-Sufri (born 20 May 1983), also known as Brunei’s Polar Girl, is a teacher and environmentalist, who is the first Bruneian to have reached the South Pole.

== South Pole expedition ==
Era and seven other woman, each from a different Commonwealth country, were selected from among over 800 candidates to take part in the Kaspersky Commonwealth Antarctic Expedition, which reached the South Pole on 29 December 2009. Explaining her participation in the expedition, she said: "I am passionate about environmental issues and hope to use my involvement in the expedition to raise awareness in Brunei of global warming and climate change".

Bruneian media described her achievement as "a historic day for Brunei and a momentous day for the Sultanate's women". Saiful Ibrahim, Vice president of the Brunei Adventure Recreation Association, described her as "an icon for all Bruneians, especially for women and our youths". She has become known in Brunei as "the Polar Girl". Bruneian businesswoman Halina Taib stepped in to fund the trip, after there were financial difficulties.

== Personal life ==
Era's father, Pengiran Ahmad Mahdi Al-Sufri, is a distant member of the royal family, while her mother, Pengiran Hajah Basmillah binti Pengiran Haji Abbas, is a diplomat. Additionally, she has an uncle and granduncle who maintain a close relationship with the royal family; respectively they are Pengiran Anak Idris and Pengiran Anak Kemaluddin. Formerly a mathematics teacher in secondary school, Era became a government officer at the Bruneian Ministry of Foreign Affairs and Trade.

== Recognitions and awards ==
- Youth Outstanding Merit (2010)

== See also ==
- Antarctic ice sheet
