= Tsangyang Gyatso peak =

Geographic feature in Arunachal Pradesh

Tsangyang Gyatso
- Location within Arunachal Pradesh Location within India Location within Asia Location within Earth

Highest point
- Elevation: 6,383 m (20,942 ft)
- Coordinates: 27°35′N 91°51′E

Geography
- Location: Tawang district, Arunachal Pradesh, India

Tsangyang Gyatso is a mountain peak in the Tawang district of the Indian state of Arunachal Pradesh, named after the 6th Dalai Lama Tsangyang Gyatso and stands at an elevation of 20,942 ft (6,383 m).

== Location ==
The peak is located in Tawang district of the Indian state of Arunachal Pradesh. It is very close to the Line of Actual Control and is the West face of Gori Chen complex of hills and mountains. The peak is situated at an elevation of 20,942 ft (6,383 m).

== Climbing history ==
The peak was first climbed on 25 September, 2024 by a team from National Institute of Mountaineering and Adventure Sports (NIMAS). The group was led by Colonel Ranveer Singh Jamwal, and consisted of 15 members, including 8 mountaineers who had administrative support and 7 members. It took 15 days for the team to complete the climb and reach the peak safely.

In a press release, the Defence Ministry announced the name of the peak as Tsangyang Gyatso, which is also the name of the 6th Dalai Lama. Ministry said it was named to pay tribute to his "timeless wisdom and huge contributions" to the local Monpa community. The Dalai Lama was also born in the Tawang district where the mountain peak is situated. Ministry described the peak as one of the most technically difficult peaks to climb in the region, with ice walls, multiple crevasses, and a 2 kilometers long glacier.
