= Skyampoche Ri =

Mountain peak

- Location within India Location within Ladakh

Highest point
- Elevation: 7,016 m (23,018 ft)
- Prominence: 1,157 m (3,796 ft)
- Coordinates: 35°04′39″N 77°38′10″E

Geography
- Location: Ladakh

Climbing
- First ascent: No records

Skyampoche Ri (also known as Aq Tash) is a mountain peak located at 7,016 m (23,018 ft) above sea level in the eastern part of the Karakoram.

== Location ==
The peak is located in the North-east of Sasoma settlement in Ladakh. The prominence is 1,157 m (3,796 ft).
