= Argan Kangri =

Mountain in India

- Location within India

Highest point
- Elevation: 6,789 m (22,274 ft)
- Coordinates: 34°36′22.162″N 77°53′58.427″E

Geography
- Location: Ladakh, India
- Parent range: Saser Muztagh (Karakorum)

Climbing
- First ascent: 20 July 2003

Argan Kangri, 6,789 metres (22,274 ft), is the highest mountain of the Arganglas group in the southern part of the Saser Muztagh in Ladakh.

In 2001 a joint Indo-American-British expedition which included Chris Bonington and Harish Kapadia attempted the ascent of Argan Kangri. Members of the expedition successfully ascended some peaks in the area but their attempt on Argan Kangri was unsuccessful, largely due to avalanche-prone snow conditions.

A nine-member, all ladies expedition sponsored by the Indian Mountaineering Foundation made the first ascent on 20 July 2003. The expedition was led by IMF Vice-president Rita Gombu Marwa, the daughter of Nawang Gombu Sherpa. Four of the team, Reena Kaushal, Phul Maya Tamang, Sushma Thakur and Kavita Barthoki, reached the summit along with four sherpas.

In 1970 an Indian army expedition climbed a peak of this height, which was located on similar latitude and longitude and on the same glacier. They referred to that peak as Phunangma, after the name of the glacier at its foot. There are several peaks in the area which have very similar heights.
