= Pathibara =

Mountain peak in Himalayas

- Location within Koshi Province Location within Nepal Location within Tibet Location within China Location within Asia

Highest point
- Elevation: 7123
- Coordinates: 27°49′15″N 88°10′22″E

Geography
- Country: Nepal
- Parent range: Himalayas

Climbing
- First ascent: Indo-Japanese Team, 1993

Pathibara (also known as Pathibara Chuli, Pyramid Peak, and Sphinx) is a mountain peak located on the border of Nepal and North Sikkim, India.

== Location ==
The peak is located at 7,123 m (23,369 ft) above sea level on western rim of the Lhonak valley, roughly 4 kilometers north of Kirat Chuli and 12 kilometers north of Kangchenjunga. And 4 km towards north, Langpo is situated at 6,965 m (22,851 ft). Along the northern flank of Pathibara, the Western Langpo Glacier flows towards the west.

== Climbing history ==
On 24–26 April 1993, an Indo-Japanese expedition made the first ascent of Pathibara. The team consisted of Hiroshi Iwazaki, Nobuhiro Shingo, Yoshio Ogata, Jot Singh Bhundari, Sunder Singh Martolia, Lopsang Sherpa and Purba Lepcha.

Slovenians Boris Lorencic and Miha Valic were the first to climb Pathibara from the Nepalese side in October 2007.
