= Saser Muztagh =

Mountain range in India

- Chinese: 莎瑟慕士塔格山
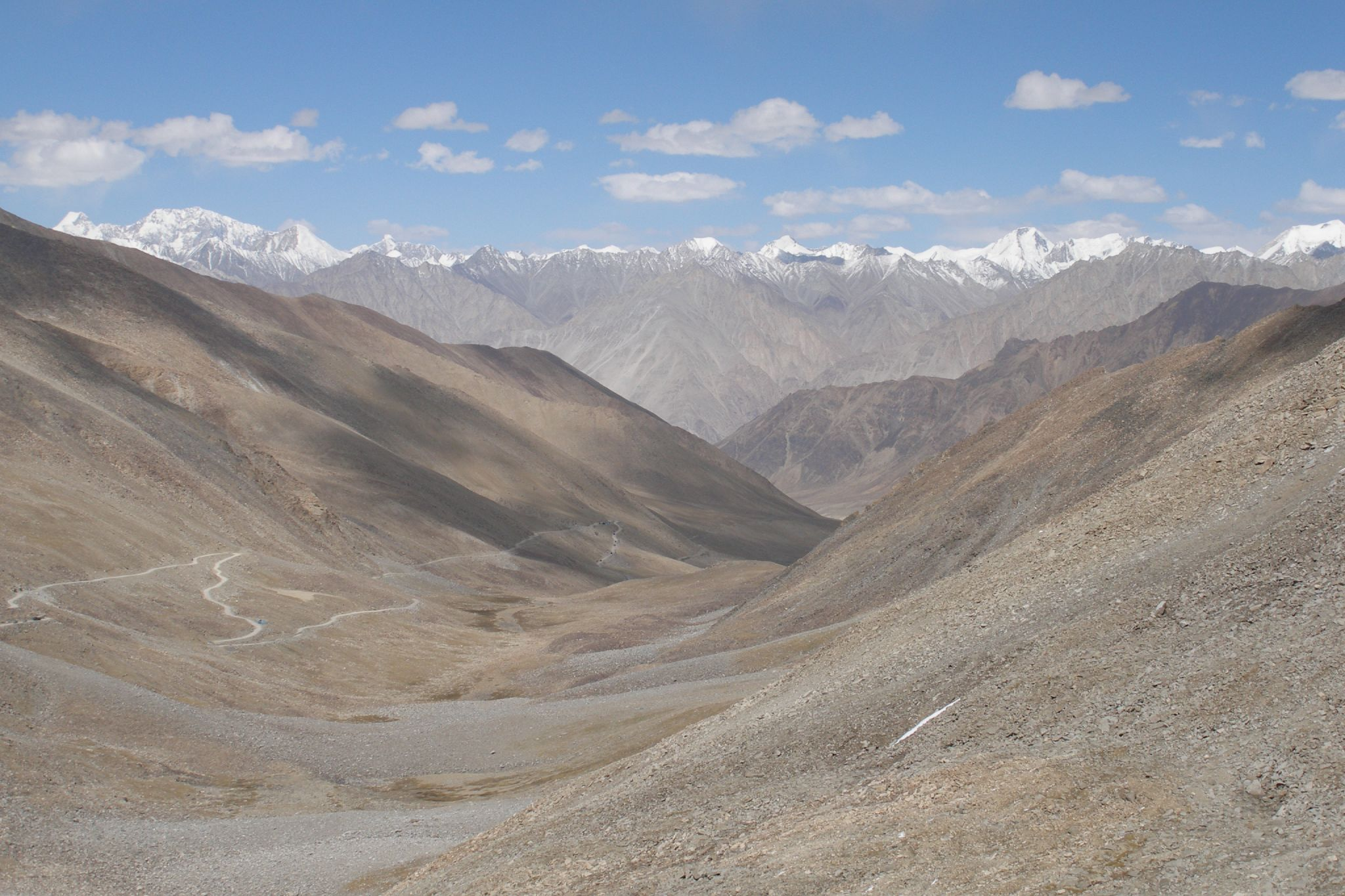
- Saser Muztagh seen from Khardung La

Highest point
- Peak: Saser Kangri
- Elevation: 7,672 m (25,171 ft); Ranked 35th
- Prominence: 2,304 m (7,559 ft)
- Listing: Mountains of India
- Coordinates: 34°51′54″N 77°45′09″E

Geography
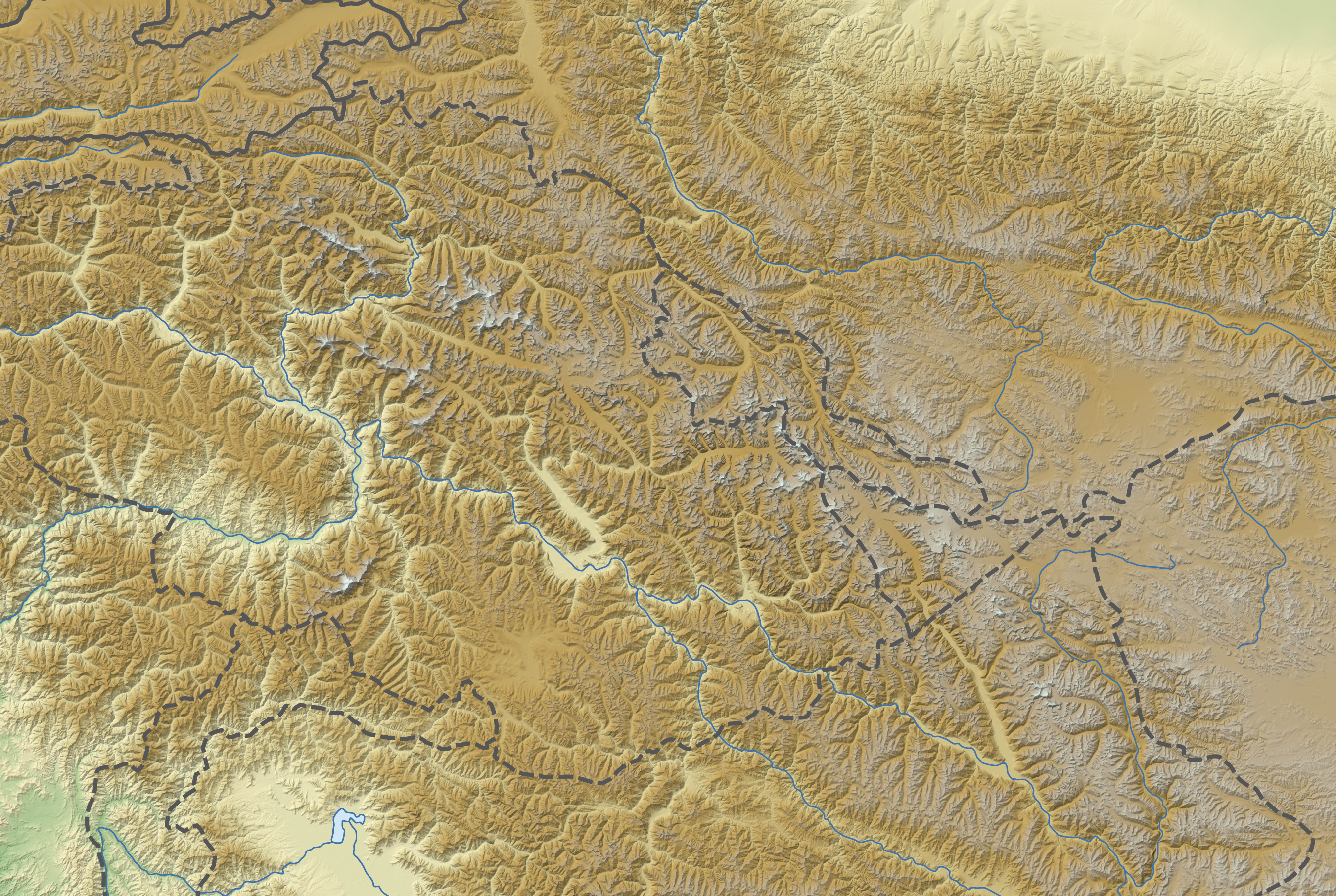
- Location within Karakoram Location within Ladakh Location within India
- Country: India
- State: Ladakh
- District: Leh
- Settlement: Leh
- Range coordinates: 34°40′N 77°50′E
- Parent range: Karakoram
- Borders on: Ladakh Range

The Saser Muztagh is the easternmost subrange of the Karakoram range, in the Ladakh region of India. It is bounded on the south, east and northeast by the Shyok River, which bends sharply around the southeast corner of the range. On the west it is separated from the neighboring Kailas Mountains by the Nubra River, while the Sasser Pass (Saser La) marks the boundary between this range and the Rimo Muztagh to the north. The Ladakh Range stands to the south of the Saser Muztagh, across the Shyok River.

Early European exploration and surveying of this range occurred between 1850 and 1900. In 1909 famed explorer T. G. Longstaff, Arthur Neve, and A. M. Slingsby explored the Nubra Valley and scouted approaches to the main Saser Kangri massif. However the main peaks were not climbed until the 1970s.

Since this region is near the disputed border between China and India, there is currently little climbing and exploratory activity in the range, except for occasional forays by the Indian military.

== Glaciers ==
Notable glaciers of the Saser Muztagh include the North and South Shukpa Kunchang Glaciers, the Sakang Glacier, and the Chamshen Glacier.

== Selected peaks ==
The following is a table of the peaks in the Saser Muztagh which are over 7,200 m (23,600 ft) in elevation and have over 500 m (1,600 ft) of topographic prominence. (This is a common criterion for peaks of this stature to be independent.) Note that they are all in the Saser Kangri group. The highest peak in the range outside of this group is Argan Kangri, 6,789 metres (22,274 ft), in the Arganglas group in the southern part of the range.

Mountain	Height (m)	Height (ft)	Coordinates	Prominence (m)	Parent mountain	First ascent	Ascents (failed attempts)
Saser Kangri I	7,672	25,171	34°52′00″N 77°45′09″E	2,304	Gasherbrum I	1973	6 (4)
Saser Kangri II E	7,513	24,649	34°48′15″N 77°48′18″E	1,450	Saser Kangri I	2011	1 (0)
Saser Kangri III	7,495	24,590	34°50′44″N 77°47′06″E	850	Saser Kangri I	1986	1 (0)

== See also ==
- List of highest mountains
