= Rimo Muztagh =

Mountain range

- Chinese: 里莫慕士塔格山
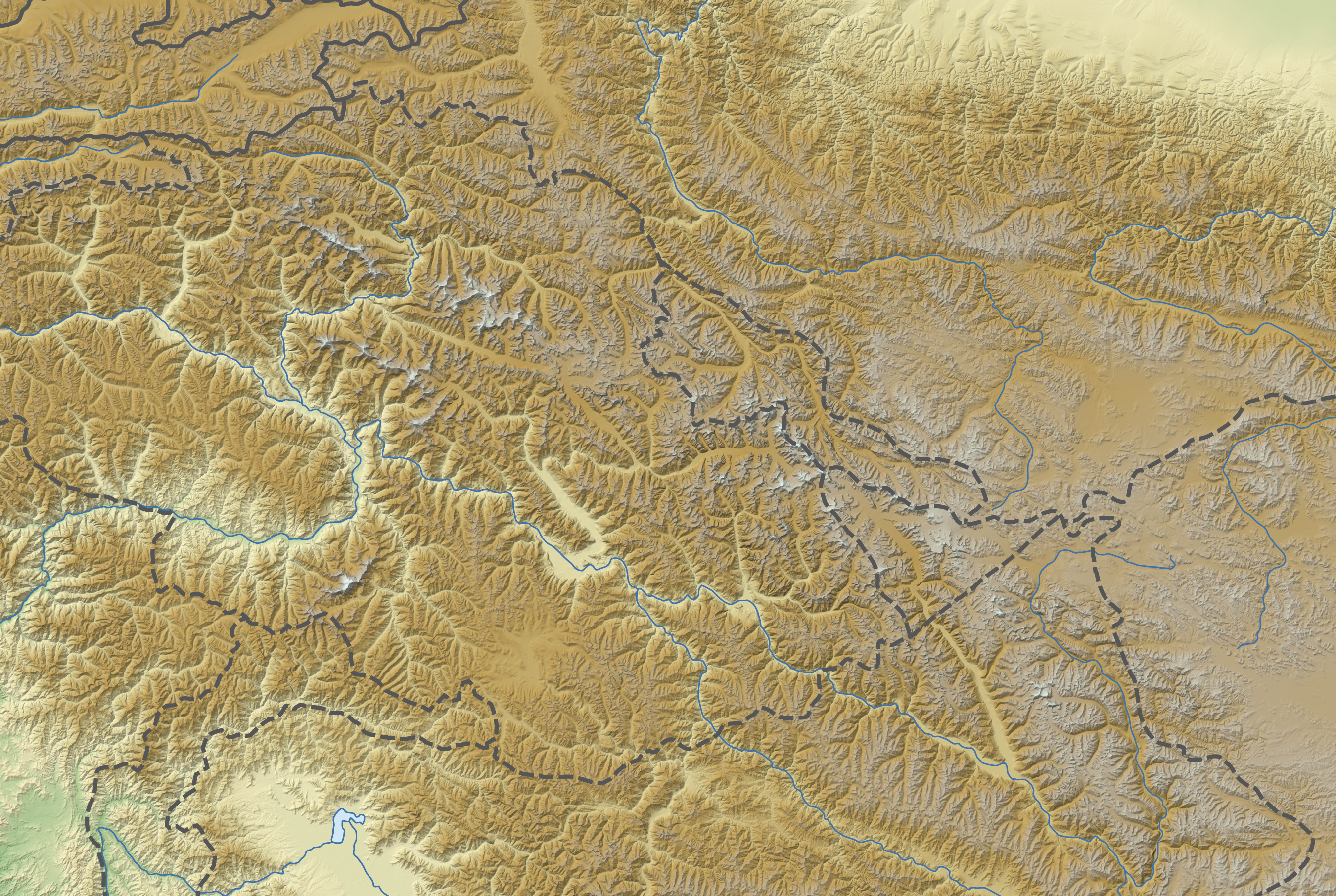
- Location within Karakoram Location within Ladakh Location within India

Highest point
- Peak: Mamostong Kangri
- Elevation: 7,516 m (24,659 ft)
- Coordinates: 35°08′27″N 77°34′39″E

Geography
- Parent range: Karakoram

The Rimo Muztagh is one of the most remote subranges of the Karakoram range. The southern part of Rimo Muztagh is in the Ladakh portion of far northwestern India, also claimed by Pakistan. The northern half, including the Rimo massif, is in the Siachen area (territory controlled by India). It is far from major towns, and close to the militarily sensitive Siachen Glacier, so it has seen little exploration or climbing activity compared to, for example, the nearby Baltoro Muztagh. The highest peak is Mamostong Kangri, 7,516 metres (24,659 feet).

The Rimo Muztagh is bordered on the north by the Rimo Glacier, which drains to the east into the upper Shyok River, and by the Teram Shehr Glacier, a tributary of the Siachen Glacier. To the northeast lie the Northeast Rimo Mountains and the Karakoram Pass, a pass on one of the historically important trade routes into Central Asia. To the north lies the eastern end of the Siachen Muztagh. On the east side of the range, the upper Shyok River divides it from the Depsang Plains, part of the Tibetan Plateau. On the southeast, the pass known as the Sasser Pass (Saser La) separates the Rimo Muztagh from the Saser Muztagh. The western border of the range is formed by the lower Siachen Glacier and its outflow, the Nubra River. Across this boundary lie the Saltoro Mountains and the Kailas Mountains.

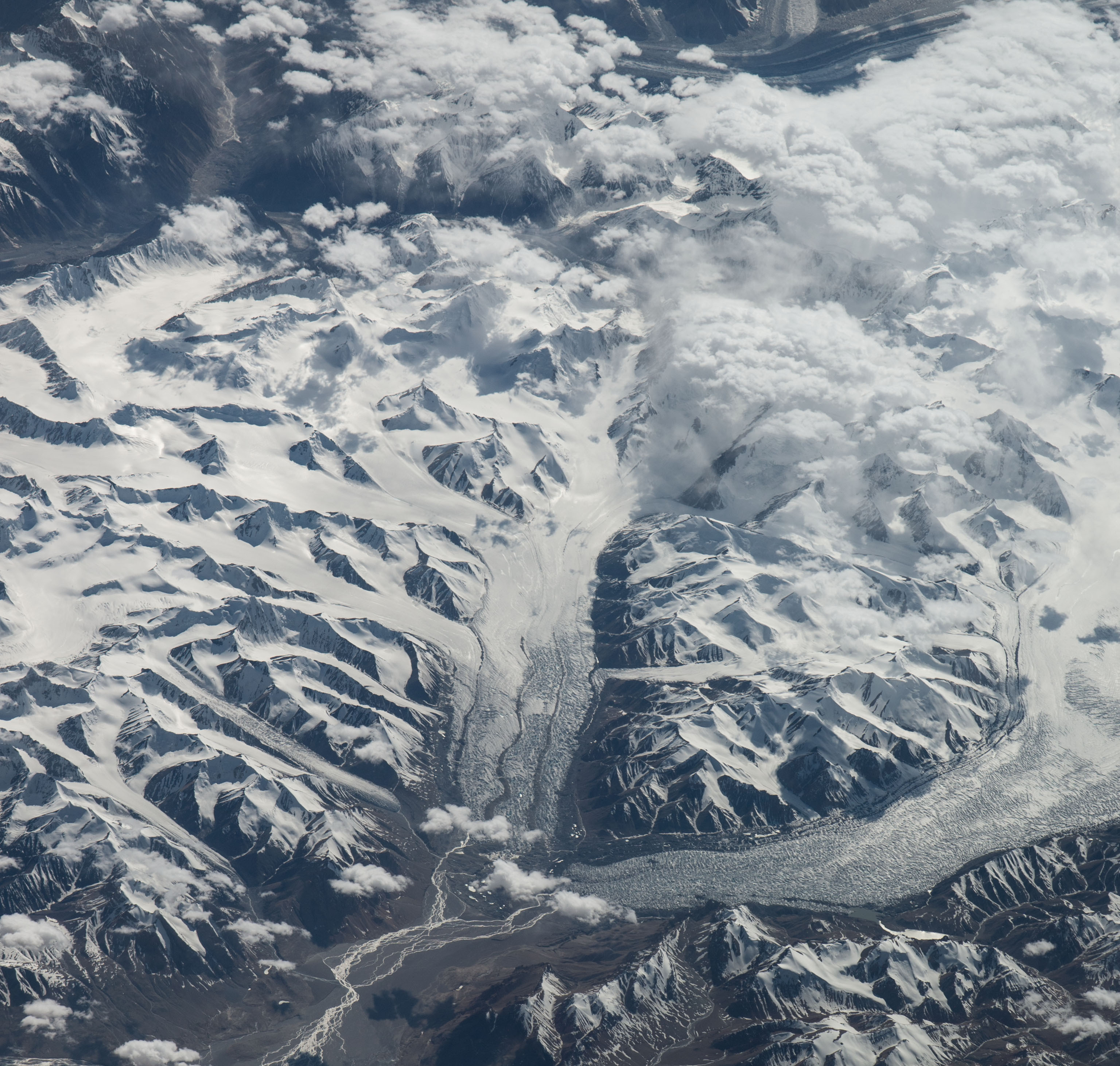
South Rimo Glacier, Rimo Muztagh, Shyok River

== Selected peaks of the Rimo Muztagh ==
The following is a table of the peaks in the Rimo Muztagh which are over 7,200 metres (23,600 ft) in elevation and have over 500 m (1,600 ft) of topographic prominence. (This is a common criterion for peaks of this stature to be independent.)

Mountain	Height (m)	Height (ft)	Coordinates	Prominence (m)	Parent mountain	First ascent	Ascents (attempts)
Mamostong Kangri	7,516	24,659	35°08′27″N 77°34′39″E	1,803	Gasherbrum I	1984	5 (0)
Rimo I	7,385	24,229	35°21′21″N 77°22′05″E	1,438	Teram Kangri I	1988	1 (3)
Rimo III	7,233	23,730	35°22′29″N 77°21′42″E	615	Rimo I	1985	1 (0)

=== Other peaks ===
Other notable peaks include the following:

- Chong Kumdang Ri I, 7,071 m
- Padmanabh / Terong Tower, 7,030 m
- Skyampoche Ri I / Aq Tash I, 7,016 m
- Chong Kumdang Ri II, 7,004 m

== See also ==
- Geography of Ladakh
- List of mountain peaks of Ladakh
- List of mountains in India
- List of mountain passes of India
- List of Indian states and territories by highest point
- List of highest mountains

== Sources ==
- Jerzy Wala, Orographical Sketch Map of the Karakoram, Swiss Foundation for Alpine Research, Zurich, 1990.
- Andy Fanshawe and Stephen Venables, Himalaya Alpine-Style, Hodder and Stoughton, 1995.
