= Chiling I and II =

Mountain in India

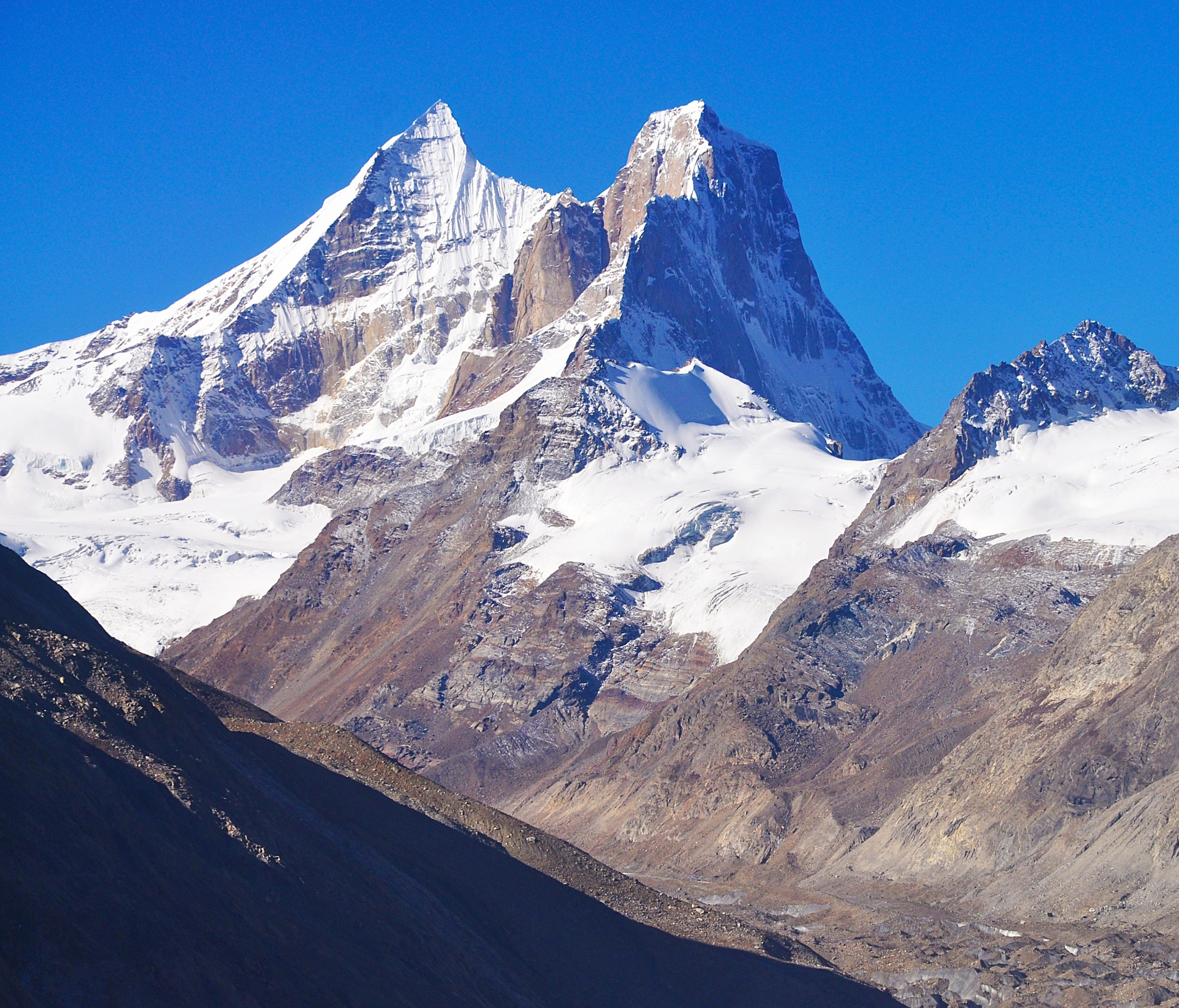
- Northeast aspect

Highest point
- Elevation: 6,349 m (20,830 ft)
- Prominence: 851 m (2,792 ft)
- Parent peak: Doda
- Isolation: 9.17 km (5.70 mi)
- Coordinates: 33°48′42″N 76°09′41″E

Geography
- Location within India
- Interactive map of Chiling I and II
- Location: Kashmir
- Country: India
- Union territory: Jammu and Kashmir / Ladakh
- District: Kargil
- Parent range: Himalayas; Western Himalayas

Geology
- Rock type: Granite

Climbing
- First ascent: 1977

Chiling I and II is a mountain on the border of Jammu and Kashmir and Ladakh in northern India.

== Description ==
Chiling is a 6,349-metre (20,830-foot) glaciated double summit in the Himalayas. The lower peak, Chiling II, rises to an elevation of 6,253 metres and is 790 metres north of Chiling I. The remote mountain is situated 53 kilometres (33 mi) south of the city of Kargil, and north of Kishtwar National Park. Precipitation runoff from this mountain's slopes drains into the Chenab River drainage basin and the Suru River drainage basin. Topographic relief is significant as the summit rises 1,300 metres (4,265 ft) above the Chiling Glacier in one kilometre (0.62 mi). The first ascent of Chiling I was probably achieved in 1977 by Gino and Silvia Buscaini via the south ridge. The east ridge of Chiling I was first climbed in 2017 by Jon Griffin and Tad McCrea via a route they named Wantonly Tarnished, and a few days earlier Oriol Baró and Lluc Pellissa made the first ascent of the east ridge of Chiling II.

== Climate ==
Based on the Köppen climate classification, Chiling is located in a tundra climate zone with cold, snowy winters, and cool summers. Weather systems are forced upwards by the Himalaya mountains (orographic lift), causing heavy precipitation in the form of rainfall and snowfall. Mid-June through early-August is the monsoon season. The months of March, April, and May offer the most favorable weather for visiting Kashmir.

== See also ==
- Geology of the Himalayas
