= Mamostong Kangri =

Mountain in India

- Location within Ladakh Location within India
- The major peaks in Karakoram are rank identified by height. Legend: 1：K2; 2：Gasherbrum I, K5; 3：Broad Peak; 4：Gasherbrum II, K4; 5：Gasherbrum III, K3a; 6：Gasherbrum IV, K3; 7：Distaghil Sar; 8：Kunyang Chhish; 9：Masherbrum, K1; 10：Batura Sar, Batura I; 11：Rakaposhi; 12：Batura II; 13：Kanjut Sar; 14：Saltoro Kangri, K10; 15：Batura III; 16： Saser Kangri I, K22; 17：Chogolisa; 18：Shispare; 19：Trivor Sar; 20：Skyang Kangri; 21：Mamostong Kangri, K35; 22：Saser Kangri II; 23：Saser Kangri III; 24：Pumari Chhish; 25：Passu Sar; 26：Yukshin Gardan Sar; 27：Teram Kangri I; 28：Malubiting; 29：K12; 30：Sia Kangri; 31：Momhil Sar; 32：Skil Brum; 33：Haramosh Peak; 34：Ghent Kangri; 35：Ultar Sar; 36：Rimo Massif; 37：Sherpi Kangri; 38：Yazghil Dome South; 39：Baltoro Kangri; 40：Crown Peak; 41：Baintha Brakk; 42：Yutmaru Sar; 43：K6; 44：Muztagh Tower; 45：Diran; 46：Apsarasas Kangri I; 47：Rimo III; 48：Gasherbrum V; Location in Ladakh

Highest point
- Elevation: 7,516 m (24,659 ft); Ranked 47th
- Prominence: 1,803 m (5,915 ft)
- Listing: Mountains of India; Ultra
- Coordinates: 35°08′27″N 77°34′39″E

Geography
- Location: Ladakh, India
- Parent range: Rimo Muztagh, Karakoram

Climbing
- First ascent: September 13, 1984 by an Indo-Japanese expedition

Mamostong Kangri
- Traditional Chinese: 瑪莫斯通崗日峰
Transcriptions

Mamostong Kangri or Mamostang Kangri, surveyed as K35, is the highest peak in the remote Rimo Muztagh, a subrange of the Karakoram range in Ladakh union territory of India. It is located about 30 km (19 mi) east-southeast of the snout of the Siachen Glacier. It is the 47th-highest independent peak in the world (using a 500m prominence cutoff).

The South Chong Kumdan, Kichik Kumdan (Thangman Kangri), Mamostong, and South Terong Glaciers all head on the slopes of Mamostong Kangri.

Mamostong Kangri has not seen a great deal of visitation due to its remote location and the unsettled political and military situation in the region. The first European exploration of the peak was in 1907 by Arthur Neve and D. G. Oliver. The first ascent was made in 1984 by an Indo-Japanese expedition, via the Northeast Ridge, after a complicated approach. The summit party comprised N. Yamada, K. Yoshida, R. Sharma, P. Das, and H. Chauhan, N. Purohit

The Himalayan Index lists four additional ascents of this peak; however, two of these listings may refer to the same climb.

== Summary of ascents ==
Year	Expedition	Leader	Route
1984	Indo -Japanese	Col. B.S Sandhu	Mamostong Glacier /M.Col/East Ridge
1988	Indian Army (Ladakh Scouts)	Anand Mohan Sethi	Thangman Glacier/ East Ridge
1989	Indian Army	M.P Yadav	Mamostong Glacier /M.Col/East Ridge
1990	Border Security Force (BSF)	S.C Negi	Mamostong Glacier /M.Col/East Ridge
1992	Women's Pre Everest	Bachendri Pal	Mamostong Glacier /M.Col/East Ridge
1992	Indo- Austrian Expedition	N. Ravi Kumar	Mamostong Glacier /M.Col/East Ridge
2007	Indian Army	Col. Ashok Abbey	Thangman Glacier/ East Ridge
2007	Indo- French	Chewang Motup Goba	Mamostong Glacier /M.Col/East Ridge
2009	Indian Army ( EME)	Maj. V.Ahlawat	Mamostong Glacier /M.Col/East Ridge
2010	The Himalayan Club	P.C. Sahoo	Mamostong Glacier /M.Col/East Ridge

View from space of Mamostong Kangri
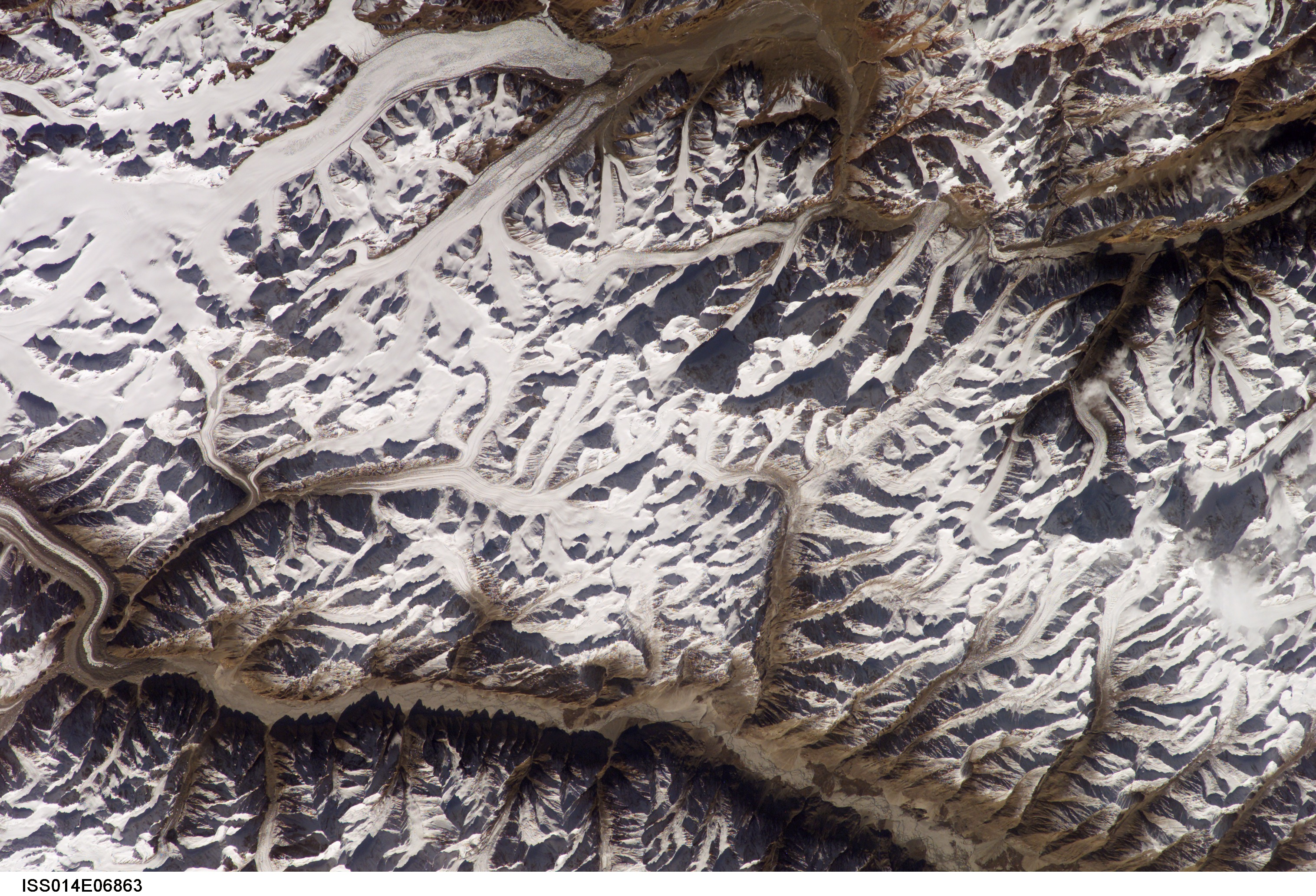

== See also ==
- List of highest mountains
- List of ultras of the Karakoram and Hindu Kush

== Sources ==
- Jerzy Wala, Orographical Sketch Map of the Karakoram, Swiss Foundation for Alpine Research, Zurich, 1990.
- Neate, Jill (1989). High Asia: An Illustrated History of the 7000 Metre Peaks. Seattle: The Mountaineers. ISBN 0-89886-238-8.
