= Siachen Muztagh =

Subrange of the Karakoram Range

- Chinese: 锡亚琴慕士塔格山
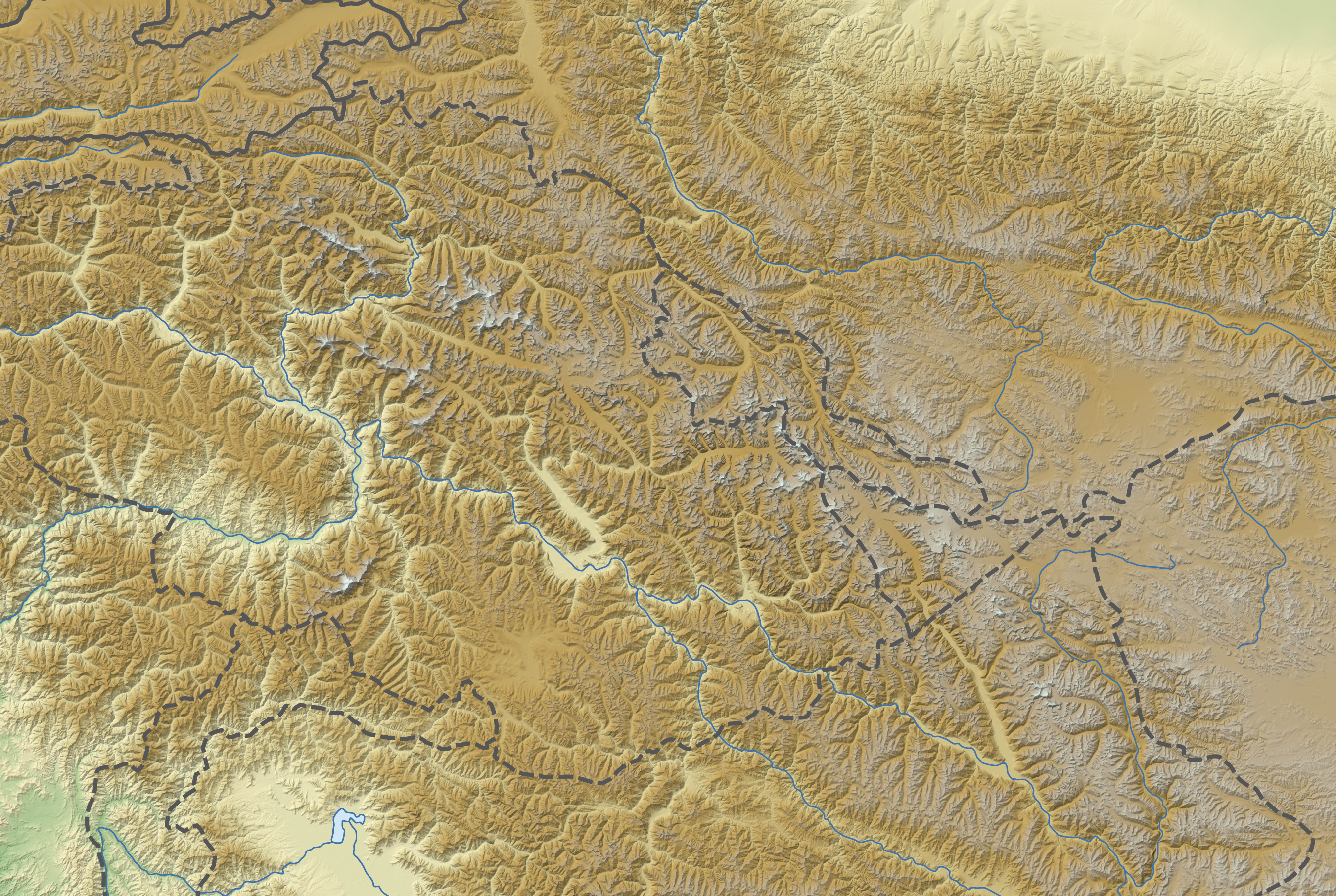
- Location within Karakoram Location within Ladakh Location within India Location within Southern Xinjiang Location within China

Highest point
- Elevation: 7,462 m (24,482 ft)
- Coordinates: 35°35′N 77°11′E

Geography
- Location: A region controlled by China and claimed by India and a region controlled by India and claimed by Pakistan (Note: India is in de facto control of this region of Ladakh; the Indian claim is disputed by Pakistan. See e.g. The Future of Kashmir on the BBC website.)
- Parent range: Eastern Karakoram Range

The Siachen Muztagh is a remote subrange of the eastern Karakoram Range. Close to 60% is in area controlled by China, 40% in area controlled by India. Pakistan claims the Indian-controlled portion as part of the Siachen Conflict. India claims the Chinese-controlled portion. India administers its portion as part of the Union Territory of Ladakh. China administers its portion as part of Xinjiang province.

All available maps and atlases (including a detailed delineation of the Siachen Muztagh's limits on the 1990 Swiss Foundation for Alpine Research "Karakoram Sheet 2" map) define the range as between the Shaksgam River on the north, the Urdok Glacier on the northwest (Urdok in Uyghur meaning duck), the Siachen Glacier on the southwest, the Teram Shehr Glacier and Rimo Glacier, and Indira Col on the south, and the uppermost Yarkand River on the east.

Its highest peak is Teram Kangri I, 7,462 metres (24,482 feet).

== Selected peaks of the Siachen Muztagh ==
The following is a table of the peaks in the Siachen Muztagh which are over 7,200 metres (23,600 ft) in elevation and have over 500 m (1,600 ft) of topographic prominence. (This is a common criterion for peaks of this stature to be independent.)

Mountain / Peak	Elevation		Prominence		Parent	FA	Coordinates
Mountain / Peak	m	ft	m	ft	Parent	FA	Coordinates
Teram Kangri I	7,462	24,482	1,704	5,591	Gasherbrum I	1975	35°34′48″N 77°4′42″E
Apsarasas Kangri I	7,245	23,770	625	2,051	Teram Kangri I	1976	35°32′20″N 77°8′57″E
