= Indian Olympic Association =

National Olympic committee

- Country: India
- Code: IND
- Created: 1927; 99 years ago
- Recognized: 1927
- Continental Association: OCA
- Headquarters: New Delhi, India
- President: P. T. Usha
- Website: olympic.ind.in

The Indian Olympic Association, abbreviated as IOA, (ISO: Bhāratīya Olaṃpika Saṃgha) is responsible for selecting athletes to represent India at the Olympic Games, Asian Games and other international sports competitions, and managing Indian teams at these events. It goes with the name of Team India. It also acts as the Indian Commonwealth Games Association, responsible for selecting athletes to represent India at the Commonwealth Games.

== History ==
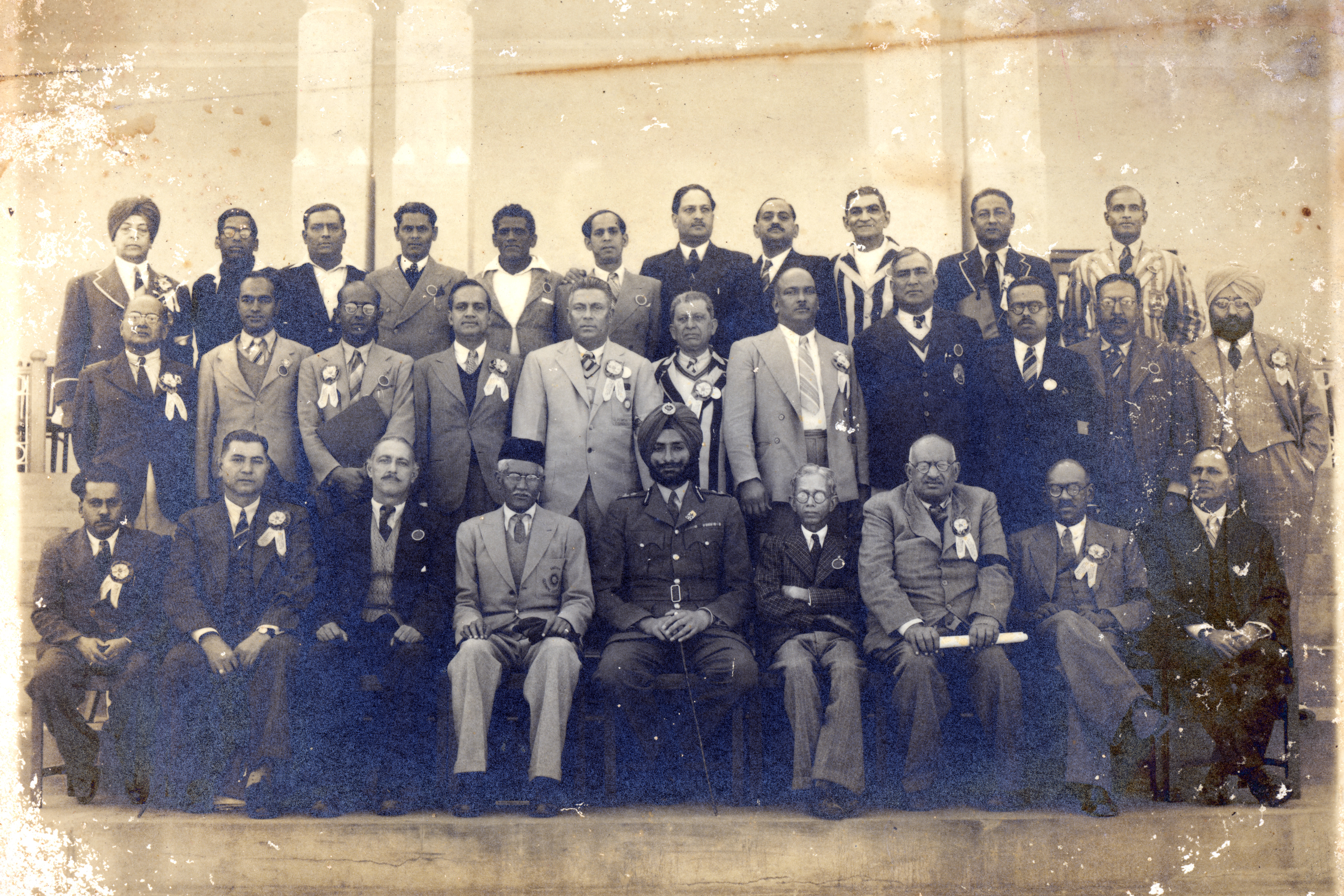
Indian Olympic Association, 1942

The background behind the creation of the Indian Olympic Association was related to India's participation in the 1920 and 1924 Olympics. After the 1920 Games, the committee sending the team to these games met, and, on the advice of Sir Dorab Tata, invited Dr. Noehren (Physical Education Director of YMCA India) to be secretary, along with AS Bhagwat, of the provisional Indian Olympic Committee; Dorab Tata would serve as its president. Subsequently, in 1923–24, a provisional All India Olympic Committee was formed, and the All India Olympic Games (that later became the National Games of India) were held in Feb 1924. Eight athletes from these games were selected to represent India at the 1924 Paris Olympics, accompanied by manager Harry Crowe Buck. This gave impetus to the development and institutionalization of sports in India, and, in 1927, the Indian Olympic Association (IOA), was created at the initiative of Harry Crowe Buck and Dr. A. G. Noehren (both of the Madras (YMCA) College of Physical Education). Sir Dorab Tata was important in financing and supporting the movement and became the first Indian Olympic Association president in 1927. Messrs Buck and Noehren travelled across India and helped many states organise their Olympic associations. Noehren was the first Secretary and Guru Dutt Sondhi was the first assistant secretary of the Indian Olympic Association, and after Noehren resigned in 1938, Sondhi and S.M. Moinul Haq became the secretary and joint secretary of the Indian Olympic Association.

The Indian Olympic Association was formed in 1927, and since that year was officially recognised by the International Olympic Committee as India's national Olympic organisation. In 1928, Maharaja Bhupindra Singh took over as Indian Olympic Association president.

Early tasks:

- Sending teams to the Olympics: In its first decade, the Indian Olympic Association selected sportspersons to represent India at the Olympic Games in 1928, 1932, and 1936. Subsequently, by 1946–47, the Indian Olympic Association took responsibility only to send the Indian team to the Olympics (principally, this meant arranging transport, board, and accommodation), while the separate federations for each sport were responsible for selecting and training competitors for their sport. Reflecting this, ahead of the 1948 Olympics, the IOA Council agreed that a team representing athletics, swimming, weight lifting, wrestling, boxing, football, and hockey, with officials for each of these sports, and a Chief Manager, would be entered for the 1948 Olympics. And so, from 1948 onward, India began sending teams representing several sports – each selected by its respective sports federation – to the Olympics.
- Securing funding: One of the Indian Olympic Association's main early challenges was to secure funding, so that it could send the national team to the Olympics and finance the related costs of transport, room, and board. It obtained funding from the Indian government, from the state governments, and from various state sports federations.

Illustrating this, IOA President Yadavindra Singh's appeal for funding in 1948 stated: "We need about 3 lakh of rupees to finance" the Indian Olympic team for the London Olympics; that "the youth taking part in these games become ambassadors of goodwill" for India; and that "careful selection, intensive training and proper equipment is most essential" to field a competitive team, but that the Indian Olympic Association is "greatly handicapped for want of sufficient funds" for these tasks.

The Indian Olympic Association thus undertook wider outreach with several national sports federations, and essentially became a clearing house that coordinated the sending of multiple sports teams – each selected by their respective sports federations – to the Olympics.

- The National Games: The Indian Olympic Association had one other major responsibility, that of holding the biennial National Games (Indian Olympics). It recognised, in the 1920s-1940s, that the promotion of sports in India needed a National Games, because there was no overall national sports federation of India.

== Administration ==
=== IOA executive council ===
Following is the IOA executive committee for the 2022–2026 term.

Designation	Name	National sports federation / State olympic committee
President	P. T. Usha	Athletes Commission of the IOA
Senior Vice-President	Ajay Patel	National Rifle Association of India
Vice-Presidents	Rajlaxmi Singh Deo	Rowing Federation of India
Vice-Presidents	Gagan Narang	Athletes Commission of the IOA
Treasurer	Sahdev Yadav	Indian Weightlifting Federation
CEO	Raghuram Aiyar	NA
Joint Secretaries	Kalyan Chaubey	All India Football Federation
Joint Secretaries	Alaknanda Ashok	Badminton Association of India
Executive Council Members	Amitabh Sharma	Ice Skating Association of India
Executive Council Members	Bhupender Singh Bajwa	Wushu Association of India
Executive Council Members	Lt. Gen. Harpal Singh	Indian Golf Union
Executive Council Members	Rohit Rajpal	Athletes Commission of the IOA
Executive Council Members	Dola Banerjee	Athletes Commission of the IOA
Executive Council Members	Yogeshwar Dutt	Athletes Commission of the IOA
Athletes' Commission Members	Mary Kom	NA
Athletes' Commission Members	Sharath Kamal	NA

== State Olympic Associations ==
1. Andaman and Nicobar Olympic Association
2. Andhra Pradesh Olympic Association
3. Arunachal Pradesh Olympic Association
4. Assam Olympic Association
5. Bengal Olympic Association
6. Bihar Olympic Association
7. Chandigarh Olympic Association
8. Chhattisgarh Olympic Association
9. Delhi Olympic Association
10. Dadra and Nagar Haveli and Daman and Diu Olympic Association
11. Goa Olympic Association
12. Gujarat State Olympic Association
13. Haryana Olympic Association
14. Himachal Pradesh Olympic Association
15. Jammu and Kashmir Olympic Association
16. Jharkhand Olympic Association
17. Karnataka Olympic Association
18. Kerala Olympic Association
19. Madhya Pradesh Olympic Association
20. Maharashtra Olympic Association
21. Manipur Olympic Association
22. Meghalaya State Olympic Association
23. Mizoram Olympic Association
24. Nagaland Olympic Association
25. Odisha Olympic Association
26. Pondicherry Olympic Association
27. Punjab Olympic Association
28. Rajasthan Olympic Association
29. Sikkim Olympic Association
30. Tamil Nadu Olympic Association
31. Olympic Association of Telangana
32. Tripura State Olympic Association
33. Uttarakhand Olympic Association
34. Uttar Pradesh Olympic Association

== National sports federations ==
National sports federations are categorized in two categories i.e. Olympic Sports and Other Recognized Sports

The IOC's membership currently includes 38 National Sports Federations.

=== Summer Olympic sports ===
Sport	National Federation
Aquatics	Swimming Federation of India
Archery	Archery Association of India
Athletics	Athletics Federation of India
Badminton	Badminton Association of India
Baseball	Amateur Baseball Federation of India
Basketball	Basketball Federation of India
Boxing	Boxing Federation of India
Canoeing	Indian Kayaking and Canoeing Association
Cricket	Board of Control for Cricket in India
Cycling	Cycling Federation of India
Equestrian	Equestrian Federation of India
Fencing	Fencing Association of India
Football	All India Football Federation
Golf	Indian Golf Union
Gymnastics	Gymnastics Federation of India
Handball	Handball Federation of India
Hockey	Hockey India
Judo	Judo Federation of India
Modern Pentathlon	Modern Pentathlon Federation of India
Rowing	Rowing Federation of India
Rugby	Indian Rugby Football Union
Skateboarding	Roller Skating Federation of India
Sailing	Yachting Association of India
Shooting	National Rifle Association of India
Softball	Softball Association of India
Squash	Squash Rackets Federation of India
Surfing	Surfing Federation of India
Table Tennis	Table Tennis Federation of India
Taekwondo	Taekwondo Federation of India
Tennis	All India Tennis Association
Triathlon	Indian Triathlon Federation
Volleyball	Volleyball Federation of India
Weightlifting	Indian Weightlifting Federation
Karate	Karate Association of India
Wrestling	Wrestling Federation of India

=== Winter Olympic sports ===
These all sports are under the Winter Games Federation of India.

Sport	National Federation
Ice Hockey	Ice Hockey Association of India
Ice Skating	Ice Skating Association of India
Luge	Luge Federation of India
Skiing	Ski and Snowboard India

=== IOC recognized sports ===
Sport	National Federation
Air sports	Aero Club of India
Bandy	Bandy Federation of India
Bocce	Bocce Association of India
Pétanque	Pétanque Federation of India
Bowling	Bowling Federation of India
Bridge	Bridge Federation of India
Billard	Billiards and Snooker Federation of India
Chess	All India Chess Federation
Dancesport	All India DanceSport Federation
Floorball	Indian Floorball Federation
Karate	Karate India Organisation
Korfball	India Korfball Committee
Lifesaving	Rashtriya Life Saving Society
Motorsport	Federation of Motor Sports Clubs of India
Mountaineering and Sport climbing	Indian Mountaineering Foundation
Netball	Netball Federation of India
Orienteering	Orienteering Federation of India
Pelota Vasca	Indian Pelota Vasca Federation
Polo	Indian Polo Association
Powerboating	Yachting Association of India
Racquetball	Racquetball Association of India
Roller sports	Roller Skating Federation of India
Sumo	Indian Sumo Wrestling Association
Tug of war	Tug of War Federation of India
Underwater sports	Underwater Sports Association India
Wakeboarding and Water skiing	Wakeboard & Water Ski Federation of India
Wushu	Wushu Association of India

=== Others ===
Following are some sports which IOC does not recognise as a Sport.

Sport	National Federation
Arm Wrestling	Indian Arm Wrestling Federation
Atya Patya	Atya Patya Federation of India
Ball badminton	Ball Badminton Federation of India
Ball hockey	Indian Ball Hockey Federation
Bodybuilding	Indian Body Builders Federation
Carrom	All-India Carrom Federation
Darts	All Indian Darts Association
Esports	Esports Federation of India
Fishing	All India Game Fishing Association
Fistball	Fistball Federation of India
Floor Tennis	Floor Tennis Federation of India
Futsal	All India Football Federation
Ju-jitsu	Ju-jitsu Association of India
Kabaddi	Amateur Kabaddi Federation of India
Kho Kho	Kho Kho Federation of India
Mixed martial arts	MMA India
Mallakhamb	Mallakhamb Federation of India
Pencak Silat	Indian Pencak Silat Federation
Powerlifting	Indian Powerlifting Federation
Professional boxing	Indian Professional Boxing Association
Skipping rope	Indian Rope Skipping Federation
Petanque	Petanque India Association
Rollball	Roll Ball Federation of India
Sepak Takraw	Sepaktakraw Federation of India
Rollball	Roll Ball Federation of India
Soft tennis	Amateur Soft Tennis Federation of India
Tennikoit	Tenni Koit Federation of India
Yachting	Yachting Association of India

== Multi-sport events hosted by IOA ==
- 1951 Asian Games
- 1982 Asian Games
- 1987 South Asian Games
- 1995 South Asian Games
- 2003 Afro-Asian Games
- 2007 Military World Games
- 2008 Commonwealth Youth Games
- 2010 Commonwealth Games
- 2011 South Asian Winter Games
- 2014 Lusophony Games
- 2016 South Asian Games
- 2030 Commonwealth Games

== Media image ==
The IOA debuted a new logo and new campaign tag #EkIndiaTeamIndia in 2020, this was celebrated on India's independence day 15 August 2020. The previous logo was created in 1924 at the inception of the IOA, the logo emphasized the Star of India. Through symbols of the Tiraṅgā the new logo celebrates the pride, dignity and lifetime of determined hard work given by India's finest athletes. The logo was created by Smitten an international design firm founded in Chennai by Smita Rajgopal.

== Recognition of athletes and coaches ==
From 2016, Olympic medallists and their coaches have been given advance consideration for the National Sports Awards if they have not already received one.

As of 2021, the Indian Olympic Association recognises Olympic medallists with the following cash prizes: ₹7.5 million (US$78,000) for gold medallists, ₹4 million (US$42,000) for silver and ₹2.5 million (US$26,000) for bronze. Coaches of Olympic medallists receive ₹1.25 million (US$13,000), ₹1 million (US$10,000) and ₹0.75 million (US$7,800), respectively.

=== National level ===
Olympic medallists are rewarded by the Government of India with the following cash prizes as of 2021: ₹7.5 million (US$78,000) for gold medallists, ₹5 million (US$52,000) for silver and ₹3 million (US$31,000) for bronze.

=== State and union territory level ===
At the state/territorial level, Olympians receive cash awards of various amounts, depending on their home region.

Monetary awards for Olympians and coaches by state/territory (as of 2021)

State/Union Territory	Gold medal	Silver medal	Bronze medal	Olympic qualifier	Coach of gold medallist	Coach of silver medallist	Coach of bronze medallist	Refs
Andhra Pradesh	₹7.5 million (US$78,000)	₹5 million (US$52,000)	₹3 million (US$31,000)	₹0.5 million (US$5,200)	₹0.3 million (US$3,100)	₹0.1 million (US$1,000)	-	
Assam	₹10 million (US$100,000)	₹7.5 million (US$78,000)	₹5 million (US$52,000)	₹0.5 million (US$5,200)	₹1 million (US$10,000)	₹0.5 million (US$5,200)	₹0.3 million (US$3,100)	
Chandigarh	₹60 million (US$620,000)	₹40 million (US$420,000)	₹25 million (US$260,000)	-	-	-	-	
Chhattisgarh	₹60 million (US$620,000)	₹40 million (US$420,000)	₹25 million (US$260,000)	-	-	-	-	
Delhi	₹30 million (US$310,000)	₹20 million (US$210,000)	₹10 million (US$100,000)	-	-	-	-	
Goa	₹10 million (US$100,000)	-	-	-	-	-	-	
Gujarat	₹50 million (US$520,000)	-	-	₹1 million (US$10,000)	-	-	-	
Haryana	₹60 million (US$620,000)	₹40 million (US$420,000)	₹25 million (US$260,000)	₹0.5 million (US$5,200)	-	-	-	
Himachal Pradesh	₹20 million (US$210,000)	-	-	-	-	-	-	
Jammu and Kashmir	₹5 million (US$52,000)	-	-	-	-	-	-	
Jharkhand	₹20 million (US$210,000)	-	-	-	-	-	-	
Karnataka	₹50 million (US$520,000)	-	-	-	-	-	-	
Kerala	₹10 million (US$100,000)	-	-	-	-	-	-	
Maharashtra	₹10 million (US$100,000)	₹7.5 million (US$78,000)	₹5 million (US$52,000)	-	-	-	-	
Manipur	₹12 million (US$120,000)	₹10 million (US$100,000)	₹7.5 million (US$78,000)	-	-	-	-	
Meghalaya	₹7.5 million (US$78,000)	-	-	-	-	-	-	
Odisha	₹60 million (US$620,000)	₹40 million (US$420,000)	₹25 million (US$260,000)	-	-	-	-	
Punjab	₹30 million (US$310,000)	₹20 million (US$210,000)	₹10 million (US$100,000)	₹0.5 million (US$5,200)	-	-	-	
Rajasthan	₹30 million (US$310,000)	-	-	-	-	-	-	
Sikkim	₹30 million (US$310,000)	-	-	-	-	-	-	
Tamil Nadu	₹30 million (US$310,000)	₹20 million (US$210,000)	₹10 million (US$100,000)	₹0.5 million (US$5,200)	-	-	-	
Telangana	₹20 million (US$210,000)	-	-	-	-	-	-	
Uttarakhand	₹15 million (US$160,000)	-	-	-	-	-	-	
Uttar Pradesh	₹60 million (US$620,000)	₹40 million (US$420,000)	₹20 million (US$210,000)	-	-	-	-	
West Bengal	₹2.5 million (US$26,000)	₹1.5 million (US$16,000)	₹1 million (US$10,000)	-	-	-	-	

== Past office bearers ==
=== Presidents ===
The following is a list of presidents of IOA:

S.No.	Name	Tenure
1	Sir Dorabji Tata	1927–1928
2	Maharaja Bhupinder Singh	1928–1938
3	Maharaja Yadavindra Singh	1938–1960
4	Bhalindra Singh	1960–1975
5	Om Prakash Mehra	1975–1980
6	Bhalindra Singh	1980–1984
7	Vidya Charan Shukla	1984–1987
8	Sivanthi Adithan	1987–1996
9	Suresh Kalmadi	1996–2011
–	Vijay Kumar Malhotra (acting )	26 April 2011 – 5 December 2012
10	Abhay Singh Chautala	5 December 2012 – 9 February 2014
11	Narayana Ramachandran	9 February 2014 – 14 December 2017
12	Narinder Dhruv Batra	14 December 2017 – 25 May 2022
–	Anil Khanna (acting)	25 May 2022 – 21 August 2022
–	Adille Sumariwalla (acting)	27 August 2022 – 10 December 2022
13	P. T. Usha	10 December 2022 – Incumbent

=== Secretaries ===
The following is a list of Secretaries of IOA:

S. No.	Name	Tenure
1.	A. G. Noehren	1927–1938
2.	Guru Dutt Sondhi	1938–1952
3.	Moin-ul-Haq	1952–1956
4.	Ashwini Kumar	1956–1960
5.	Pankaj Gupta	1960–1970
6.	Ashwini Kumar	1970–1974
7.	J. C. Paliwal	1974–1975
8.	Air Vice Marshal C. L. Mehta	1976–1986
9.	Roshan Lal Anand	1986–1987
10.	Randhir Singh	1987–2012
11.	Lalit Bhanot	2012–2014
12.	Rajeev Mehta	2014–2022
13.	Kalyan Chaubey & Alaknanda Ashok	2022-Incumbent

== Disputes ==
On 26 April 2011, after the arrest of its president Suresh Kalmadi, Vijay Kumar Malhotra was the acting president of the IOA up to 5 December 2012. The election of Lalit Bhanot as Secretary General was considered controversial by some due to his alleged involvement in the Commonwealth Games Scam.

On 4 December 2012, the International Olympic Committee suspended the IOA on the basis of corruption, government interference, and not following guidelines of the IOC. Several members of the IOA have been charged with crimes. The IOA was formally banned for not following the Olympic Charter in their elections, instead following the Indian government's Sports Code. The IOA held elections under the Indian Sports Code due to a directive from the Delhi High Court. On 15 May 2013, International Olympic Committee (IOC) decided to lift the ban on the Indian Olympic Association (IOA) as Indian representatives from the government and sports bodies reached an agreement with IOC officials. India still did not have its three competitors play under the national flag at the Winter 2014 Olympics. On 9 February, an election was held to choose a head of the IOA. Abhay Singh Chautala and Lalit Bhanot were ineligible due to having court charges against them. With the support of Abhay Singh Chautala, the president of the World Squash Federation, Narayana Ramachandran, was instead elected.

On 11 February 2014, the International Olympic Committee revoked the ban enforced on Indian Olympic Association. As a result, India returned to the Olympic fold after 14-months.

== See also ==
- India at the Olympics
- India at the Commonwealth Games
- India at the Asian Games
- Paralympic Committee of India
- Sport in India
