= Ashwini Kumar (sports administrator) =

Indian sports administrator and police officer (1920-2015)

- Kumar in 2005

Vice-President of the International Olympic Committee
- In office 1983–1987

Member of the International Olympic Committee
- In office 1973–2000

4th and 6th Secretary General of the Indian Olympic Association
- In office 1956–1960
- President: Yadavindra Singh
- Preceded by: Moin-ul-Haq
- Succeeded by: Pankaj Gupta
- In office 1970–1974
- President: Bhalindra Singh
- Preceded by: Pankaj Gupta
- Succeeded by: J. C. Paliwal

President of the Indian Hockey Federation
- In office 1958–1974
- Preceded by: Naval Tata
- Succeeded by: M. A. M. Ramaswamy

2nd Director General of the Border Security Force
- In office 1972–1977
- Preceded by: Khusro Faramurz Rustamji
- Succeeded by: Sharawan Tandon

Personal details
- Born: 28 December 1920 Jalandhar, Punjab Province, British India
- Died: 19 October 2015 (aged 94) New Delhi, India
- Spouse: Renu Kumar
- Children: 2
- Education: Government College, Lahore
- Occupation: Sports administrator; police officer
- Police career
- Country: India
- Allegiance: Indian Police Service
- Service years: 1942-1978
- Rank: Director General of Police

Ashwini Kumar (28 December 1920 –15 October 2015) was an Indian sports administrator and police officer. Kumar was noted as one of India's most prominent sports administrators and was also a decorated Indian Police Service (IPS) officer. He held positions in both international and Indian sports governing bodies.

Kumar's international positions included being a member of the International Olympic Committee (IOC) from 1973 to 2000, a member of the IOC Executive Board from 1980 to 1987 and once again from 1992 to 1996, Vice-President of the IOC from 1983 to 1987 and Vice-President of the International Hockey Federation for over 15 years. His positions in Indian sports administration included being President of the Indian Hockey Federation from 1958 to 1974 and Secretary General of the Indian Olympic Association from 1956 to 1960, and once again from 1970 to 1974.

Kumar was also a senior and decorated IPS officer. His police career lasted 36 years, and he was serving as the Director General of the Border Security Force when he retired in 1978. Kumar was awarded several decorations during his police career, including the Padma Bhushan, India's third-highest civilian award, in 1972.

Kumar died on 15 October 2015, at the age of 94, in New Delhi, India.

== Early life ==
Ashwini Kumar was born on 28 December 1920 in Jalandhar, Punjab Province, British India, to Dr. Vishwa Nath, a physician from Lahore. He attended university at the Government College, Lahore, where he was also part of the boxing club, and graduated in 1942 with a master's degree in History.

== Police career ==
Kumar began police his career in 1942. He achieved first place in the service examination and then joined the Imperial Police, the predecessor of the Indian Police Service, at the age of 22. During his police career, Kumar was involved in several notable cases. His first notable case came in 1951, when Kumar was sent by the Government of India to deal with the Bhupat gang that was active in Saurashtra, which is now part of Gujarat. Kumar successfully liquidated the Bhupat gang and the leader of the gang fled to Pakistan.

In 1965, Kumar, who at the time was a Deputy Inspector-General of Police arrested the killers of a former Chief minister of Punjab, Partab Singh Kairon. During the case, Kumar chased Sucha Singh, who was one of the killers, to Nepal before arresting him within Nepal. Kumar himself was arrested by the Nepalese Army and was forced to share a cell with Singh for over a week before Kumar was freed and made his way back to India.

Kumar joined the Border Security Force (BSF) when it was formed in 1965. Before becoming the Director General of the BSF in 1974, he was an Inspector General (IG) of the BSF (Western Frontier) and was in charge of the BSF's operations in the western front of the India-Pakistan border. At the same time as being the IG of the BSF (Western Frontier), Kumar was also the IG of Punjab Police. He became the Director General of the BSF in 1974.

Kumar's police career lasted for 36 years, and he was serving as the Director General of the BSF when he retired in 1978. Over the course of his police career, Kumar received the President’s Medal for Gallantry twice, the President’s Medal for Distinguished Service, the Police Medal for Meritorious Service and the Padma Bhushan in 1972.

== Sports administration career ==
Kumar held various positions in both Indian sports governing bodies and international sports governing bodies.

=== Indian sports administration ===
Kumar was the President of the Indian Hockey Federation (IHF) from 1958 to 1974. During his tenure as the President of the IHF, the India men's national field hockey team won the gold medal in the 1964 Summer Olympics and in the 1966 Asian Games, and the bronze medal in the 1968 Summer Olympics and in the 1972 Summer Olympics. Despite a successful tenure as the IHF President, Kumar was criticised for his selection procedures for the men's national team and for not taking any action to dispel the persistent rumours that Muslim players in the Indian team would not play at their best in the matches against Pakistan. He was also criticised for his authoritarian leadership, and a growing opposition against Kumar eventually forced him to resign from the presidency of the IHF.

Kumar's other positions in Indian sports administration include being the Secretary General of the Indian Olympic Association (IOA) for two terms. His first term as the Secretary General of the IOA lasted from 1956 to 1960 and his second term lasted from 1970 to 1974. Kumar eventually became the life President of the IOA. For 12 years, he also served as the President of the Punjab Olympic Association and the President of the Basketball Federation of India.

=== International sports administration ===
Kumar was a member of the International Olympic Committee (IOC) from 1973 to 2000, a member of the IOC Executive Board from 1980 to 1987 and from 1992 to 1996, Vice-President of the IOC from 1983 to 1987 and an honorary member of the IOC from 2000 to 2015. He also served on several IOC commissions and also served as the Vice-President of the International Hockey Federation for over 15 years. Kumar was the first individual from Asia, Africa or Latin America to become Vice-President of the IOC.

During his time in the IOC, Kumar became well known for his role in organising security for the Olympics. In 1983, Kumar first presented his views on how security for the Olympics Games should be handled, and this led Juan Antonio Samaranch, the IOC President at the time, to create the position of IOC Security Delegate for Kumar. He oversaw security for the Olympic Games from the 1980 Summer Olympics in Moscow to the 2000 Summer Olympics in Sydney. Kumar's leadership in and crucial contributions to Olympic security led to him being named Policeman of the Millennium in 2000 and he was also awarded an Olympic Order of Merit in 2002.

== Awards ==
- Padma Bhushan - 1972
- Olympic Council of Asia Order of Merit - 1990
- IOC’s Centenary Award - 1994
- Sports Distinction Medal by the Brazilian Government - 1996
- Olympic Order of Merit - 2002

== Personal life ==
Kumar was married to Renu Kumar, the niece of Guru Dutt Sondhi, who was the first Indian to become an IOC member. Kumar and Renu had two daughters: Rohini and Yamani. Kumar died on 15 October 2015, at the age of 94, in a hospital in New Delhi, India.
