= Narayana Ramachandran =

Indian sport administrator (1948/1949–2026)

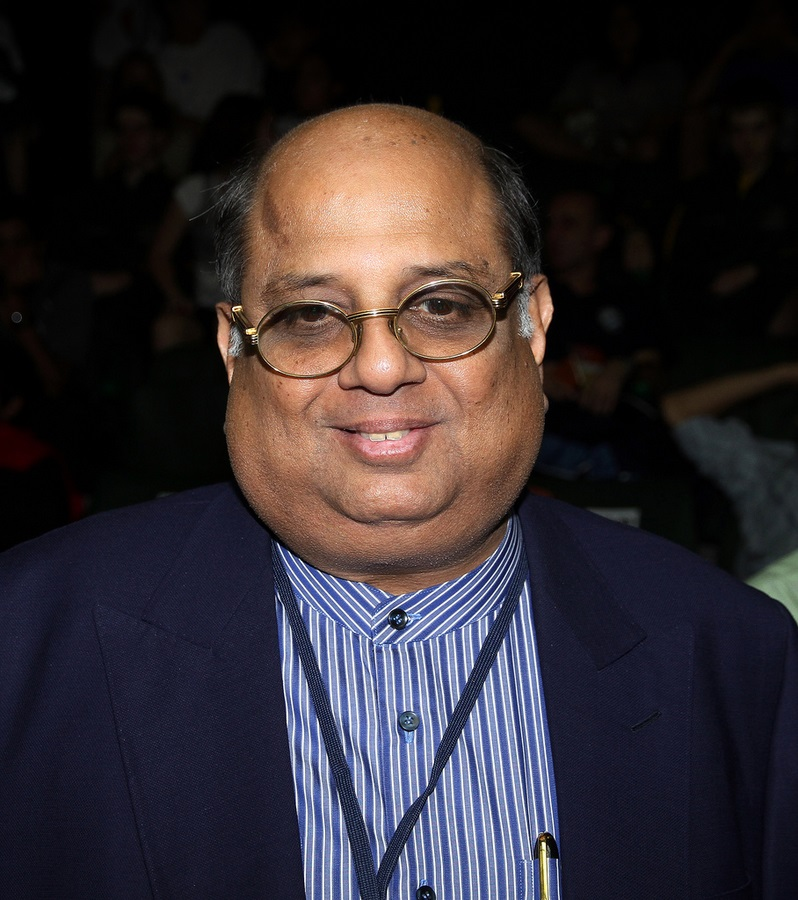
- Ramachandran in 2012

8th President of World Squash Federation
- In office 2008–2016
- Preceded by: Jahangir Khan
- Succeeded by: Jacques Fontaine

11th President of Indian Olympic Association
- In office 9 February 2014 – 14 December 2017
- Preceded by: Abhay Singh Chautala
- Succeeded by: Narinder Dhruv Batra

1st President of Indian Triathlon Federation
- Preceded by: Post Established
- Succeeded by: L. M. Sakthivel

Personal details
- Born: 1948 or 1949 India
- Died: 16 April 2026 (aged 77) Chennai, Tamil Nadu, India
- Spouse: Surekha Ramachandran
- Children: 2
- Awards: Olympic Order

Narayana Ramachandran (1948 or 1949 – 16 April 2026) was an Indian squash administrator and Triathlon administrator who served as the President of WSF (World Squash Federation). He was elected in 2008, succeeding Jahangir Khan of Pakistan. He also served as 12th president of Indian Olympic Association (IOA) from 9 February 2014 to 14 December 2017. He was the brother of the former chairman of BCCI and ICC, N Srinivasan. Ramachandran died on 16 April 2026, at the age of 77.

== See also ==
- World Squash Federation
- Indian Olympic Association

Civic offices
Preceded by Abhay Singh Chautala	President of Indian Olympic Association; 2014–2017	Succeeded by Narinder Dhruv Batra
