= MPFI =

MPFI may refer to:

- Multi-Point Fuel Injection
- Modern Pentathlon Federation of India, an Indian sports federation
- Max Planck Florida Institute for Neuroscience, a research facility located in Jupiter, Florida
