= Skateboarding in India =

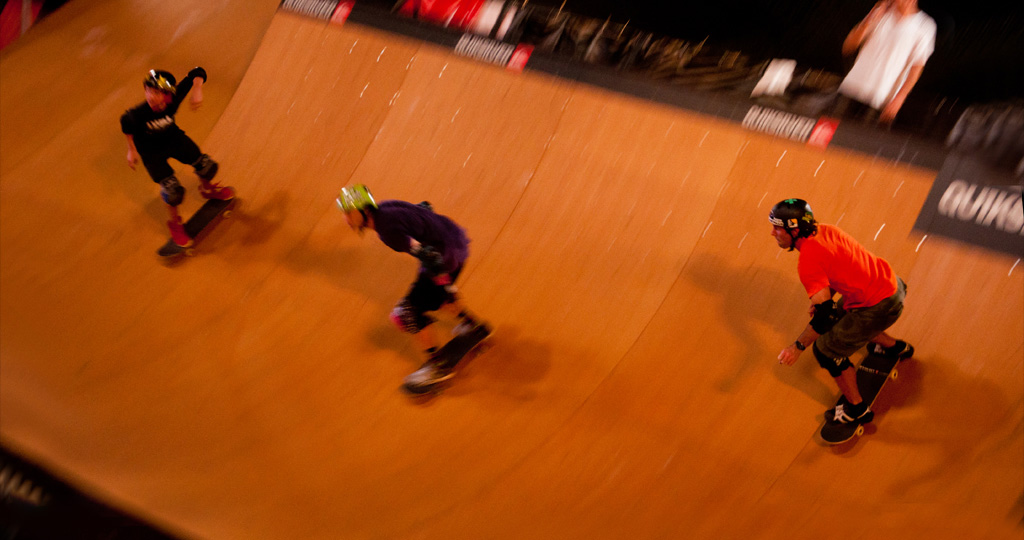
- Mitchie Brusco, Kevin Staab and Andy Macdonald at a skateboarding event in Mumbai in 2011
- Governing body: Roller Skating Federation of India (India Skate)

National competitions
- Recognised National Championships are organised by RSFI. Registrations can be done on www.indiaskate.com

Skateboarding is a sport that is rapidly rising in mainstream popularity in India.

Skateboarding is rising in popularity in all parts of India which includes Delhi, Chandigarh, Karnataka, Telangana, Tamil Nadu, Kerala, Maharashtra, Rajasthan, Odisha, Gujarat, Jammu and Kashmir and the Northeast states.

Skateboarding was included in 36th National Games held in Gujarat. 12 Skateboarders took on the podium. Skateboarding was excluded in 37th national games Goa and it is being considered for 38th National games Uttarakhand

Results for 36th National Games 2022, Street and Park Skateboarding events:

- Men's Park: Mahin Tandon (Karnataka), Shivam Balhara (Delhi), Vinish (Kerala)
- Women's Park : Vidya Das (Kerala), Kamali (Tamil Nadu), Aadya aditi (Delhi)
- Men's Street : Ranju Chingangbam (Manipur), Shubham Surana (MH), Nikhil Shelatkar (MH)
- Women's Street : Shraddha Gaikwad (MH), Urmila Pabale (MH), Meera Gautam (Delhi)

At the age of 8 years, Zarah Ann Gladys from Kerala (Lives in Dubai) became the youngest female to represent India in an International event, She achieved this feat by playing at the World Skateboarding Tour 2023 (Paris Olympic Qualifier) in Ostia, Italy.

At the age of 10 years Shivam Balhara from Delhi Became the youngest Male to represent India at an International event, He achieved this feat at the age of 10 years by representing India in Park world championships, Nanjing China in 2018.

Indian skateboarders have been participating in many major international sporting events but have been unable to qualify for Tokyo and Paris Olympics. Indian skateboarders will be trying to qualify for LA 2028 Olympics.

Indian Skateboarders who have represented India in world skate sanctioned international events are :

Country	Event Name	Discipline	Skateboarder Name	Skateboarder Name	Skateboarder Name
China	Park World Championships Nanjing 2018	Park	Shivam Balhara	Arun Kumar	Asha Gond
Barcelona	World Roller Games Barcelona 2019	Street	Shivam Balhara	Mahin Tandon	Shubham Surana
China	International Skateboarding open Street Championship, Henon, 2019	Street	Sagar Waghela	Mahin Tandon	
Brazil	WST Park World Championships, Sao Paulo 2019	Park	Arjun Madhav Rao		
UAE	WST Street World Championship, Sharjah 2022	Street	Shivam Balhara	Satyam Hangargekar	Shubham Surana
			Urmila Pabale	Nani Sonam	Shraddha Gaikwad
UAE	WST Park World Championship, Sharjah 2022	Park	Shivam Balhara		
Italy	WST Park World Championship Ostia 2023	Park	Shivam Balhara	Zarah ann Gladys	
Dubai	WST Park World Championship Dubai 2024	Park	Rishi Shewani	Zarah ann Gladys	
Dubai	WST Street World Championship Dubai 2024	Street	Yashodhan Patil		
Italy	World Skate Games Skateboarding Park, 2024 -Ostia	Park	Hiteshwaran	Hanvesh penugoda	Dhruvi Lakhotia
Brazil	World Championship, Sao Paulo, 2026	Street	Yoshiro Sarkar		
China	Asian Skateboarding Championships,Meishan 2026	Park	Shivam Balhara	Hiteshwaran	Siddharth Balhara
			AswinBala SD	Anwitha Meledath	
China	Asian Skateboarding Championships,Meishan 2026	Street	Shivam Balhara	Yashodhan Patil	Siddharth Balhara
			Naitik Dhankar	Ratish Srivastava	
Paraguay	World Roller Games, Asunción 2026	Street	Yoshiro Sarkar		

ProtoVillage in Anantapur, Andhra Pradesh, has emerged as a rural hub for skateboarding in India. The community built its first skatepark in 2018 and a second, larger park in 2025. Designed to be contest-ready, they host skate jams, contests and have athletes visiting giving local youth exposure to higher standards of the sport. Children from Proto Village have already won dozens of medals in state and national level skateboarding competitions having trained on their first park.

Integrated into ProtoVillage’s education and youth-development model, the skateparks provide local children from under resourced backgrounds sustained access to training, international skateboarders, and national-level contests. The project demonstrates how skateboarding can support rural empowerment, offering a positive lifestyle, skill development, and broader cultural exposure for youth outside major urban centres.This integration of sport, education, and rural development positions ProtoVillage as a notable contributor to the growth and diversification of skateboarding in India.

Delhi Skateboarding academy an indoor skateboarding training centre, the oldest in Delhi, completed its 10 years in 2026. Notable Delhi Skateboarding Athletes like Shivam Balhara, Siddharth Balhara, Shivam Tiwari, Meera Gautam, Naitik Dhankar, Ratish Srivastava, started their skateboarding journeys from DSA.

India's first rural skate park, Janwaar Castle, in Janwaar village in Bundelkhand, Madhya Pradesh, teaches children to skate. It is free of charge for village children, with the only condition that the children must attend school. The children respect girls and help to bridge caste differences.

In September 2023, Chandigarh skatepark was opened to the public. It is located next to the football turf in Tiranga Urban Park, across the Sector 17 market plaza. It spans a whopping 44,000 square feet, currently the biggest of its kind in the country.
