= Bowling in India =

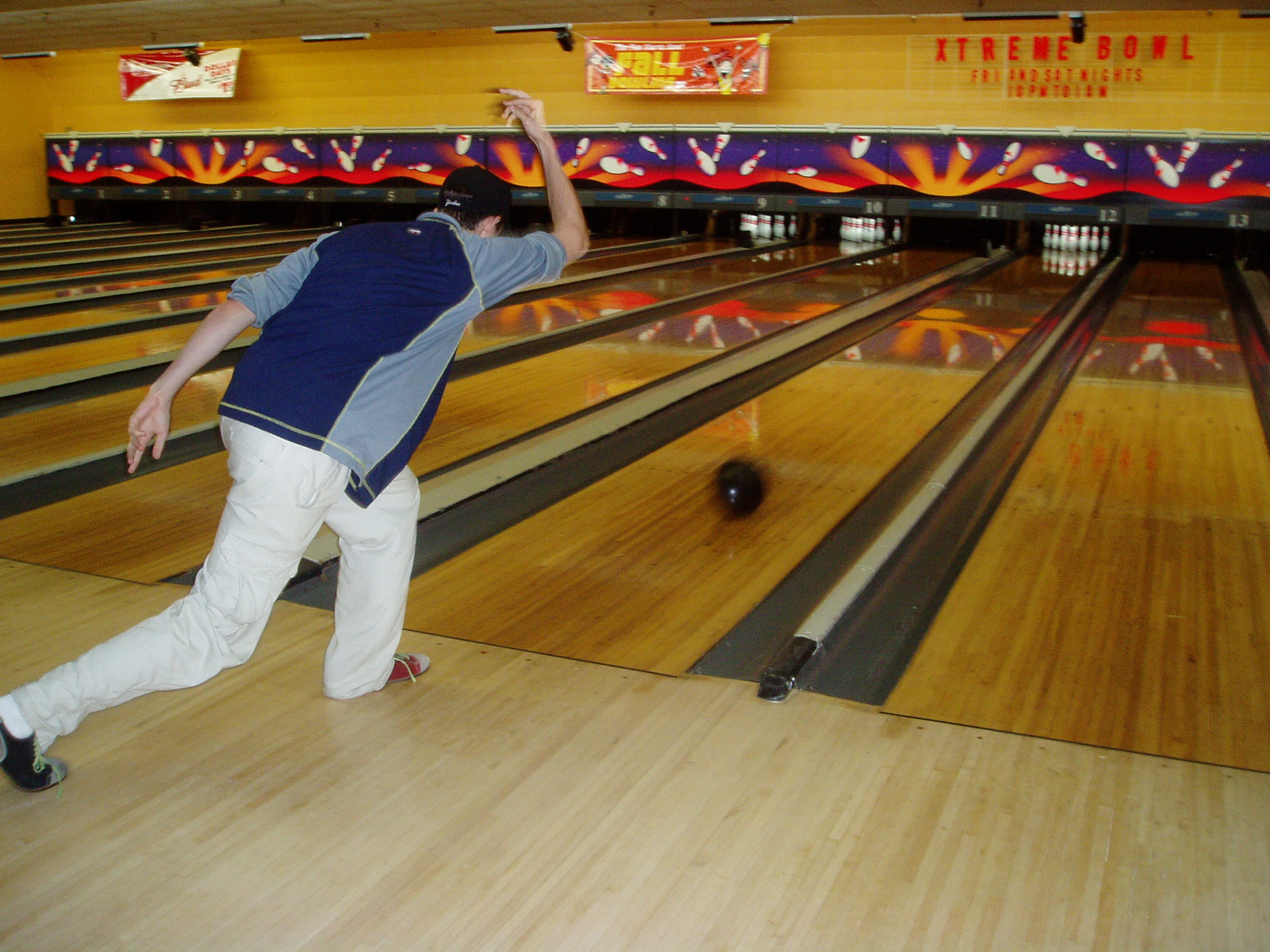
- A ten-pin bowler releases the ball
- Governing body: Tenpin Bowling Federation of India

Tenpin bowling is a popular and recreational sport in India. The activity is administered by the Bangalore-based Tenpin Bowling Federation of India. It organizes the National Bowling League comprising championships for amateurs, corporate team tournaments as well as a national tour for professionals. Many Indians take up bowling for fitness, rather than for recreation. Bowling alleys in India are commonly a part of multiplexes and malls.

In Chennai, the sport was widely known as "snow bowling" in the late 1990s and early 2000s, owing to its presence in the 'Snow Bowling' Centre in Chennai. The term "snow bowling" has been referenced in songs such as "Dey Nandakumara" from Seenu (2000), "Oh Mama Mama" from Minnale (2001), "Sandhippoma" in Enakku 20 Unakku 18 (2003) and "Kannin Maniye" from Gambeeram (2004).

In 2008, the Indian team participated in the WTBA World Tenpin Bowling Championships in Bangkok and the Commonwealth Tenpin Bowling Championships in Belfast.

== Total medals won by Indian bowlers in major tournaments ==
Competition	Gold	Silver	Bronze	Total
Commonwealth Championships	2	2	1	5
Asian Indoor and Martial Arts Games	0	0	1	1
Total	2	2	2	6

- updated till 2017

1) Commonwealth Tenpin Bowling Championships – 2002

  Mr. Shaik Abdu Hameed won 3 medals in this event…
  1) Gold Medal in Men’s Singles 2) Silver Medal in All Events 3) Gold Medal in Masters

2) Commonwealth Tenpin Bowling Championships – 2011

  1) Bronze Medal for Mixed Team (2 Men & 2 Women) 
  (Tamil Nadu Bowler Mr. Shabbir Dhankot was one of the team members)

3) Commonwealth Tenpin Bowling Championships – 2016

  1) Silver Medal for Men’s Singles (Mr. Akash Kumar, Karnatak Bowler)

Other Major Medals for India from Tenpin Bowling Championships

1) Asian Indore & Martial Arts Games – 2017

  1)Bronze Medal for Doubles (Mr. Shabbir Dhankot, Tamil Nadu & Mr. Dhruv Sarad, Delhi)

2) Asian Tenpin Bowling Championships – 2015

  1) Silver Medal for Men’s Singles (Tamil Nadu Bowler Mr. Shabbir Dhankot got the second medal for India)

== Lawn bowling ==
Indian women Lawn bowling team won their first international gold medal in 2022 Commonwealth Games. The game was part of the 2007 National Games. Indians also took part in it at the 2010 Commonwealth games. Bowling Federation of India is the game's national federation.

== Total medals won by Indian lawn bowlers in major tournaments ==
Competition	Gold	Silver	Bronze	Total
Commonwealth Games	1	1	0	2
Total	1	1	0	2

- updated till 2022
