= Susmita Mohanty =

Indian spaceship designer and space entrepreneur

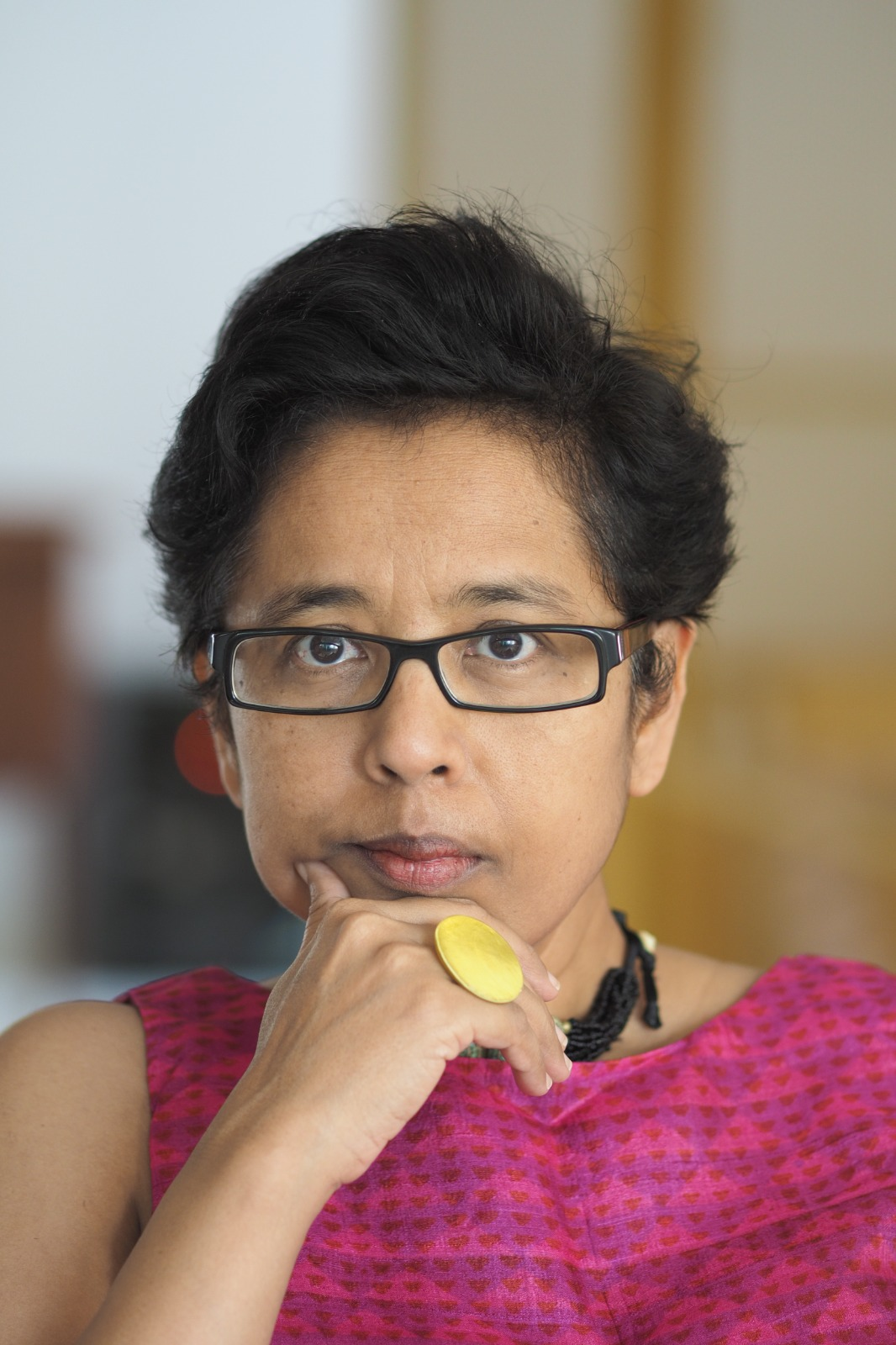
- Dr. Susmita Mohanty in 2024
- Born: 11 August 1971 (age 55); Cuttack, Odisha, India
- Education: L.D. College of Engineering (LDCE) National Institute of Design (NID); International Space University (ISU); Lund Institute of Technology (LTH) Chalmers Institute of Technology
- Occupations: Spaceship Designer; Serial Space Entrepreneur; Space Diplomat
- Known for: first space entrepreneur in the world to build three companies on three separate continents: MoonFront (2001–07) in San Francisco, Liquifier Systems Group (2004–present) in Vienna, and Earth2Orbit (2009–present) in Bangalore.
- Spouse: Siddharth Das
- Relatives: Nilamani Mohanty (father)

Susmita Mohanty (born 1971) is a spaceship designer, serial entrepreneur, and space diplomat. She is currently the Director General of Spaceport SARABHAI (S2) – India's ‘space’ think tank. She is the only space entrepreneur in the world to have started companies on three different continents in Asia, Europe and North America. Earth2Orbit, Bangalore (2009–2021), Liquifier Systems Group, Vienna (2004-ongoing), and MoonFront, San Francisco (2001–2007).

Prior to her entrepreneurial career, Mohanty worked on Shuttle-Mir missions at NASA Johnson in Houston and later for the International Space Station Program at Boeing in Huntington Beach. Since 1998, she has worked with American, Japanese, European, Russian, and Indian organizations in various capacities, including as an employee, consultant, contractor, and advisor.

== Professional life ==
Earth2Orbit, her third venture, was significant in opening the U.S. launch market for India. The company used space diplomacy to build trust between the two nations. It facilitated the first-ever launch agreement between ISRO's commercial arm Antrix and Skybox Imaging, a California-based satellite start-up. Google later acquired Skybox and renamed it Google Terra Bella. In June 2016, Google Terra Bella launched the first American microsatellite, SKYSAT Gen2-1, aboard the PSLV C-34.

In May 2024, Mohanty delivered the keynote address at the 248th U.S. Independence Day celebration hosted by the U.S. Consulate General in Mumbai in the presence of then Ambassador Eric Garcetti, US Consul General Mike Hankey, and Maharashtra Chief Secretary Nitin Kareer.

Industrialist Anand Mahindra and Mohanty were invited by the Principal Scientific Adviser to the Prime Minister of India, Prof. K. Vijay Raghavan, to the 13th meeting of the Prime Minister's Science Technology & Innovation Advisory Council (PM-STIAC) on July 24, 2020, to share insights on the "Role of start-ups and other enterprises towards Advancement in Space Technology." She was also invited by the Swiss Space Office to provide inputs for crafting the 2023 Swiss Space Policy.

In 2005, Mohanty was honored on Capitol Hill with an International Achievement Award from Women in Aerospace for promoting international cooperation through her orbital enterprise. In 2019, she was selected as one of BBC's 100 Women laureates. In 2017, she was featured on the cover of Fortune Magazine. In 2012, she was voted into the Financial Times’ list of ‘25 Indians to Watch’. On India's 75th anniversary of its independence, Mohanty was one of the 75 women honored by the Indian government with the Women Transforming India (WTI) Awards.

Mohanty serves on the advisory boards of the global alliance for Earth-Space Governance and the Space Centre at École Polytechnique Fédérale de Lausanne (EPFL), Switzerland. She was a member of the World Economic Forum (WEF) Global Future Council for Space Technologies from 2016 to 2024 and is a member of the board of the Centre for Space Futures, part of the WEF Centre for the Fourth Industrial Revolution (C4IR). She served on the Senate of her alma mater, the National Institute of Design (NID) in Ahmedabad, for a two-year term starting in 2019. She is a former non-resident scholar at Carnegie India.

In 2017, Mohanty served as an honorary Minister of State in Odisha on the invitation of then-Chief Minister Naveen Patnaik to lead the Mo School program, which aims to improve state-run schools through alumni engagement.

In 2017, Mohanty participated in the first Antarctic Biennale. In 2009, she visited the Arctic to deliver an invited lecture at the Swedish Institute of Space Physics in Kiruna.

Mohanty has also advocated for the use of space technology for climate action, citing Earth-observation satellites for their role in monitoring and mitigating climate change.

Mohanty is the co-founder of the City As a Spaceship (CAAS) Collective. CAAS promotes a new way of thinking about humans and their relationships with their habitats, transporters, and environment, aiming to design future cities as small, spaceship-like closed-loop eco-systems. The CAAS Collective was invited for residencies by KHOJ Studios, New Delhi in 2018 and by Cove Park in Loch Long, Scotland, in 2022.

In 2025, Mohanty was selected for a residency at the Rockefeller Center's Bellagio Center, joining a class of 105 global leaders from 33 countries. In 2025, Mohanty launched her first podcast ‘Space for Diplomacy'. Mohanty is represented by multiple speaker bureaus, including the London Speaker Bureau.

In her contribution to KPMG's "30 Voices on 2030: The Future of Space" report in May 2020, Mohanty stated that the space race of the 21st century would be between private companies rather than nations.

== Early life and career ==
Mohanty was born in Cuttack, Odisha. She was raised in Ahmedabad among space pioneers such as Prof. Yash Pal and Prof. E.V. Chitnis, as well as contemporary architects such as B.V. Doshi and Anant Raje. Her father Nilamani Mohanty was among the early ISRO pioneers hired by Dr. Vikram Sarabhai, the founder of the Indian space programme.

Mohanty was educated in India, France, and Sweden. She has a Bachelor's Degree in Electrical Engineering from L.D. College of Engineering at Gujarat University, and Master's Degree in Industrial Design from the National Institute of Design in Ahmedabad, a Master's in Space Studies from the International Space University (ISU) in Strasbourg, France, a Licentiate Degree from Lund Institute of Technology, Sweden and a PhD from the Chalmers Institute of Technology, Sweden. Science Fiction writer Sir Arthur C. Clarke personally sponsored her tuition at ISU.

Inspired by India’s space pioneers and contemporary architects during her formative years in Ahmedabad, in the 1970s and 80s, after completing her graduation in 1996, Mohanty chose to pursue the new field of ‘Space Architecture’. She moved to California in 1998 and became an active member of the Space Architect community at the American Institute of Aeronautics and Astronautics (AIAA). In 2002, Mohanty participated in the crafting of ‘The Millenium Charter – Fundamental Principles of Space Architecture’ at the Houston Space Congress.

Mohanty spent the first decade of her Space Career, designing space habitation, transportation, exploration systems, first through NASA Johnson Space Center, and later through her company LIQUIFER Systems Group in Vienna. Between 1998-2000, Mohanty worked in business development for the International Space Station (ISS) Program at Boeing in Huntington Beach.

== Awards and honours ==
- Rockefeller Foundation Bellagio Center Resident (2025): Selected as one of 105 global leaders from 33 countries for the highly selective residency program.
- Board Member, Centre for Space Futures, Saudi Arabia (2024)
- Member, Advisory Board, Global Alliance for Earth-Space Governance (2024)
- Member, Advisory Board, Space Centre at École Polytechnique Fédérale de Lausanne (EPFL), Switzerland (2024)
- 100 Women Achievers, India Today Magazine (2024)
- Women Transforming India Award, NITI Aayog (2022)
- BBC 100 Women Laureate (2019)
- Awardee, Prabasi Odia Samman, award conferred by Odisha Forum, New Delhi (2018)
- Financial Times, 25 Indians to Watch (2012)
- International Achievement Award, Women in Aerospace, Washington DC (2005)

== Selected publications ==
- Seventy-five years on, the International Astronautical Congress needs a grand reset, Friends of Europe, 2025
- Time for ESA to chart its own course and reduce NASA dependency, Friends of Europe, 2025
- Why does Gaganyaan crew have no women? History shows India has no excuses, The Print, India, 2024
- Let’s send a woman to space, Economic Times, India, 2024
- ISRO Dares Mighty Things, Carnegie India, 2023
- Chandrayaan-3 Enters Lunar Orbit, South Pole Beckons, Economic Times, India, 2023
- Interpreting India’s onboarding to the Artemis club, Opinion Piece, Friends of Europe, Brussels, 2023
- STIRship Enterprise: a series on Space Architecture and Design, STIR World magazine, a series of essays on human space ferries, 2021
- Can COP26 help de-junk Low Earth Orbit? Soundings - ISSN 1362-6620, Planetary Imagination: Special Issue for global climate justice, Volume 2021 Number 78
- NewSpace India and IN-SPACe: A fledgling and critical partnership, Technical Paper, Special Focus: NewSpace India, NewSpace - The Journal of Space Entrepreneurship and Innovation, Editor-in-Chief: Ken Davidian, PhD, 2021
- Why billionaires playing space ping pong leaves me cold, Opinion Piece, The Brilliant, Sydney, 2021
- 30 Voices on 2030: The Future of Space, Visionary Statement, KPMG International, Collected perspectives of 30 leaders from the space industry around the world, 2020
- Artemis Accords: a step toward space mining and colonisation? Opinion Piece, Friends of Europe, Brussels, 2020
- Outer Space, the new Wild West, Friends of Europe, 2019
- I hope the next ISRO Chief is a Woman, The Hindu, India, 2019
