= Softball Association of India =

Indian sporting association

- Sport: Softball
- Jurisdiction: India
- Membership: State/UT associations
- Abbreviation: SBAI
- Founded: 21 November 1961; 64 years ago
- Affiliation: International Softball Federation
- Affiliation date: 1965
- Regional affiliation: Softball Confederation of Asia
- Headquarters: 26, Sikh Mohalla, M.G. Road, Indore, Madhya Pradesh
- President: Rana Gurmeet Singh Sodhi
- CEO: Pravin Anaokar
- Secretary: L.R Maurya

Official website
- www.softballindia.com
- (India)

The Softball Association of India (SBAI) is the governing body for softball in India. Legally, it is a non-profit association registered under the Societies Registration Act, 1860.

Men's Team Captain

The captain of Indian softball men's team is Mr.Ajmal Puthiyapalam from Keralam,who has currently been serving as a State Tax Officer(STO) in the State GST Department, Government of Keralam.He is currently working in Taxpayer Services Circle, Thirurangadi, Malappuram district,Kerala,as the STO.He hails from Beypore in Kozhikode district of Keralam.

Ajmal Puthiyapalam

Ajmal Puthiyapalam is an Indian international softball player, sports leader, and government officer from Beypore, Kozhikode, Kerala. He has represented India in senior-level international softball competitions and served as Captain of the Indian Senior Softball Team. Alongside his sporting career, he has built a career in public service and currently serves as a State Tax Officer in the Kerala State GST Department, Government of Kerala.

Sporting Career

Ajmal has represented India in major international softball competitions, including the Senior Softball World Cup in Yukon, Canada, the Senior Asia Cup in Japan, and the Senior Asian Softball Championship in Thailand. He has also served as Captain of the Indian Senior Softball Team.

A versatile multi-sport athlete, he is also a national-level athlete and National footballer. He represented the Indian Postal football Team and the National Civil Services football Team. He was the winning captain of the Calicut University team and the winning captain of the Senior Kerala team.

Professional Career

Ajmal began his government service with the Department of Posts, Government of India, before joining the Kerala State Goods and Services Tax (SGST) Department. He currently serves as a State Tax Officer (STO) at the Taxpayer Services (TPS) Circle, Malappuram.

His career combines international sport, team leadership, higher education, and public service.

Education

- Master of Commerce (M.Com) — Farook College, Kozhikode

- Bachelor of Commerce (B.Com) — Government Arts & Science College, Kozhikode

- Master of Physical Education (M.P.Ed.) — Government College of Physical Education, Kozhikode

- M.A Sociology (Sacred Heart college Thevara,kochi)

Sporting Representation

Softball — India

- Indian Senior Softball Team — Captain

- Senior Softball World Cup — Yukon, Canada

- Senior Asia Cup — Japan

- Senior Asian Softball Championship — Thailand

Team Representation

- Indian Postal football Team

- National Civil Services football Team

- Winning Captain — Calicut University Team

- Winning Captain — Senior Kerala Team

Public Service

- Department of Posts, Government of India — Former

- Kerala SGST Department, Government of Kerala — State Tax Officer

- Taxpayer Services (TPS) Circle, Malappuram

== History ==
Softball was first played in India in 1944 by United States Army servicemen stationed in Jodhpur, Rajasthan during World War II. Some locals played with the Americans and learned the game from them. Among them was Dashrath Mal Mehta, considered the father of Indian softball. Mehta founded the Softball Association of India in Jodhpur on 21 November 1961 with the support of L.M. Singhavi, Anand Singh Kachawa, Madanlal Pungalia, and K.D. Gautam. The Association came into contact with members of the International Softball Federation (ISF), the sport's international governing body, in 1964 and invited them to play a game in India. The SBAI officially became affiliated with the ISF in 1965.

The United States women's softball team visited India and played an exhibition game against an Indian team at Calcutta in 1965. The American team was accompanied by ISF President W.W. Khetan, Secretary Don A. Porter, Umpire in Chief Dickston who conducted the first official clinic for Indian softball umpires. The delegation also helped the SBAI publish the first rule book on softball in the country, and the system of umpiring the game.

The Association was officially recognized by the Indian Olympic Association in 1967, and in the same year, it organized the first National Softball Championship for men and women at Jodhpur in 1967. Teams from Andhra Pradesh, Delhi, Maharashtra and Rajasthan participated in the tournament. The SBAI was recognized by the Ministry of Sports and Youth Affairs in 1973.

SBAI has also helped organise Baseball5 competitions (see also: India national Baseball5 team).
