= Roller sport in India =

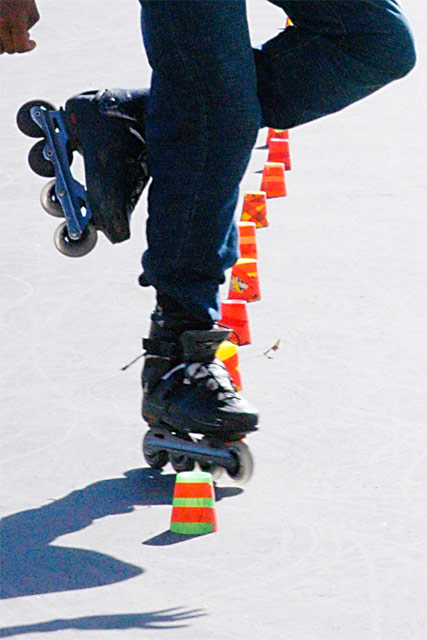
- Inline roller skater on a slalom course
- Country: India
- Governing body: Roller Skating Federation of India
- National team: India national roller hockey team

National competitions
- Indian Roller Hockey National Championship

International competitions
- 2 bronze medals in the 2010 Asian Games

Roller sport is popular as a recreational sport in India, specially roller skating for children, and it is gaining popularity as a competitive sport. There are clubs in cities and towns, and roller skating is taught in some schools of urban areas.

== Structure ==
Roller sports in India are governed by the Roller Skating Federation of India, which was founded by S.P.Mumick in 1955. Tulsi Agarwal has been a long time office bearer of the federation. Individual skaters are registered with a club. The clubs are registered with district associations, which are in turn affiliated with the state associations. The state associations are affiliated with the RSFI.

== Disciplines ==
Speed skating, artistic skating, and roller hockey are the three types of roller sports that are common in India. Roller hockey is more popular in the north of India as compared to south India. The popularity of roller hockey is in part due to the popularity of field hockey, which is the country's national sport. Similarly, 'roller basketball' and 'roller cricket' is also played in parts of the country.

== Important venues ==
The roller skating rink at The Rink Pavilion in Mussoorie is one of the largest and most historic rinks in India. India's first international-standard banked track is at the roller sports centre in Virar, Mumbai. The 50th National Speed Roller Skating Championships were held here in January 2013. Another banked track is at the D.A.V. Public School in Faridabad. A banked-track of international standards also been made at Viman Nagar, Pune, Maharashtra.

== Achievements ==
In the 2010 Asian Games, Anup Kumar Yama won bronze in the men's single free skating long programme. Anup Kumar and Avani Bharath Panchal clinched another bronze in the pairs skating long programme. The Indian contingent also performed well, winning 30 medals at the 14th Asian Roller Sports Championship in Kaohsiung, Taiwan. An Indian schoolboy, Rohan Ajit Kokane holds the world record for Limbo skating.

== Total medals won in Roller Sports in Major tournaments ==
Competition	Gold	Silver	Bronze	Total
Asian Games	0	0	4	4
Asia Cup	4	5	6	15
Total	4	5	10	19

- updated till 2023

=== List of National Sports award recipients in Roller Sports, showing the year, award, and gender ===
Year	Recipient	Award	Gender
1987	Naman Virendra Parekh	Arjuna Award	Male
2015	Anup Kumar Yama	Arjuna Award	Male

== See also ==
- Category:Indian roller skaters
