= Guru Dutt Sondhi =

Indian sports administrator

Member of the International Olympic Committee
- In office 1932–1966

2nd Secretary General of the Indian Olympic Association
- In office 1938–1952
- Preceded by: A. G. Noehren
- Succeeded by: Moin-ul-Haq

Principal Government College, Lahore
- In office 1939–1945
- Preceded by: Dr. H. B. Dunnicliff
- Succeeded by: Prof. E. Dickenson

Personal details
- Born: 10 December 1890 Lahore, Punjab Province, British India
- Died: 20 November 1966 India
- Spouse: Enid Sondhi
- Education: Government College, Lahore; Trinity College, Cambridge
- Occupation: Principal, Sports administrator

Guru Dutt Sondhi (10 December 1890 – 20 November 1966) was an Indian sports administrator in India. Sondhi was manager of the British Indian Olympic hockey team at the 1932 Summer Olympics, founder of the Western Asiatic Games, and the founder of the Asian Games Federation, which held the first Asiad At the time of the inaugural Asian Games in New Delhi, he was the Secretary General of the Indian Olympic Association. He also served as the principal of Government College, Lahore, from 1939 to 1945.

== Early life ==
Guru Dutt Sondhi was born on 10 December 1890 in the city of Lahore, then in British India now in Pakistan, to a Punjabi family. His father was a barrister in Jalandhar, Punjab. He attended Government College, Lahore from 1905 to 1911 and then Trinity College, Cambridge, England from 1911 to 1914. He was interested in sports. During his study years in the Government College he was the half-mile and cross-country sports champion of University of the Punjab in 1911. He was also the member of Trinity College's hockey team.

He is in a photograph of India's 1928 Olympic team that they signed.

== Sports and University Administrator ==
Guru Dutt Sondhi served in several positions:

- Professor at Punjab University, Lahore
- Honorary Secretary of the Punjab Olympic Association, 1924-36.
- Chairman of the Punjab Olympic Association, 1936-45 & President for some years.
- Second Secretary General of the Indian Olympic Association since 1927
- Manager for the Indian Olympic athletics team at the 1928 Olympics.
- Manager for the Indian Olympic hockey team at the 1932 Olympics.
- Principal of Government College University, Lahore, 1939–45; when his term ended in 1945, became sports advisor to the Government of India.
- The first President of the Athletics Federation of India (1946–50) and Vice-President of the International Hockey Federation in 1946.
- Founder of the 1951 Asian Games.
- International Olympic Committee (IOC) member from 1932 until his death in 1966.

== The First Asian Games ==
The idea for Asian sports, going back to the Western Asiatic Games (1934) and the Far Eastern Championship Games (1913-1934), was reborn shortly before the end of the Second World War and discussed during the Asian Relations Conference held under the leadership of Jawaharlal Nehru shortly before India's Independence in 1947. The idea was translated into reality during the 1948 London Olympic Games when India’s Prof. Guru Dutt Sondhi, Jorge B. Vargas (from the Philippines), and others called a meeting to form the Asian Games Federation (AGF). East Asian and Southeast Asian delegates, contemplating about recreating the Far Eastern Championship Games, eventually decided to join the meeting and to host the First Asian Games in Shanghai. This could not be realized due to the Chinese Civil War, meaning that Sondhi later agreed to host the event in India. Following this, the AGF was formalised at Delhi’s Patiala House on 12–13 February 1949, and delegates drafted and accepted a constitution. The charter members forming the federation were Afghanistan, Burma, Ceylon (now Sri Lanka), the Dutch East Indies (now Indonesia), India, Nepal, Pakistan, the Philippines, and Thailand, while the Iranian nominee could not attend.

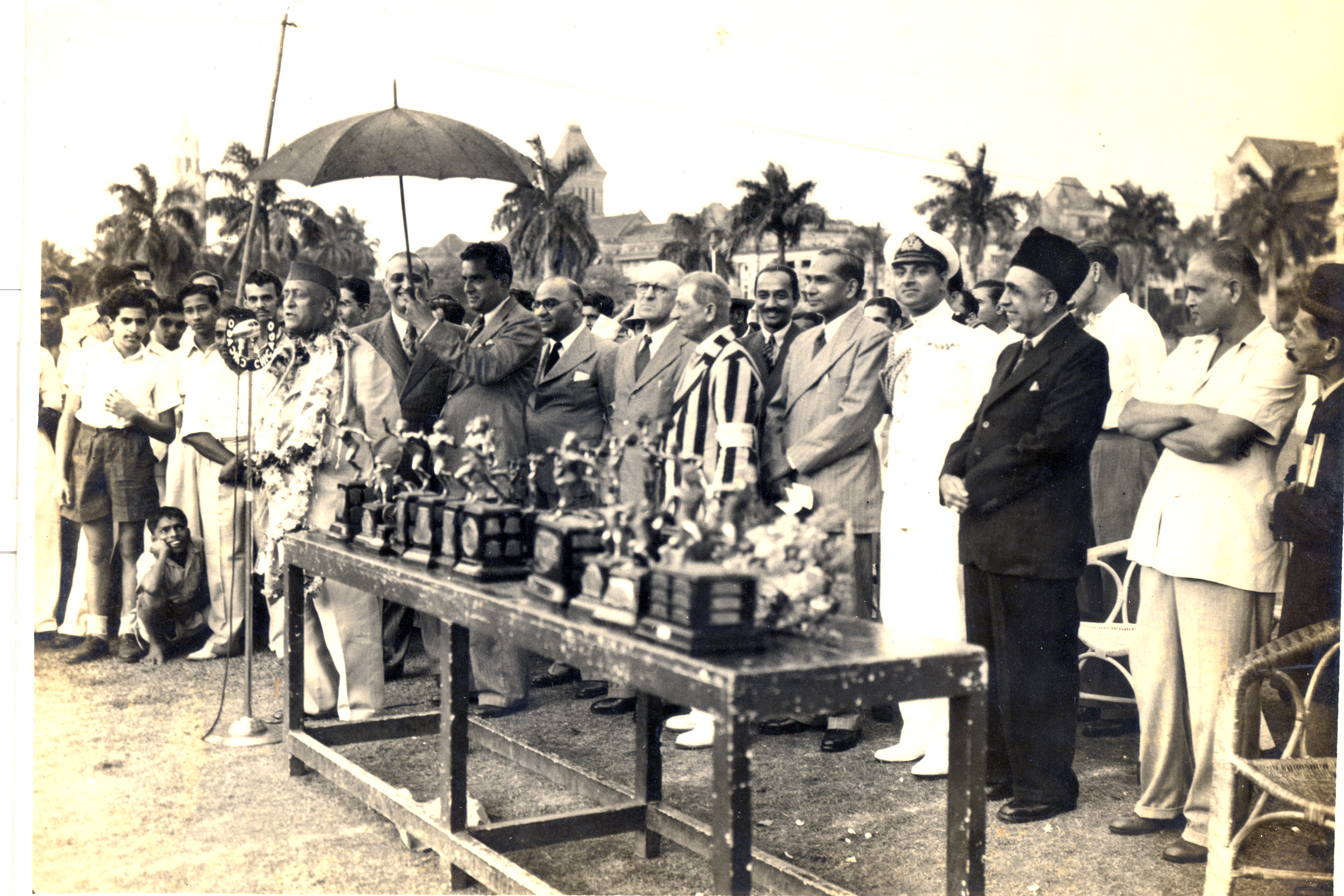
At Indian National Games of 1950: left to right: Governor of Bombay Raja Maharaja Singh under umbrella, x, x(holding umbrella), Nalini Ranjan Sarker, x, Sohrab Bhoot (in striped blazer), x, G.D. Sondhi, naval captain

The delegates also decided to hold the Asian Games after every four years, midway between the Olympic Games; at a later meeting, during the First Asian Games, they agreed on the simple motto which was designed and proposed by Guru Dutt Sondhi: "Ever Onward". The official flag, inspired by the flag Sondhi had designed for the Western Asiatic Games, shows a red sun that represents the ever glimmering and warm spirit of the Asian people.

== See also ==
- Asian Games
