= Chhattisgarh Olympic Association =

State Olympic committee

- Abbreviation: COA
- Type: Sports Association
- Headquarters: Raipur, Chhattisgarh
- Members: Indian Olympic Association; Olympic Council of Asia
- President: Bhupesh Baghel
- Secretary General: Devender Singh Yadav

Chhattisgarh Olympic Association (COA) is the governing body of sports in Chhattisgarh. It is responsible for selecting athletes to represent India at the Olympic Games, Commonwealth Games, Asian Games and National Games of India.
