= India national Baseball5 team =

India

Information
- Country: Republic of India
- Federation: Softball Association of India
- Confederation: WBSC Asia

WBSC ranking
- Current: 51 ▼2 (7 August 2026)

The India national Baseball5 team represents the Republic of India in international Baseball5 competitions.

== History ==
Baseball5 was first introduced in India in 2019 by Punjab Baseball. The national softball association has sponsored B5 competitions and translated the rulebook.

India participated in the 2023 Baseball5 Youth Asia Cup and ended in last place.

== Current roster ==
As of 2023

=== Youth team ===
No.	Pos.	Player	Gender
1	UTL	Choudhary Laxmi	F
6	UTL	Shrejas Naik	M
2	UTL	Ayush Sharma	M
4	UTL	Mantekvir Singh Sidhu	M
3	UTL	Palak Soni	F

==== Staff ====
No.	Pos.	Name
-	Coach	Harish Kumar
-	Coach	Ashok Kumar Sharma

== Tournament record ==
=== Baseball5 Youth Asia Cup ===
Baseball5 Youth Asia Cup record
Year	Round	Position	W	L	RS	RA
(Malaysia) 2023	Group stage	7th	0	6	-	-
Total	-	7th	0	6	-	-
