= Adille Sumariwalla =

Indian sports administrator and athlete (born 1958)

Vice-President of Indian Olympic Association
- In office 14 December 2017 – 10 December 2022
- Succeeded by: Ajay Patel

President of Indian Olympic Association (Acting)
- In office 27 August 2022 – 10 December 2022
- Preceded by: Anil Khanna
- Succeeded by: P. T. Usha

Personal details
- Born: 1 January 1958 (age 68) India
- Spouse: Armaity Sumariwalla (1986)
- Children: 2
- Sports career
Medal record
Men's athletics
Representing India
Asian Championships
Bronze medal – third place	1979 Tokyo	4×100 m

Dr. Adille J. Sumariwalla (born 1 January 1958) is an Indian sports administrator, former athlete and entrepreneur, who represented India at the 1980 Moscow Olympics. Sumariwalla competed as a 100m runner in several international competitions and at the Olympics. Currently, he is the president of the Athletics Federation of India, and was elected as one of the members of council of IAAF at its 50th congress, thus becoming the first Indian to do so. He is also an entrepreneur and owns many media businesses in India, after tenures at some media companies including the American Media Company.

== Educational Background ==
Sumariwalla completed his schooling at St. Mary's school, Mumbai. His educational qualifications include a Bachelor's Degree in Financial Accounting and Auditing from the University of Bombay alongside a Master's Degree in Business Management from the University of Mumbai. He pursued an MBA from the Asian Institute of Management in Manila and continued his education at the Harvard Business School - India Research Centre He was a treasurer at the Olympians Association of India and a member of the Terry Fox Committee in India. He has collected over USD 10 Million since its inception. He acted as a member of the Academic Council at the University of Bombay and the Academic Council at the Shivaji University of Kolhapur.

== Athletics career ==
Adille Sumariwalla participated in the OLYMPIC GAMES, Moscow 1980 along with bagging a medal at the Asian Track and Field Championships, Tokyo 1979. He shone brightly when he bagged the gold medal at the South Asian Games in 1984 and held the National Record for 18 years in the 100m sprint category. The State Government awarded him for his Excellence in Athletics in the year 1980 alongside his Excellence in Coaching in 1999. He also played a vital role in coaching Olympians, International & National athletes. Sumariwalla has been an athlete since his school and college days. He had set the men's 200m Collegiate Record and held it for 35 years, until Gaurang Amre broke the record. He expressed gladness as the record was broken, but at the same time expressed concern over the time taken to break the record, quoting these records should be broken "every two or three years". He has won the national title in 100m sprint 11 times. Sumariwalla represented India at the 1980 summer olympics as a hundred-meter sprinter. He has been the Chef-de-Mission for the Indian contingent, for the 2014 Asian Games held in Incheon, South Korea. Sumariwalla is of the opinion that there has been great increase in infrastructure for sports by the government in recent years, and has quoted that "The day is not far when India can expect an Olympics Medal in Athletics". He has also been quoted as saying "If athletes do not perform well in the Olympics, we will take action against them." His dream finally came through when Neeraj Chopra won a Gold Medal at Tokyo Olympics, under his Presidency.

== Sports Administration Experience ==
Sumariwalla has been a council member for IAFF since 2015 where he served as the Chair of the Strategic Communications Advisory Group and the Age Manipulation Committee alongside being a member of the Development Committee. He was President of the Athletics Federation and Vice President of the National Olympic Committee. He furthered his sports administration experience by functioning as a member of the Olympic Council of Asia under the Sports and Environment Committee. At the Asian Athletics Championships (2013 & 2017) he contributed as the Chairman of the Organising Committee. He was chosen as a Member of the Organising Committee for WA Permit Meetings, Commonwealth Games (2010), Commonwealth Youth Games (2008), Indian National Games (1994 & 2020). Adding to his accomplishments in the field of sports administration, he conformed as the Chef-de-Mission for the 2014 Asian Games. He was also appointed as a Member of the 'Mission Olympic Cell' by the Government of India in preparation for the 2020 & 2024 Olympic Games. He even functioned as a member of the Core Team for the Fit India Movement and the Governing Council for the Khelo India Scheme.

== Professional Experience ==
Sumariwalla founded and acted as the Managing Director at a media house, Interspace Communications Pvt. Ltd. He also served as a Board Director at SE TransStadia Holdings Ltd., Next Radio Ltd., Next MediaWorks Ltd, Professional Sports Services (1) Pvt. Ltd., Syngience Broadcast Ahmedabad Ltd. President, Provost, TransStadia Education and Research Foundation (TERF). He operated as the Former CEO of Clear Channel (India), Asian Age Newspaper and the Founder Director of the Indian Outdoor Advertising Association. He was a part of the Governing Council, Sports, PE, Fitness and Leisure of the Skills Council of India. Alongside these experiences, he also acted as a Member of the Sports Committee for the Federation of Indian Chamber of Commerce as well as the Industry and National Committee on Sports of the Confederation of Indian Industry.

== Entrepreneurship ==
Apart from athletics, Sumariwalla has been a part of many Media businesses, corporations and education. He started his professional career with Tata Engineering and Locomotive co. (now Tata Motors). He worked there for 15 years in various domains, after which he was appointed as the founding CEO of The Asian Age in 1994. He has since worked with many other organisations, notably Mid Day Multimedia and Clear Channel. He was responsible for setting up the Outdoor Division at Mid Day in 1997, which then merged its tasks with Clear Channel International. After serving eight years as the Chairman and Managing Director, he left Clear Channel and founded Interspace Communications where he is the Managing Director He has also been a Director on the Board of Next Media Works and SE TransStadia Ltd.

== Integrity and Ethics ==
Sumariwalla was Chair of the World Athletics for the Age Manipulation Committee and a member of the World Athletics Risk Committee for the Human Rights Working Group. He also functioned as Chair for Next MediaWorks Limited (A Public Listed Company) for the Audit & Remuneration Committees. He was a Member of the Olympic Council of Asia under the Sports and Environment Committee. He operated as President of the First National Federation in India to introduce and enforce the 'No Needle Policy.

== Communications and Media ==
Adille Sumariwalla was Chair of the World Athletics Strategic Communications Advisory Group and Former CEO of the Multinational Newspaper. He served as the Executive Director of a large Media Group with interests related to Print, Internet, TV, Radio, Movies and Outdoor Advertising Meanwhile, he established and formed his own Media Company (founded in 2013) and has successfully run National and his International Media, Communication and Advertising businesses for over 25 years.

Civic offices
Preceded by Anil Khanna	Acting President of Indian Olympic Association; 2022	Succeeded by P. T. Usha
