= Narinder Batra =

IOC member

12th President of Indian Olympic Association
- In office 14 December 2017 – 25 May 2022
- Preceded by: Narayana Ramachandran
- Succeeded by: Anil Khanna

11th President of International Hockey Federation
- In office 2016–2022
- Preceded by: Leandro Negre
- Succeeded by: Tayyab Ikram

President of Hockey India
- In office 2014–2016
- Preceded by: Mariyamma Koshy
- Succeeded by: Mariyamma Koshy

Narinder Dhruv Batra (born 19 April 1957, India) was a member of the International Olympic Committee (IOC) from 2019 to 2022.

== Education ==
Batra studied at the Amar Singh College where he received his Bachelor of Arts in 1977. He then went on to study law at the University of Kashmir, where he received his Bachelor in 1981. He received two honorary Doctorates in Philosophy from the Teerthanker Mahaveer University in 2012, and from the Manav Rachna Educational Institutions in 2019.

== Career ==
From 1997 until 2010, then again from 2012 until 2014, Batra was President of the Hockey Jammu & Kashmir. In 2014 until 2016, he was the President at Hockey India. He was the Chairman for the Hockey India League from 2012 to 2016, and for the Organising Committee of nine international hockey tournaments in India between 2012 and 2015.

Batra was also treasurer for the Delhi & District Cricket Association from 2003 to 2013, and vice-president of the Asian Hockey Federation from 2003 to 2013.

In 2018, he was President of the Commonwealth Games Association of India, a member of the Governing Board National Anti-Doping Agency (NADA India) and a member of the CSR Committee of Ministry of Corporate Affairs for the Government of India.

He held various positions in the Indian Hockey Federation including, vice-president from 2002 to 2012, member of the Competitions Committee from 2012 to 2014, Executive Board Member from 2014 to 1016, then President starting in 2016.

For the Indian Olympic Association (IOA) he was vice-president from 2012 until 2014, then associate vice-president from 2013 until 2017, when he was then elected president.

He became a member of the International Olympic Committee in 2019, and was a member of the IOC Olympic Channel Commission in 2020.

In May, Batra had his position as life membership in Hockey India removed as it was deemed in contempt by the Delhi High Court. Which led to him stepping down as president of the Indian Olympics Association (IOA) as well as the International Hockey Federation (FIH) in 2022. At the same time, he stepped down as member of the IOC. Shortly after his resignation, the Central Bureau of Investigation (CBI) filed a case against him for allegedly misusing Hockey India funds.

=== Sports career ===
Batra played hockey from 1970 until 1980, where he competed at various levels.

Civic offices
Preceded by Narayana Ramachandran	President of Indian Olympic Association; 2017–2022	Succeeded by Anil Khanna
