= Indian Arm Wrestling Federation =

- Sport: Arm Wrestling
- Jurisdiction: India
- Founded: 1977
- Headquarters: Chhattisgarh

Official website
- indianarmwrestling.com

Indian Arm Wrestling Federation is the governing body for arm wrestling in India.

== History ==
Indian Arm Wrestling Federation was formed in 1977 to promote Arm Wrestling as sport in India. Arm Wrestling also called as "Panja" has been promoted through Pro Panja League (PPL) set up in Year 2020 for organising League matches.

== Tournaments ==
Indian Arm Wrestling Federation conducted 45th Arm Wrestling Championship in Srinagar with the support of Jammu and Kashmir Arm Wrestling Association.

Indian Arm Wrestling Federation has also been organising regular league level matches across India every year.

== Competitions ==
Indian Arm Wrestling Federation sent 43 member team to World Arm Wrestling Championships held at Almaty, Kazaksthan from August 24 to September 3.

== See also ==
- Indian Olympic Association
