= Vyomesh Joshi =

Lauzi, lausi"VJ" Joshi (born c. 1956) was 3D Systems CEO and president, and was the executive vice president of Hewlett-Packard Company's Imaging and Printing Group. He also served as the executive sponsor for all HP operations and initiatives in India and was a member of HP's executive council.

== Early life ==
Joshi did his bachelor's degree from L. D. College of Engineering, Ahmedabad, India. He holds a master's degree in electrical engineering from Ohio State University.

== Career ==
Joshi joined HP in 1980 as a research and development engineer, he would walk from his apartment to his office. He became vice president in January 2001, became president of the Imaging and Printing Group in February 2001.

After Ann Livermore stepped down as HP's enterprise chief in 2011, Joshi was the last remaining top HP executive to have direct ties to Hewlett-Packard's name-sake founders. Joshi has been described as "a superstar executive."

Joshi also served as chairman of Phogenix Imaging LLC from 2000 until May 2003. Joshi has been a member of the Yahoo! board of directors since 2005. However, he retired from Yahoo's board in February 2012, after serving for 7 years.

In 2005, Fortune magazine published a diversity list, "a list of the most influential African-American, Latino, and Asian-Americans in business, sports, politics, academia, and the arts." Joshi was one of three Indian Americans named.

Joshi's annual compensation in 2010 was $9.1 million, and he owned over $26.5 million of stock options.

On March 21, 2012, it was announced that HP will lump printers and PCs division together and that Joshi would retire, ending a 32-year career with HP. Some sources suggested he was "forced out" by CEO Meg Whitman.

On April 4, 2016, VJ was appointed as CEO and president of 3D Systems, taking lead after Avi Reichental departure by the end of 2015. On May 14, 2020, the 3D Systems board named Jeff Graves as president and CEO, effective May 26.
