= Ajay Patel =

Indian businessman

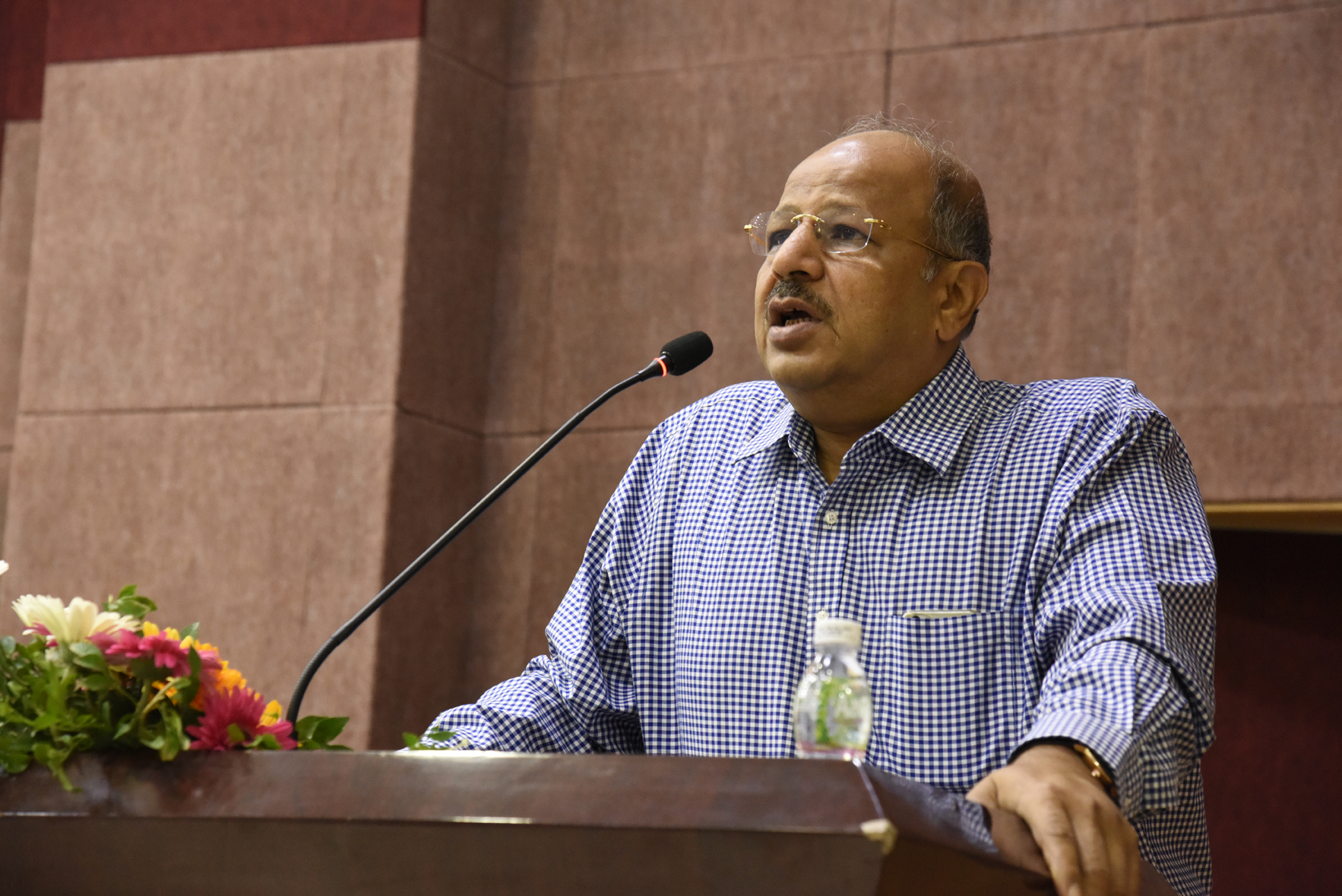

Vice–President of Indian Olympic Association
- Incumbent
- Assumed office 10 December 2022
- Preceded by: Adille Sumariwalla

Personal details
- Born: 9 February 1962 (age 64) Ahmedabad, Gujarat - India
- Spouse: Devangna Patel
- Education: B.E., Civil; L.L.B.
- Alma mater: Diwan Ballubhai School; Lalbhai Dalpatbhai College of Engineering
- Occupation: Banker, businessperson
- Website: ajayhpatel.com

Ajay Patel (born 9 February 1962) is an Indian businessman and sport administrator. He is the chairman of Gujarat State Co-operative Bank and Ahmedabad District Co-Operative Bank (ADC Bank). Patel is also involved in sports associations, primarily as president of Gujarat State Chess Association and vice president of the National Rifle Association. He is considered a close confidant of Amit Shah, who was also past president and director of the ADC Bank.

== Personal life ==
Patel was born on 9 February 1962, in Ahmedabad. Born to a humble family who owned an electrical shop, Patel completed his schooling in Divan-Ballubhai School in 1978 and did his bachelor's degree in Civil engineering from Lalbhai Dalpatbhai College of Engineering. Patel is married to Devangna Patel, and they have 3 children, namely Aneri, Anokhi and Dev.

Ajay Patel with his wife Devangna Patel in 2016

== Career ==
He recently was elected as president to the Gujarat Chambers of Commerce & Industry (GCCI). He is also the owner of Devraj Infrastructure Pvt. Ltd.

As a chairman of ADC Bank, he sponsored the chess training programs in the schools of Gujarat. As a president of Gujarat State Chess Association, he launched Sardar Patel Chess College, first ever chess college in India, which is affiliated under Swarnim Gujarat Sports University.

He was elected unanimously as the chairman of the Co-operative Bank of India (COBI) New Delhi for the next five years. COBI is the apex body of multi-state urban cooperative banks, national co-operative federations, and land development banks.

Patel is currently serving and has served multiple roles in the banking and the sports industry of India as mentioned below:

Organization	Designation	Industry	Period
Co-operative Bank of India	Chairman	Bank	2023 -
Gujarat Chambers of Commerce & Industry (GCCI)	President	Commerce & Industry	2023 -
Indian Olympics Association	Senior Vice President	International Sports	2022 -
Indian Red Cross Society - Gujarat State Branch	Chairman	Social Welfare	2022 -
Asian Zone, All India Chess Association	President	Sports	2022 -
Gujarat Chambers of Commerce & Industry (GCCI)	Senior Vice President	Commerce & Industry	2022 - 2023
All India Chess Association	Former president	Sports	2020 - 2021
Karnavati Club	Member of board of directors	Sports	2016 - 2017
Gujarat State Co-operative Bank	Chairman	Bank	2009 -
Gujarat State Chess Association	President	Sports	2008 -
National Rifle Association	Vice President	Sports	2006 -
Ahmedabad District Co-operative Bank	Chairman	Bank	2003 -

== Awards and honours ==
Patel has won recognition and appreciation awards in 2015 from the National Federation of State Co-operative Banks Limited (NAFSCOB), an apex body of state co-operative banks.

He has also been given the Appreciation Award in Sahakar Bharti 5th National Conference for his active role as Chairman of ADC Bank.

He also has been honoured with the Sahkarita Shiromani Awards for his contributions to the cooperative movement on the occasion of Kribhco's 36th Annual General Meeting.
