= Wushu Association of India =

Governing body of Wushu

- Sport: Wushu
- Abbreviation: WAI

Wushu Association of India is, The Department of Youth Affairs and Sports in the Ministry of Human Resource Development of the Government of India recognises the Wushu Association of India. It is a member of the International Wushu Federation, the Indian Olympic Association, the Wushu Federation of Asia, and the South Asian Wushu Federation.

JITENDRA Singh Bajwa is the president of the association. that the Wushu Association of India is a member of the International Wushu Federation (IWUF), Wushu Federation of Asia (WFA) and South Asian Wushu Federation (SAF). The Wushu Association of India is Recognized by the Ministry of Youth Affairs & Sports, Government of India and Affiliated with an Indian Olympic Association.

In continuation of the above, we want to inform you that we have continuously participated in various championships like the Asian Games, Asian Championship, World Cup, World Games, Asia Cup and Youth Olympic Games in various countries such as the USA, China, Russia, Macau, Vietnam, Batumi, Australia etc.

There are 39 units around India.

== Medals won ==
Competition	Gold	Silver	Bronze	Total
Asian Games	0	2	8	10
Total	0	2	8	10

- updated till 2023

=== List of National Sports award recipients in Wushu, showing the year, award, and gender ===
Year	Recipient	Award	Gender
2011	W. Sandhyarani Devi	Arjuna Award	Female
2012	M. Bimoljit Singh	Arjuna Award	Male
2015	Y. Sanathoi Devi	Arjuna Award	Female
2018	Pooja Kadian	Arjuna Award	Female
2022	Praveen Kumar	Arjuna Award	Male
2020	Kuldeep Handoo	Dronacharya Award	Male
2023	Naorem Roshibina Devi	Arjuna award	female
