= Ball Badminton Federation of India =

National governing body of ball badminton in India

- Sport: Ball badminton
- Jurisdiction: India
- Abbreviation: BBFI
- Founded: 1954
- Headquarters: Mysore, Karnataka
- President: Nawal Kishore Yadav

Official website
- ballbadmintonindia.com
- (India)

The Ball Badminton Federation of India (BBFI) is the governing and controlling body of ball badminton in India. It was established in 1954. The first national ball badminton championship was conducted in Hyderabad, in 1956. Nawal Kishore Yadav serves as the president of BBFI.
