= Sepak takraw in India =

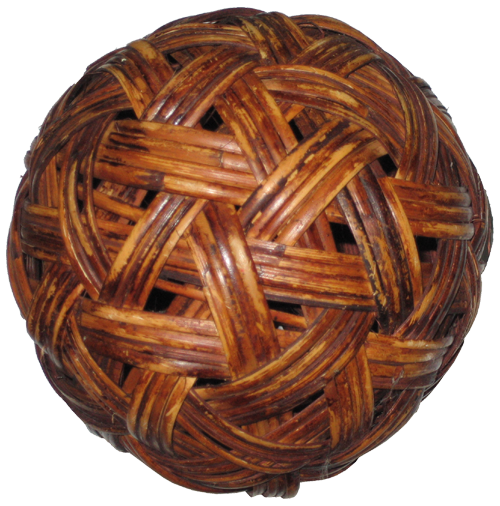
- Sepak takraw ball
- Country: India
- Governing body: Sepaktakraw Federation of India
- National team: India

Sepak takraw is one of the many sports played in India, particularly in the North-Eastern region. Despite not being well known, it was a demonstration sport at the Delhi Asian Games in 1982. The Sepak Takraw Federation with its headquarters in Nagpur, Maharashtra, was founded on 10 September 1982. It is recognised by the Indian Olympic Association and Ministry of Youth Affairs and Sports since 2000. So far, the Federation has conducted 14 Senior, seven Junior, and six Sub-Junior National Championships in different cities and is also conducting Federation Cup Tournament and zonal National Championship.

The game is very popular in the northeastern state of Manipur and some of the best players for the national team hail from the state. The sport has also been growing in popularity in Nagaland. In the 22nd King's Cup International Sepak Takraw Tournament held at Bangkok, the India men's team lost in the semifinals and claimed bronze in the team event. In doubles event, the women's team lost in the semifinals, but won bronze medals.

India won the first medal in Sepak Takraw in Asian Games. India grabbed bronze at the men's team regu Sepak Takraw competition at the 2018 Asian Games held at Ranau Sports Hall, Palembang, Indonesia from 19 to 22 August 2018.

== Medal summary ==
=== Sepak takraw ===
- Total medals won by the Indian national sepak takraw teams in major tournaments (updated as of February 2026):

Competition	Format	Gold	Silver	Bronze	Total
ISTAF World Cup	M	1	1	4	6
ISTAF World Cup	F	0	1	3	4
ISTAF World Cup	X	1	0	1	2
Asian Games	M	0	0	1	1
Asian Games	F	0	0	1	1
ASTAF Asian Cup	M	0	0	3	3
Asian Sepaktakraw Championship	M	1	0	0	0
Total		3	2	13	18

=== Beach Sepak takraw ===
Competition	Format	Gold	Silver	Bronze	Total
Asian Beach Games	M	0	0	1	1
Asian Beach Games	F	0	0	2	2
ASTAF Asian Championship	M	0	0	1	1
ASTAF Asian Championship	F	0	1	0	1
Total		0	1	4	5
