= Lalbhai Dalpatbhai College of Engineering =

Engineering school in India

- Other name: LDCE or L. D. College of Engineering
- Type: State funded college
- Established: 1948; 78 years ago
- Academic affiliations: Gujarat Technological University
- Principal: Dr. Nilay N. Bhuptani
- Undergraduates: 4560 + D2D Students + HRD Students
- Postgraduates: 1460
- Location: Ahmedabad, Gujarat, India; 23°02′06″N 72°32′47″E
- Campus: Urban, 36 acres (15 ha)
- Website: www.ldce.ac.in

Lalbhai Dalpatbhai College of Engineering (LDCE or LD), is a state college located in Ahmedabad, Gujarat, India.

== History ==
The institute was established in 1948 with a donation of Rs. 25 lakhs and 31.2 hectares (77 acres) of land by the textile magnate Kasturbhai Lalbhai, who named the college after his father, Lalbhai Dalpatbhai. The institute started with 75 students in Civil, Mechanical, and Electrical undergraduate programs, and was affiliated to the Bombay University. From 1950 until the formation of the Gujarat Technological University, it was affiliated to the Gujarat University. Currently, Dr. Nilay N Bhuptani is incumbent as the principal of the LD College of Engineering.

== Programs ==
The institute runs 16 undergraduate programs, 14 postgraduate programs, and 4 part time courses (PDDC)

=== UG Programs ===
- Chemical Engineering
- Computer Engineering
- Information and Technology
- Instrumentation and Control
- Electronics and Communication
- Electrical Engineering
- Mechanical Engineering
- Plastic Technology
- Rubber Technology
- Textile Technology
- Bio Medical Engineering
- Automobile Engineering
- Environmental Engineering
- Civil Engineering
- Robotics and Automation
- Artificial Intelligence and Machine Learning

=== Post Graduate ===
- VLSI Design
- Water Resources Management
- Transportation Engineering
- Geotechnical Engineering
- Computer Aided Structural Design
- Environmental Management
- Textile Technology
- CAD/CAM
- Cryogenics Engineering
- Applied Instrumentation
- Communication System
- Computer Aided Process Design
- Electrical Engineering
- Computer Science and Technology
- Information Technology
- IC Engine and Automobiles
- Rubber Technology
- MCA

=== PDDC ===
- Chemical Engineering
- Civil Engineering
- Electrical Engineering
- Mechanical Engineering
- Electronics and Communication Engineering

Degree programs (full-time):

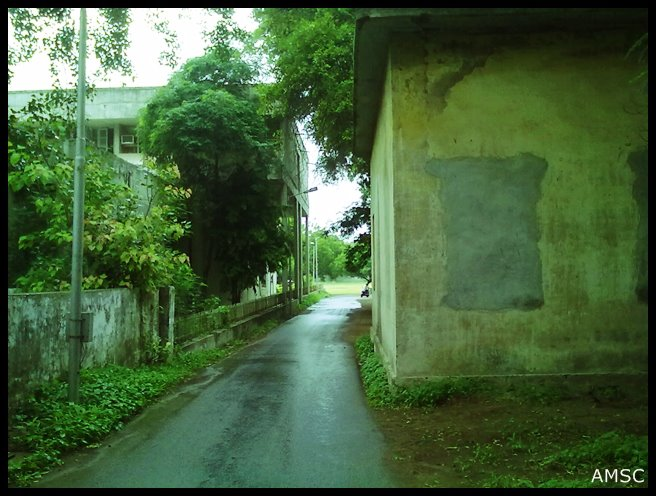
Passage near Annexe building

- Automobile Engineering
- Biomedical Engineering
- Civil Engineering
- Computer Engineering
- Electrical Engineering
- Electronics and Communication Engineering
- Environmental Engineering
- Information Technology
- Instrumentation and Control Engineering
- Mechanical Engineering
- Plastics Engineering
- Rubber technology
- Textile Technology
- Robotics and Automation
- Artificial Intelligence and Machine Learning

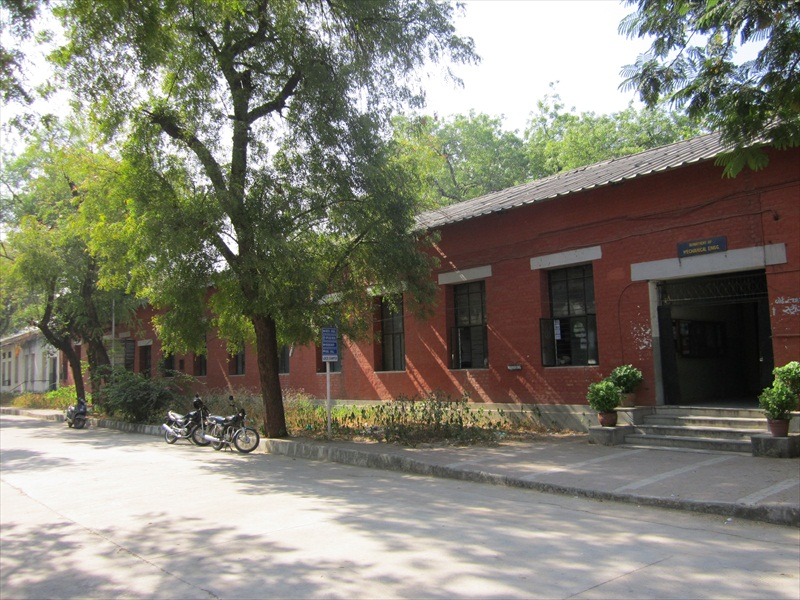
LDCE Building

=== Postgraduate programs (full-time) ===
- Applied Instrumentation
- Automation and Control Power System
- Communication Systems
- Computer Aided Design and Manufacturing
- Computer Aided Process Design
- Computer Aided Structure Analysis and Design
- Computer Science & Technology or Computer Science and Engineering
- Cryogenic Engineering or Cryogenic Engineering
- Environmental Management
- Geotechnical Engineering
- Information Technology
- Internal Combustion Engines and Automobile
- Master of Computer Application or Master of Science in Information Technology
- Rubber Technology
- Textile Engineering
- Transportation Engineering
- VLSI Design
- Water Resources and Management or Water resource management

=== Post Diploma Degree programs (PDDC - B-Tech Part time) ===
- Civil Engineering
- Electrical Engineering
- Electronics and Communication Engineering
- Mechanical Engineering

== Facilities ==
=== Laboratories ===
Each department has laboratories for U.G. and P.G. programs. Most of the laboratories are recognized for testing and standardization by various organizations. New laboratories of the institute are constantly being established in emerging areas. In addition to the students, the laboratories also cater to industrial testing in diverse fields.

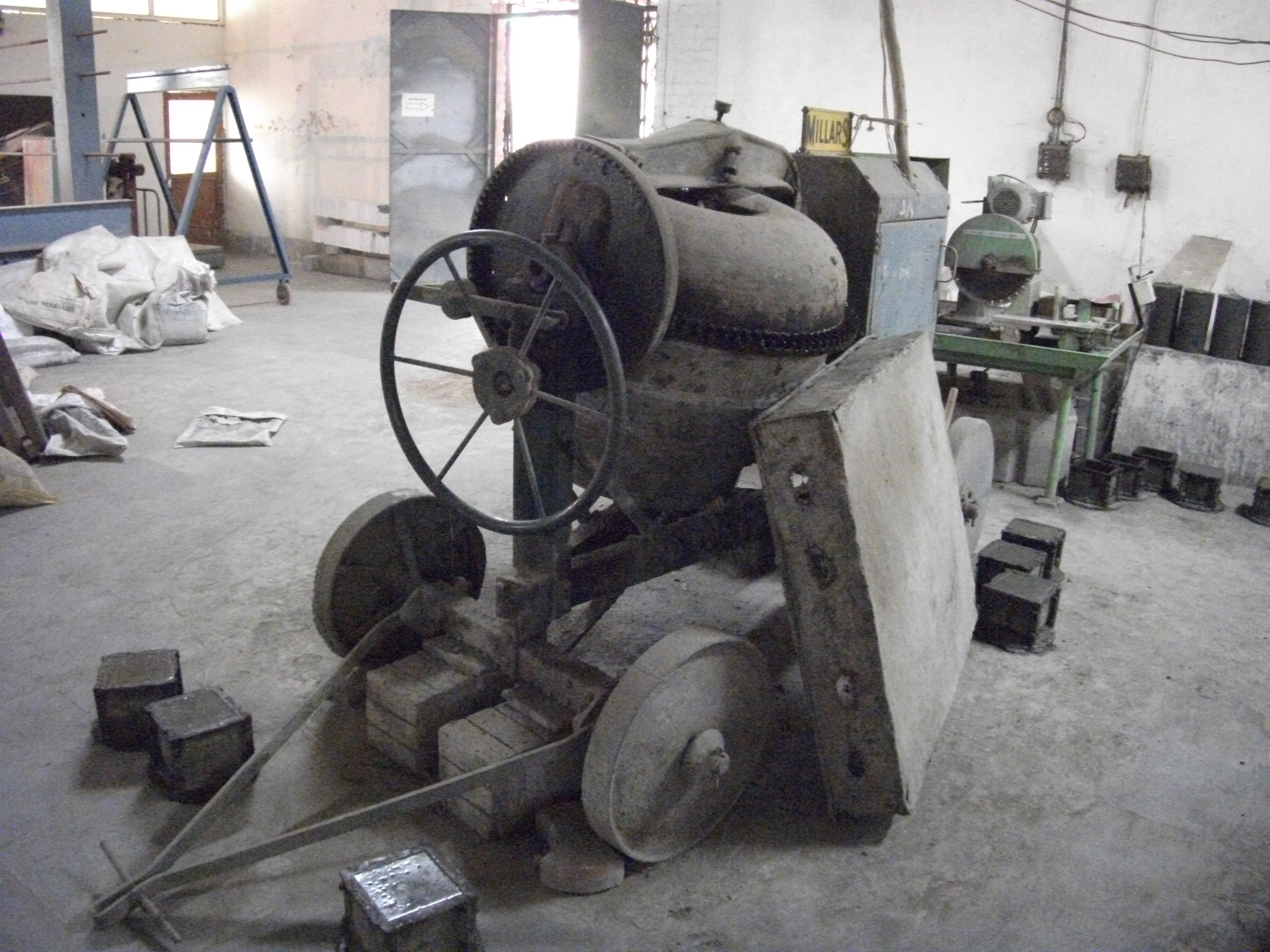
Heavy Structures Laboratory

=== Workshop ===
The workshop is equipped to show students the basic operations of manufacturing and production. It is equipped with a CNC machine, an electro-discharge machine, and measuring instruments. The institute has a thermal workshop in which boilers and other thermal equipment can be studied and an automobile workshop.

Centre of Excellence - Siemens has been established at L. D. College of Engineering. Centre of Excellence has established relevant laboratories having Siemens products and Siemens Industry software applications.

Keepsake Welding Research & Skill development Centre of Excellence has been established at L. D. College of Engineering.

=== Sports ===
The college has dedicated a team for major sports like cricket, lawn and table tennis, badminton, kabbadi, football, volleyball etc. College also has its own ground for cricket, football, lawn tennis court and an indoor badminton court. Every year, hundreds of students take part in GTU Sports fest, which is university level sports fest of Gujarat and bring laurels to the college.

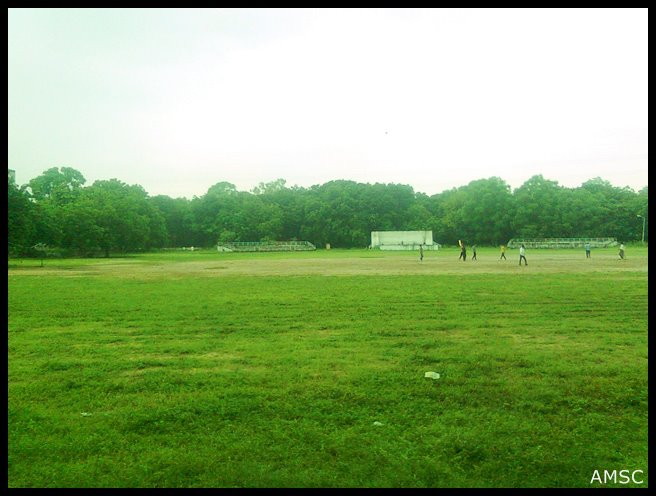
Cricket ground

=== Library ===
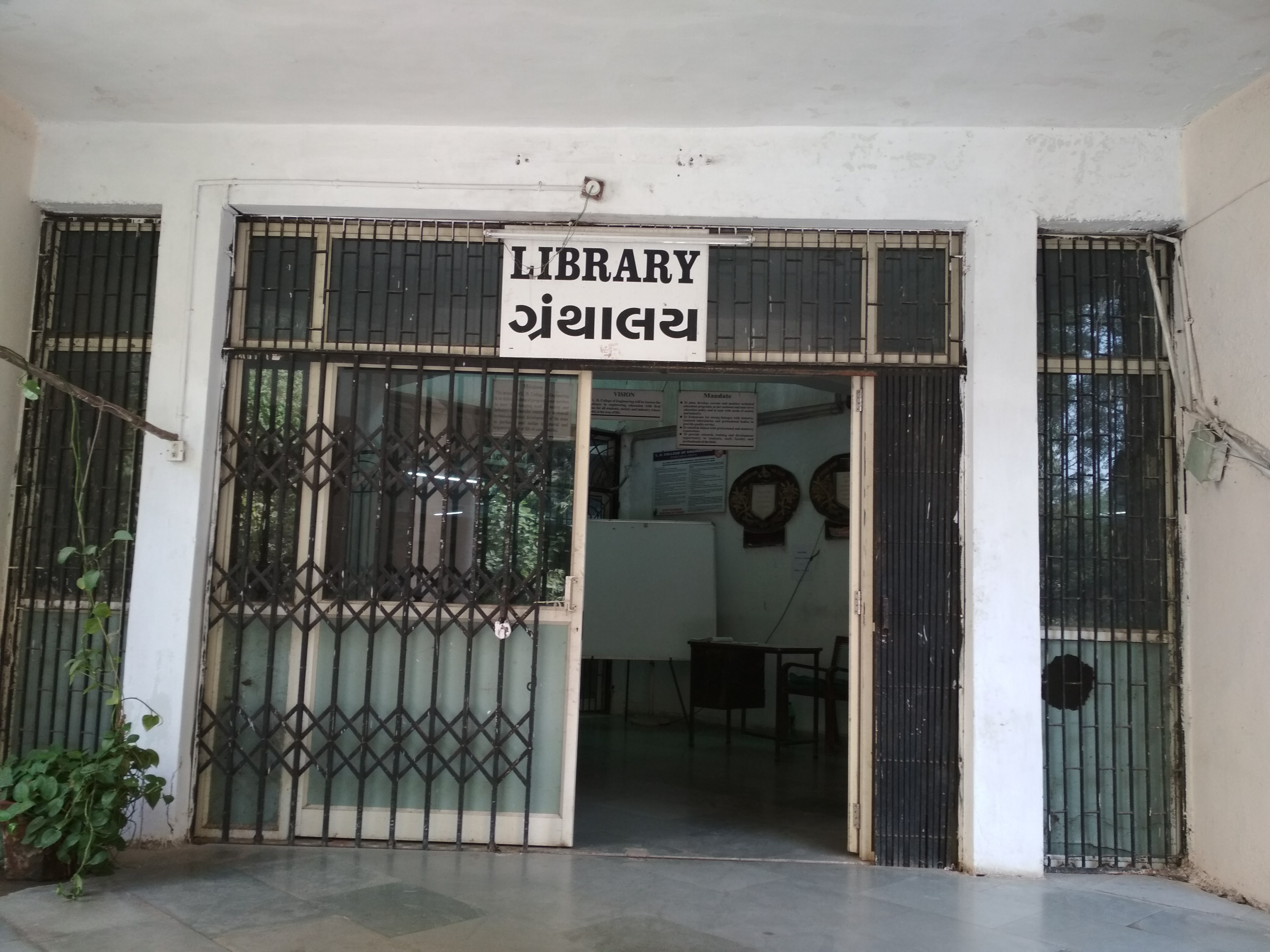
Library for college students.

The library has 1,03,000 technical books, 173 periodicals, reference books, handbooks, encyclopedias and Indian standards. The library has computerized book search facility.

=== Training and placement cell ===
The institute maintains a training and placement cell to help students prepare for job searches. Assistance is given to students in developing interviewing skills. Major industries conduct campus interviews for final year students, and thus some students get their job offers through the cell.

=== Hostel ===
The institute has hostel facilities for 787 students. There are two messes in the hostel campus, which are managed by the students. Newspapers and magazines are subscribed for the hostel library. Entertainment facilities include TV room, badminton room, and gymnasium, and outdoor and indoor games. The hostel is administered by the rector and four wardens.

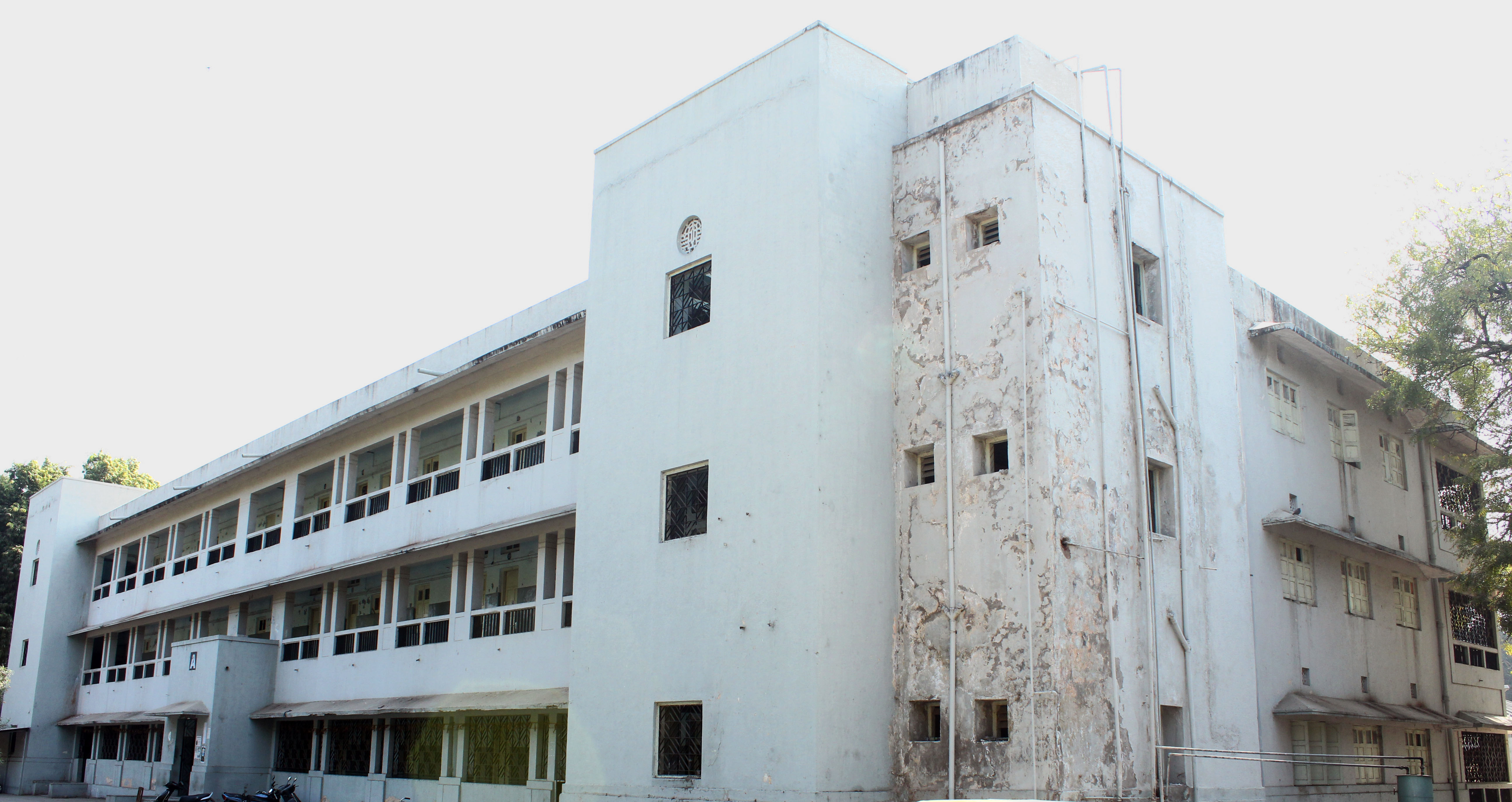
Hostel Building 'A' - L.D.C.E

=== Canteen ===
The canteen is located at the center of the campus. This facility is available for the students and staff at reasonable rates.

== Clubs ==
LD college of engineering also has different clubs including:

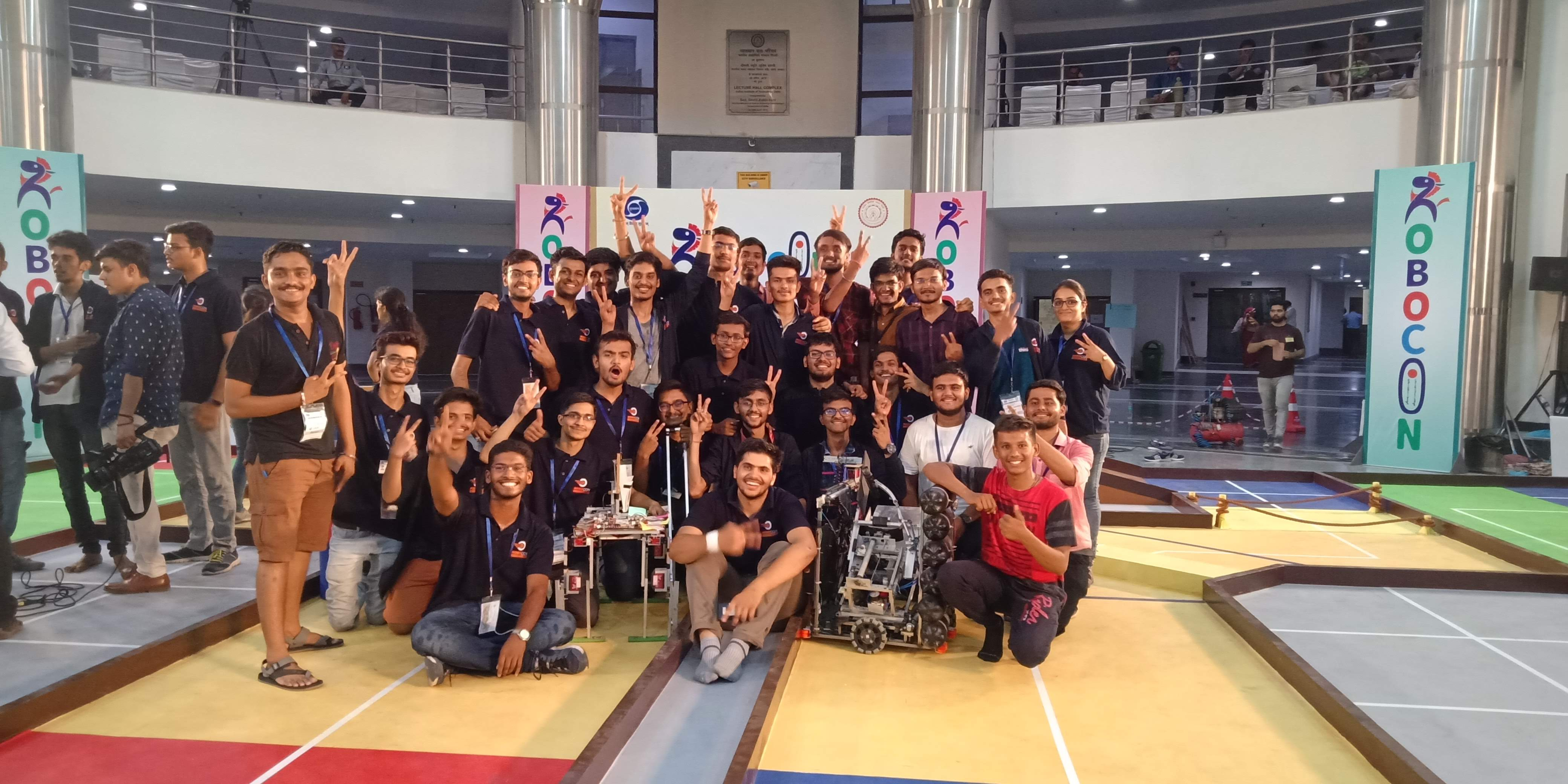
Team Robocon LDCE, at IIT Delhi, Robocon India 2019

- Dhanak - The Cultural Club
- Elite Sports Club - The Sports Club of LDCE
- YellowSide-The Entrepreneurship Club of LDCE
- Rotaract Club Of LDCE
- Advanature
- FOSS Programming Club
- Innovators Club
- IEEE
- Mind Palace
- SAE India Collegiate Club
- Team Robocon LDCE
- Vox Populi
- PRAKALPA

=== Team Robocon LDCE ===
Team Robocon LDCE
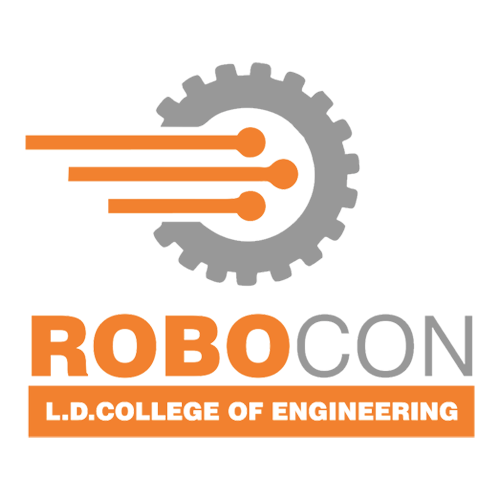
- Founded: 2004
- Based in: Ahmedabad
- Owner: L. D. College of Engineering
- Head coach: M. M. Makwana
- Championships: 2019
- Website: ldce.ac.in

The team takes part in an annual robotics competition named Robocon India, which is the national level competition of ABU Robocon. The team mainly comprises the students from Mechanical, Electronics and communication, Computer Science and Instrumentation and control fields.

In Robocon India 2019, the Team Robocon LDCE won the national championship and represented India in the international event of ABU Robocon 2019 held at Ulaanbaatar, Mongolia.

In Robocon India 2018, the team have reached the quarter-finals and won the Best idea award.

The team also organize an annual techno-cultural fest Lakshya in the month of February. In Lakshya Fest 2019 about 9,000 students participated in different events.

== Alumni ==
- Shiladitya Bora, film producer
- Vyomesh Joshi, CEO of 3D Systems
- Ajay Patel, Chairman of Gujarat State Co-operative Bank and Ahmedabad District Co-Operative Bank
