= Roller Skating Federation of India =

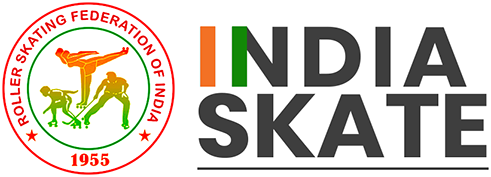
- Sport: Roller Sports
- Category: SKATES
- Jurisdiction: India
- Membership: 30 State/UT associations
- Abbreviation: RSFI
- Founded: 1965; 61 years ago
- Affiliation: World Skate
- Affiliation date: 1971
- Regional affiliation: Confederation of Asian Roller Sports (CARS)
- Affiliation date: 1978
- Headquarters: Chandigarh, Punjab and Haryana
- President: Tulsi Ram Agarwal
- Secretary: Dr Bhagirath Kumar Dadhich

Official website
- www.worldskateindia.com
- (India)

The Roller Skating Federation of India (RSFI) is the national governing body for roller sports in India. The RSFI was established in 1955 and has been affiliated with the Fédération Internationale de Roller Sports (now World Skate) since 1971. The RSFI was a founder member of the Confederation Asian Roller Sports (CARS) in 1978. The Federation was officially recognized by the Union Ministry of Youth Affairs and Sports in September 1990, and was subsequently recognized by the Indian Olympic Association.

The RSFI holds the annual National Roller Sports Championships for males and females. Effective 1 January 2025, the Roller Skating Federation of India (RSFI) revised its age-group classifications for athlete registration and competitions. The updated categories include: Tots: 6–8 years, Minis: 8–10 years, Cadet: 10–12 years, Sub-Junior: 12–15 years, Junior: 15–18 years, Senior: 18 years and above, Masters: 35 years and above in the disciplines of artistic skating, speed skating, inline freestyle, roller freestyle, roller hockey, inline hockey, inline downhill, inline alpine, skateboarding and roller derby.

Nineteen state and union territory associations are affiliated with the RSFI.

In July 2017, the RSFI announced that it was planning to introduce a professional roller sports league along the lines of the Indian Premier League, Pro Kabaddi, and the Pro Wrestling League.

== See also ==
- Roller sport in India
- India national roller hockey team
