= Ball badminton =

Badminton variation

Ball Badminton, 2012

Ball badminton is a sport native to India. It is a racket sport game, played with a yellow ball made of wool, on a court of fixed dimensions (12 by 24 metres) divided by a net. The game was played as early as 1856 by the royal family in Tanjore, the capital of Thanjavur district in Tamil Nadu, India. It enjoys the greatest popularity in India. Ball badminton is a fast-paced game; it demands skill, quick reflexes, good judgment, agility, and the ability to control the ball with one's wrist.

Games are usually played outdoors during the day. As a result, weather conditions wield a considerable influence, and ball badminton's rules allow the effects of weather conditions to be distributed more-or-less evenly between both teams. More recently, indoor versions of the game have been played under artificial lighting. All-India tournaments are conducted regularly using floodlights in Tamil Nadu, Puducherry, Andhra Pradesh, Telangana and Karnataka. Ball Badminton sport is managed by "Ball Badminton Federation of India". Ball badminton is now an officially recognised game in India. Total 34 units are affiliated to "Ball badminton federation of India " in which 26 are States units including Bihar, jharkhand, Nagaland etc. 5 Public sector units and 3 provisional affiliated units.

== History ==
Ball badminton originated in Tanjore, in Tamil Nadu. It became popular, commanding the interest of the Maharaja of Tanjore. The game has attracted many players from southern India.

Previously, ball badminton was an attractive game for rural boys since it required a minimum of equipment. The game drew a large number of students from South India, resulting in the formation of the Ball Badminton Federation of India in 1954. The BBF was among the first three sports federations—along with the Indian Athletic Federation and the Indian Hockey Federation—to form the Indian Olympic Association in 1961. Ball badminton eventually spread to Andhra Pradesh, and the first national championship was conducted at Hyderabad in 1956. It was later introduced at the junior and sub-junior levels.

Types of incumbent The ball is yellow wool, from 27 to 30 grams in weight and from 5 to 5.5 cm in diameter. A standard ball-badminton racket usually weighs from 165 to 185 grams and is 63 to 70 cm in length. The strung oval area of the racket should be 20 to 22 across and 24 to 27 cm in length. The net is made of fine cord to make a 2 cm square mesh along its length and is edged with red tape at the top. The entire net is red, white and blue, 100 cm wide and 13.5 metres in length. It is tied to a centre pole of 183 cm and two poles of 185 cm at the sides of the court to maintain the 183 cm height of the net at the centre. Two posts, each 180 cm high, are fixed one metre outside the court on either side at the end of the line to which the net is tied, strong enough to keep the net well stretched. A hook is fixed at 1.5 metres height to each pole to easily tighten the net whenever necessary. The size of the court for "fives" teams is 12 metres wide and 24 metres long. It is divided across the middle by a net line over which the net is hung, the ends of which are attached to the tops of the two posts. The serving crease lines are drawn one metre away from each side of the net line and parallel to it. The centre line is drawn halfway between the serving crease lines and parallel to the sidelines; this divides the space on each side of the crease line into two-halves, known as the right and left courts. The boundary lines are marked with white tape, 10 mm thick. The centre and crease lines are to be marked so as to be visible, about 10 mm wide

== Rules ==
Ball badminton is a team sport. The ball is served (hit from the right or left court of one side to the diagonally opposite court of the other side). The server begins on the right court and moves to the left court each time a point is scored. The ball may be returned by any opposing player. After the 9th, 18th, and 27th point the teams change positions, with the server continuing to alternate between the right and left courts. The ball is served underhand below the waist, then it must go over the net and beyond the serving crease line on the other side. An overhand service—if the ball is above the server's waist when it is struck—is a fault. The ball must be returned before it touches the ground, and no player may strike the ball twice in succession. The server must not serve until the other side is ready; ordinarily, the players of the receiving side are expected to be ready. During the game the player must not leave the court except in the act of playing, if he has an accident, or with the referee's permission for activities such as changing a racket, tying a shoelace, or tightening a belt. The referee normally grants a player's request for such activities, unless the ball is in play; however, he has the final right to refuse if he deems such activities delaying tactics. In "fives" tournaments, a team consists of ten formally designated players, any five of whom play while the other five remain on the sidelines with the team manager, ready to play. Doubles tournaments use teams of three players. During a match of two or three games, three player substitutions are allowed. Substitutions may be made at any time during the game. The ball may not be changed during a three-game match set, unless it is damaged.

=== Faults ===
If a fault is made by the serving team, the serving player shall be replaced by a teammate. If all five players on a team commit a serving fault, the serve goes to the receiving team. If a fault is made by the receiving team, the serving team is awarded a point and continues to serve. It is a fault if:

- The server is not stationary (both feet on the ground) while serving
- The server misses his stroke
- The ball is served overhand (hits the racket above the server's waist)
- Service is delivered from the wrong court (right instead of left, or vice versa)
- The ball touches the ground before it is returned
- The ball served drops into the wrong court or on a line (center, serving crease, side or boundary)
- A player serves out of turn (before the previous server is out)
- Any part of the server's body or racket crosses any of the lines when serving (even a foot on line is out of court)
- A "double touch" is made (a player, while making a stroke, hits the ball more than once)
- A "tip" is made (the ball is touched by two rackets of the same team in succession)
- A "clash" is made (the rackets of two or more players clash in playing the ball before, during, or after striking the ball)
- A player—or his racket—crosses the net line during the course of play (i.e. during a rally)
- The ball is sent out of bounds (a player is free to hit a ball going out of bounds back in, but if he misses it he commits a fault)
- The ball touches a player or his uniform, whether inside or outside the court
- A player's racket, in the act of striking, crosses or touches the net
- The ball fails to clear the net either in service or return
- The ball touches the top of the net
- The served ball falls on any line (a ball in rally, however, is faulted only if it fails on the boundary line; it can fall on the center or crease lines)
- The ball is bounced on the ground after the server is warned by the umpire to play
- Delay in serving is caused by passing the ball from one player to another after the umpire has requested play to begin

=== Match play ===
A match consists of three games. The team that wins two out of three games is the match winner. The team first scoring the 34th point wins a game. Teams start each game from the side opposite the one they played the previous game. There is a break of two minutes between the end of the first game and the start of the second game, and five minutes between the second and the third games. Choice of side and the right of first service is decided by a coin toss at the beginning of a match. If the team winning the toss chooses to serve, the other team has the choice of side and vice versa. At the beginning of a match the referee allows two trials, one from each side. After the trials are over, the umpire shall call "play" and regular play begins. A ball is in play from the time a player attempts to serve until it touches the ground or until a "fault" or "let" (a re-serve) is called by the umpire.

The officiating team consists of one umpire, two or more line referees and a scorer. When the umpire calls "play", if a team refuses to play it forfeits the match. The umpire is the sole judge on the fairness of a play, weather and lighting conditions. His decisions are final. It is the umpire's responsibility to call "fault" or "let", with (or without) an appeal from the players. If an umpire erroneously calls "fault" and immediately corrects himself and calls "play" but the striker fails to return the ball, a "let" is allowed. Umpires serve for an entire match, unless a change is authorized by the tournament committee. Each of the two (or more) line referees is responsible for one boundary line and one half of the side line opposite the umpire, in addition to any other duties assigned by the umpire. Referees signal the umpire in a code prescribed by the BBF. The scorer records the points scored and the number of hands on the score sheet. A ball may be replaced by an umpire if it is lost or damaged. The umpire can overrule a line referee's decision, if he feels that an error has been committed.

The umpire is also responsible for the net. He announces the score (for the benefit of the scorer) when a point is scored or a server is out. In announcing the score he calls the number of the serving hand, followed by the score of the serving team and the score of the other team. If a match is suspended by the umpire for any reason (e.g. weather and light), it is resumed from the point at which it was stopped. In case of a tie between two or more teams in any tournament, a match is not replayed. If the tie is unbroken, teams are ranked based on game and point scores. In a league tournament, if two (or more) teams have identical won/lost records their game scores are used to break the tie.

Game Scoring

The number of games won and lost by each team in each league match is recorded. Keeping in mind that each match is played as a best of three games, a team winning a match after three games has won two games and lost one. If a team wins a match in two straight games, its official won/lost record is 3–0. The losing team in each case has a record of 1–2 and 0–3, respectively. The difference between the number of games won and lost is a team's game score. The team with the highest game score is the winner in the event of a tie; if two or more teams have the same game score, their point scores will also break the tie.

Point Score

Points scored in each game by each team in all league matches are recorded. A team winning a match in two straight games, after recording the points scored for and against in the two games played also receives 35 points in favour and zero points against for the third (unplayed) game. Correspondingly, zero points in favour and 35 points against are recorded for the losing team. The difference between total points in favour and against in all the matches is a team's point score. The team scoring the most net points (for minus against) is the winner.

=== Discipline ===
The umpire can warn a player if the player behaves on-court in a manner bringing discredit to the referee, other players or the officials, or otherwise lowering the image of the game. A second warning triggers a yellow card. A third warning triggers a red card and ejection from the game; following a red card, the player's team continues with four players. A team manager substitute for a player shown a yellow card, if a sufficient number of substitutions remain.

=== Umpire duties ===
- Since the umpire is the most important official, he should be well-versed in the rules of ball badminton
- Before the play begins, he makes necessary entries on the score sheet and hands it to the scorer for use and obtaining signatures of each team captain when the match ends
- Check net height and other ground arrangements
- Instructs line referees and scorer
- Instructs both the terms on discipline, major rules and recent rule changes
- Carefully consider his decisions, since his judgments are final; a player may only appeal based on a rule
- A line referee's decision is final in all judgment calls on his own line; the umpire does not ordinarily overrule him. If a line referee's vision is blocked, the umpire may make the call if he can; otherwise a 'let' should be given
- If a decision is impossible, the umpire gives a 'let'. He should not consult the players or spectators
- The umpire is responsible for all lines not covered by line referees
- When the umpire is uncertain whether there has been an infringement of a rule, 'fault' should not be called. A 'let' should be given
- The umpire should remember the game is for players, and keeps play in progress without unnecessary interruption
- In summation, the umpire should control the game firmly

== See also ==
- Racquet sport
