= Pankaj Gupta (sports administrator) =

Indian sports administrator and football manager (1899–1971)

- Born: 1899; Dhaka, Bengal Presidency, British India
- Died: 6 March 1971 (aged 71–72)
- Occupations: sports administrator and journalist

5th President of All India Football Federation
- In office 1950–1960
- Preceded by: Moin-ul-Haq
- Succeeded by: Manindra Nath Dutta Ray

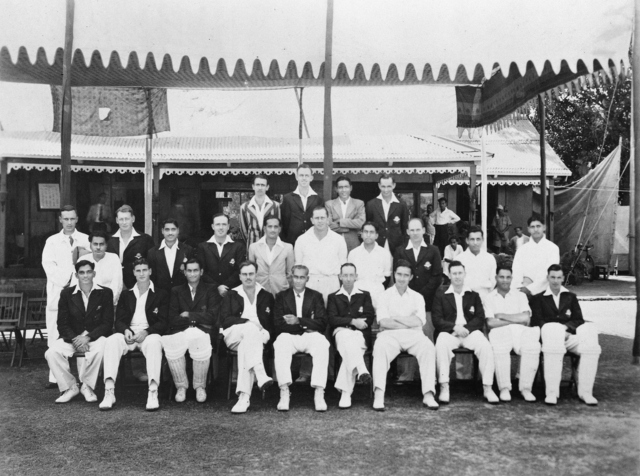
second row: Dubree Carey, P. Gupta, Flight Lieutenant A.W. Roper RAAF, B.B. Nimbalkar, Sergeant Charles F.T. Price AIF, T.V. Parthasarathy, Sergeant Cecil G. Pepper AIF, C.T. Sarwate, Flying Officer E.A. Williams RAAF, J.N. Bhaya, M. Banerjee

Pankaj Kumar Gupta MBE (1899 – 6 March 1971) was one of the earliest Indian sports administrators involved in professional football, hockey and cricket. He is best known for his involvement in professional hockey where he worked variously as a manager, administrator, and referee. His contributions earned him the nickname "Mr. Hockey". He also became the first head coach of the India national football team in 1938, and guided the team in the Indian tour of Australia.

== Formative years ==
Gupta was born in Magar Union, Dhaka in 1899. He studied Intermediate Arts at Sanskrit College and graduated from Bangabasi College of the University of Calcutta. He made an entry into the administration of the Indian Football Association, as a representative of Sporting Union club. In 1924, he was manager of the IFA team that went on a tour to Java, then part of Dutch East Indies and presently Indonesia.

Starting with Los Angeles Olympic Games in 1932, he was manager or coach of the Indian team or contingent to many sports events in Europe and America. He attended the World Football Congress twice as the Indian delegate, was manager of the Indian football team to Russia and of the Indian cricket team visiting England in 1946 and 1952, and Australia in 1947–48. He toured Australia, New Zealand, and many countries of Europe and America with the Indian hockey team.

== Link with Dhyan Chand ==
Pankaj Gupta was the first coach of Dhyan Chand. The latter's actual name was Dhyan Singh. Gupta gave him the title of "Chand" or moon, and predicted that one day he would shine like a moon. So close were the two that when Jhansi Heroes went to Kolkata to participate in Beighton Cup, all the players put up in hotel, but Dhyan Chand stayed with Gupta. Dhyan Chand has narrated many stories about Gupta. Here is one about their drive through the Dutch countryside: "Pankaj Gupta took us for a drive through a small narrow village which lay on our way to Doorn. We saw Dutch women lining up the streets peddling fresh fish caught from the dykes. The Bengali that he was, Pankaj Gupta remarked that the sight reminded him very much of the villages in Bengal. These Dutch women in their colourful costumes and wooden shoes presented a typical rural Dutch scene."

== Sports administration ==
Gupta was the Secretary of the Bengal Hockey Association for more than a decade continuously from 1936. He held official positions in Indian Football Association and was active in founding the All India Football Federation. He was Honorary Treasurer of the organisation in its year of inception and was president subsequently. He was instrumental in the founding of the National Cricket Club and the construction of the stadium at Eden Gardens. In the 1944 New Year Honours list, the British government appointed him a Member of the Order of the British Empire (MBE) in recognition of his contribution to sports administration.

Gupta was also associated with Wari Club and Dhaka D.S.A.

== See also ==
- History of the India national football team
- List of India national football team managers
