= Indian Triathlon Federation =

National governing body of triathlon in India

- Sport: Triathlon
- Jurisdiction: India
- Abbreviation: ITP
- Founded: 8 May 1990
- Affiliation: World Triathlon
- Regional affiliation: Asian Triathlon
- Headquarters: Chennai, India
- President: T.S. Krishnaswamy

Official website
- triathlonindia.com
- (India)

The Indian Triathlon Federation (ITF) is the governing and controlling body of triathlon in India. It was registered on 8 May 1990, under the Tamil Nadu Societies Registration Act, 1975. It is affiliated to World Triathlon and Asian Triathlon. T.S. Krishnaswamy serves as the president of ITF. The first paratriathlon national championship was held in May 2023 in Chennai.
