= Tenpin Bowling Federation (India) =

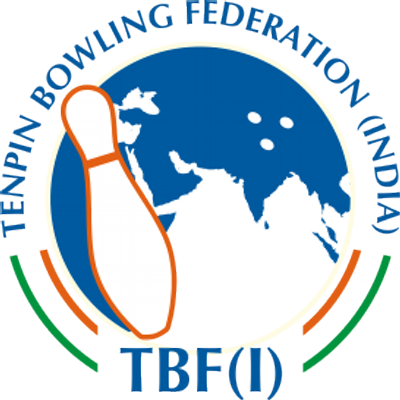
- Sport: Ten-pin bowling
- Jurisdiction: India
- Abbreviation: TBFI
- Founded: 1975; 50 years ago
- Affiliation: World Bowling
- Regional affiliation: Asian Bowling Federation
- Headquarters: 572, 16th B Main, 3rd Block, Koramangala, Bangalore, Karnataka
- President: Ajay Singh
- Secretary: Vijay Krishna Dasari

Official website
- www.tbfi.org.in
- (India)

The Tenpin Bowling Federation (India), abbreviated to TBFI, is the national sports federation for ten-pin bowling in India. Legally, it is a non-profit association registered under the Societies Registration Act, 1860. The Bowling Federation of India was founded in 1975. The organization was renamed to the Tenpin Bowling Federation (India) in 2007.

The TBFI was recognized by the Ministry of Youth Affairs and Sports on 16 January 1998.

TBFI is affiliated to the Asian Bowling Federation and World Bowling. It is also affiliated to the World Tenpin Bowling Association and to the Commonwealth Tenpin Bowling Federation.
