= Modern Pentathlon Federation of India =

Sports governing body in India

- Sport: Modern pentathlon
- Jurisdiction: India
- Membership: 12 associations
- Abbreviation: MPFI
- Founded: 2009; 17 years ago
- Affiliation: Union Internationale de Pentathlon Moderne
- Regional affiliation: Asian Modern Pentathlon Confederation
- Headquarters: A/61, Sector No-3, Airoli, Navi Mumbai, Maharashtra
- President: Sunil Purnapatre
- Secretary: Namdev Shirgaonkar

Official website
- pentathlonindia.org
- (India)

The Modern Pentathlon Federation of India (MPFI) is the national governing body for the Olympic sport of modern pentathlon. The MPFI was founded in 2009 by former kabaddi player Namdev Shirgaonkar. The MPFI was recognized by the Indian Olympic Association (IOA) in 2012. It is affiliated to the Asian Modern Pentathlon Confederation (APMC) of the Union Internationale de Pentathlon Moderne (UIPM).

== History ==
The MPFI signed an MoU with the Egyptian Modern Pentathlon Federation (EMPF) on 27 September 2016 at Karnal, Haryana. The MoU facilitates sharing and developing technical and IT support facilities between the two bodies, and exchange programme for athletes and coaches of the two countries. The MPFI general secretary Shirgaonkar was elected as the general secretary of the APMC on 19 October 2016.

== Championships ==
The MPFI held the 4th Modern Pentathlon National Championship in Goa in September 2013. The 8th Modern Pentathlon National Championship was held in Pune in August 2017.
