= Moin-ul-Haq =

Indian sports administrator

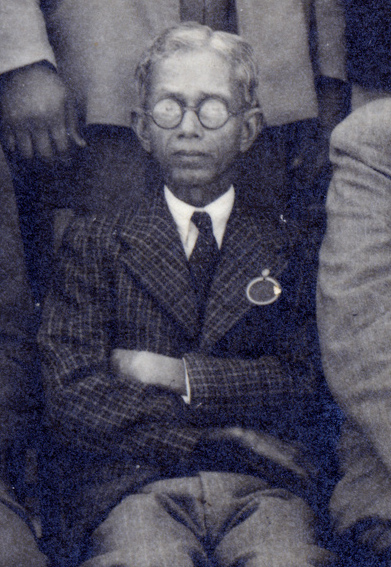
- Syed Muhammad Moin-ul-Haq is seated in the last row 6th from the left and fourth from the right at the Indian Olympic Association Managing Committee, 1942

4th President of All India Football Federation
- In office 1948–1950
- Preceded by: D. Moir
- Succeeded by: Pankaj Gupta (sports administrator)

Personal details
- Born: Syed Muhammad Moin-ul-Haq; 1881 Nalanda district, Bengal Presidency, British India (now Asthawan, Nalanda district, Bihar)
- Died: 1970 (aged 88–89) Patna
- Occupation: Professor of English

Syed Muhammad Moin-ul-Haq OBE (popularly known as Moin Saab; 1881 – 11 December 1973) was an Indian Academic and Sports Administrator who had been Professor of English and Principal of Bihar National College from 1935 to 1953. He has been the first President of All India Football Federation and a recipient of the Padma Shri in 1970.

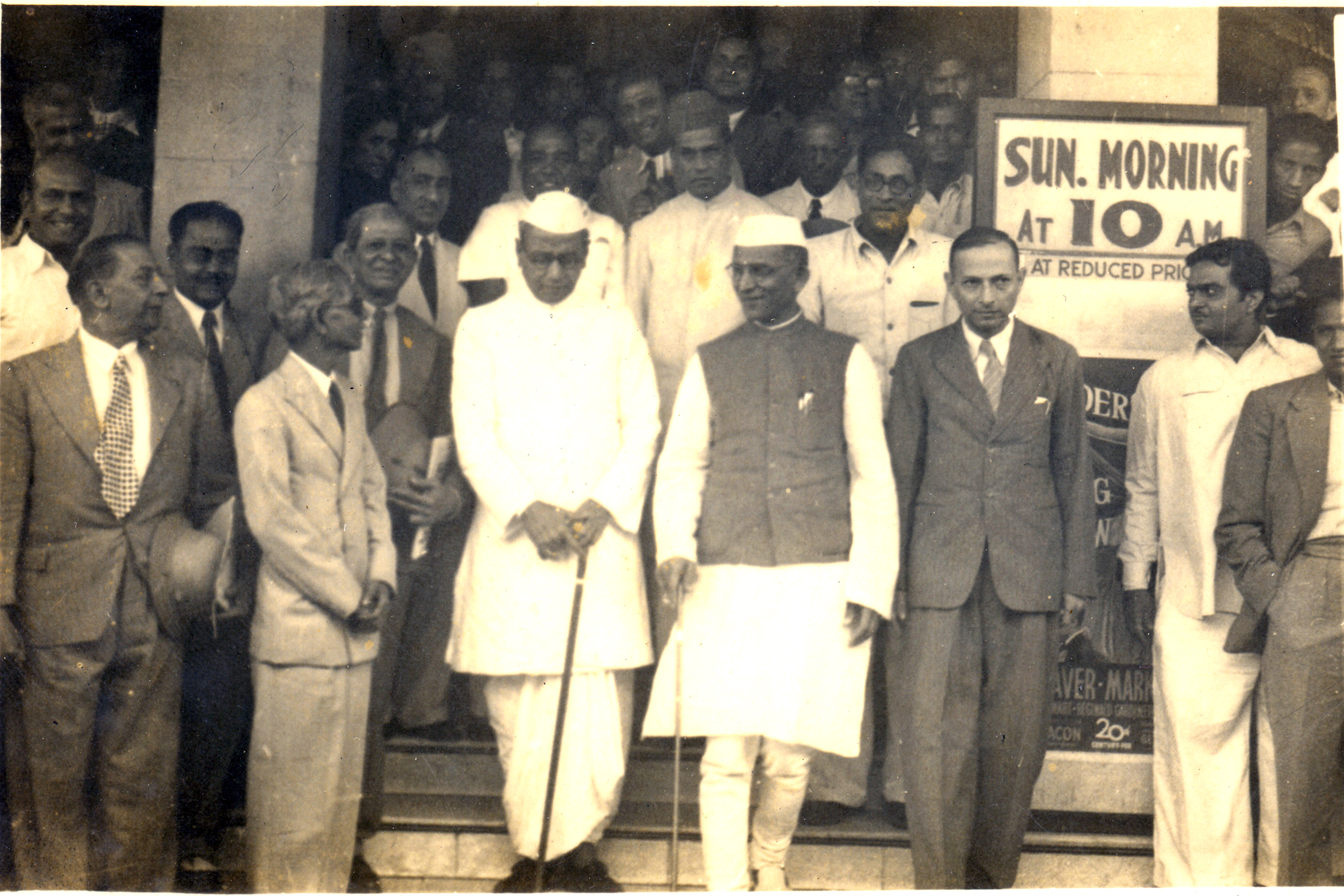
Indian National Games 1950: Moinul Haq, S. Bhoot, Bombay Chief Minister Kher (center with cane), and Bombay Home Minister Morarji Desai (center)

== Early life ==
Moin-ul-Haq was born as Syed Muhammad Moin-ul-Haq at Asthawan in the Nalanda district of Bihar in 1881.

== Sports ==
He has been crediting for organizing and starting the Inter-University Football Cup Competition in 1929 at Patna College.

He was elected as the President of the Patna University Teacher’s Association in 1953 following the formation of Babasaheb Bhimrao Ambedkar Bihar University, Muzaffarpur in 1952, a conference was organized at the Tilka Manjhi Bhagalpur University, Bhagalpur where he was elected as the President.

He was elected as the Founding Vice-president of the Bihar Cricket Association with KAD Naraoji, the founding president. It was established after a meeting held in Jamshedpur.

He was a Chef-de-mission of the Indian Olympic contingent during the 1948 Olympics held in London and the 1952 Olympics held in Helsinki.

== Accolades ==
- The British government appointed an Officer of the Order of the British Empire (OBE) in the 1930 Birthday Honours.
- He was awarded the Padma Shri in the field of sports in 1970 by the Government of India.

== Legacy ==
- Abdul Ghafoor, then Chief Minister of Bihar issued the order to rename Rajendra Prasad Stadium in tribute to Moin Saab, and it was later renamed as Moin-ul-Haq Stadium in 1973.
- Moin-ul-Haq Stadium metro station, a Metro station near the Moin-ul-Haq Stadium.
- Author and Retired IPS Sudhir Kumar Jha mentions Moin-ul-Haq in his book Patna Reincarnated: A New Dawn and writes:
  He was immensely impressed with the strong nation character of the British people and their resilience.
