= Saltoro Valley =

Valley in Gilgit-Baltistan, Pakistan

Saltoro Valley وادیِ سلترو
- Union Council
- The green valley of Saltoro surrounded by the Siachen Glaciers

- Location within Gilgit Baltistan Location within Pakistan
- Coordinates: 35.143°N 76.746°E
- Country: Pakistan
- State: Gilgit-Baltistan
- District: Ghanche
- Tehsil: Masherbrum
- Time zone: UTC+5:00 (PST)

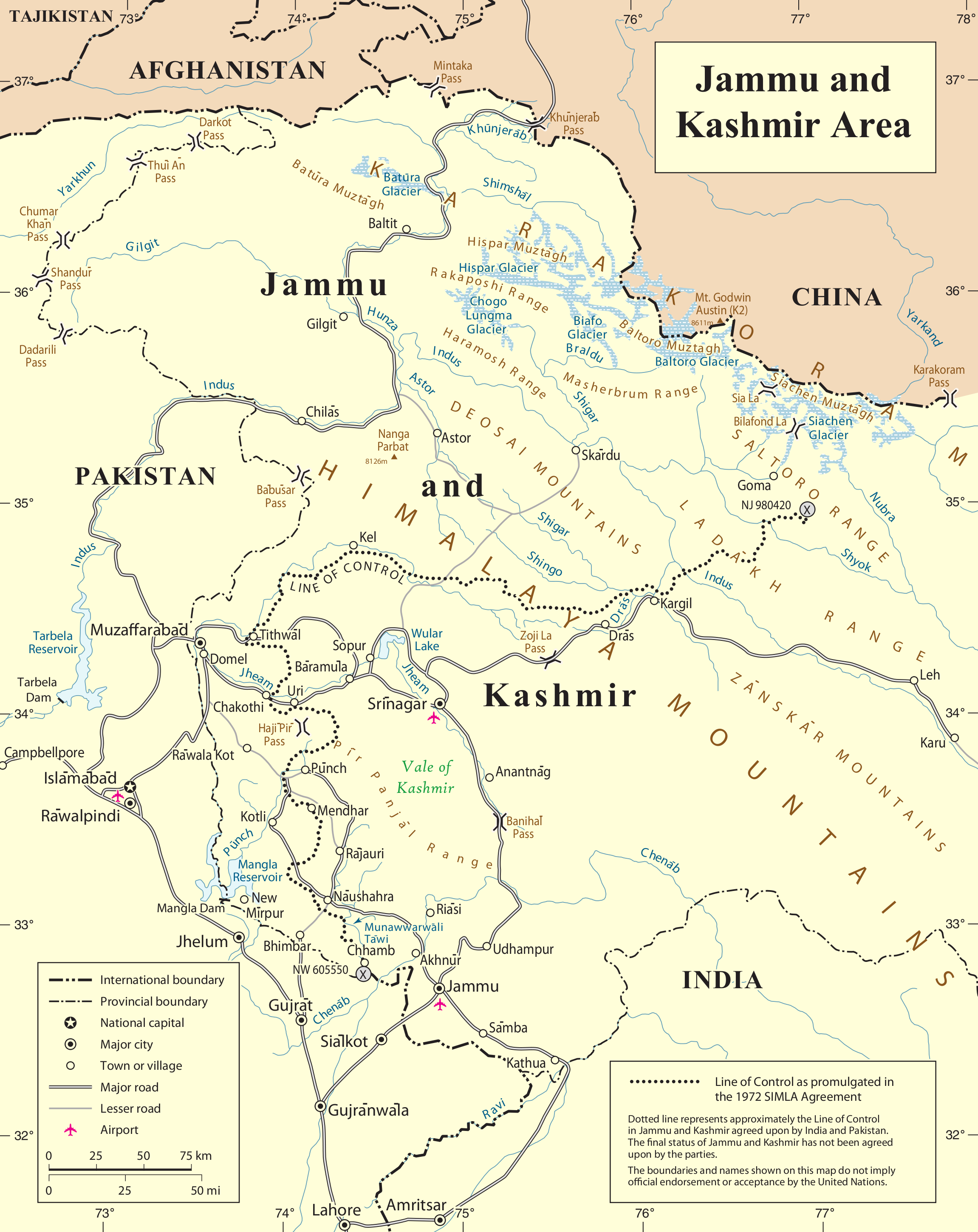
United Nations map of Siachen Glacier showing "Point NJ980420" (Point NJ9842) as the starting point of the "Actual Ground Position Line" (AGPL), Goma military camp of Pakistan, Nubra River valley and Siachen glaciers held by India, and Bilafond La and Sia La also held by India. Masherbrum Range, Baltoro Glacier, Baltoro Glacier, Baltoro Muztagh and K2 are held by Pakistan.

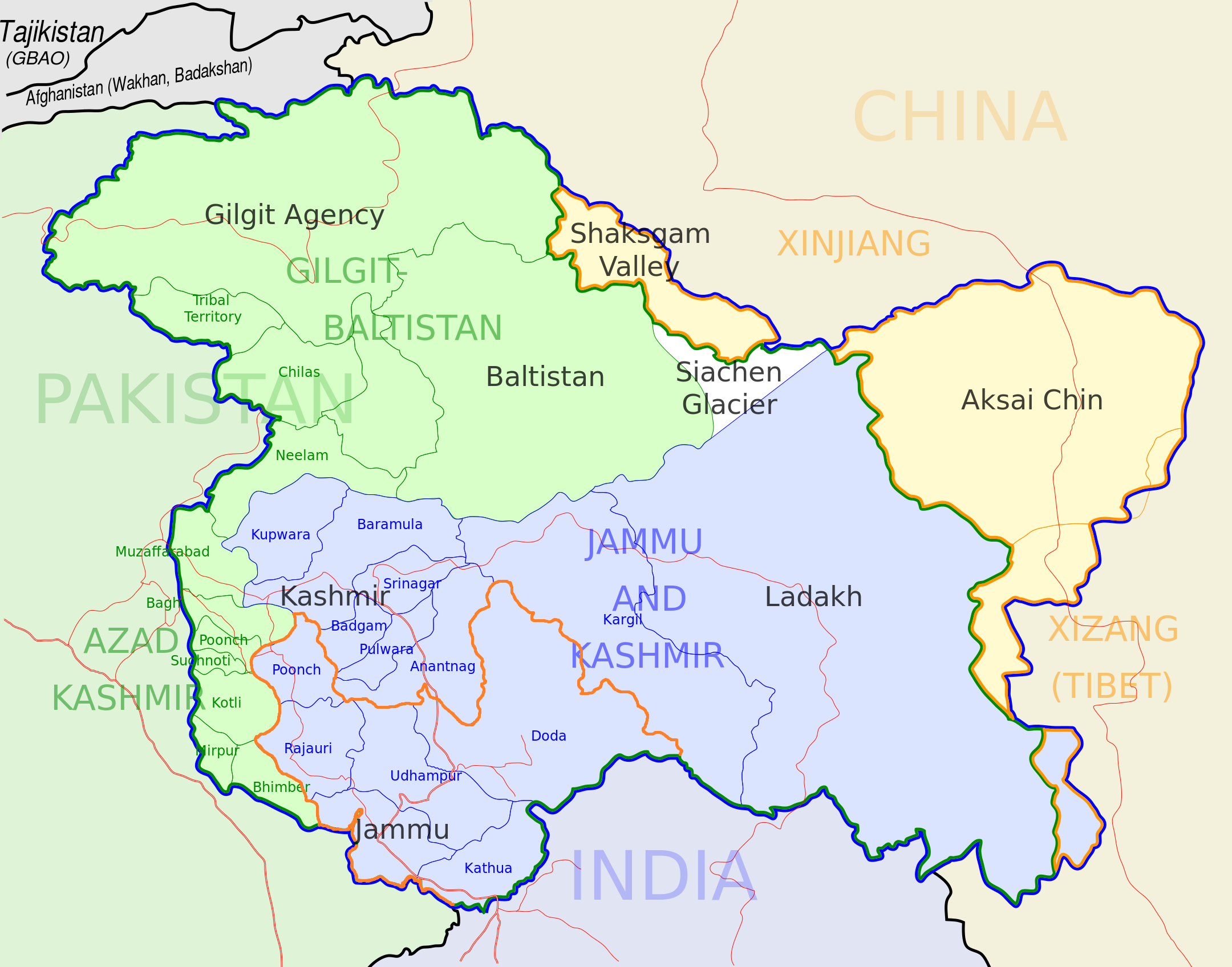
UN map showing Siachen in white. Line between the green and white area is the "Actual Ground Position Line" (AGPL). The white area east of the AGPL is held by India.

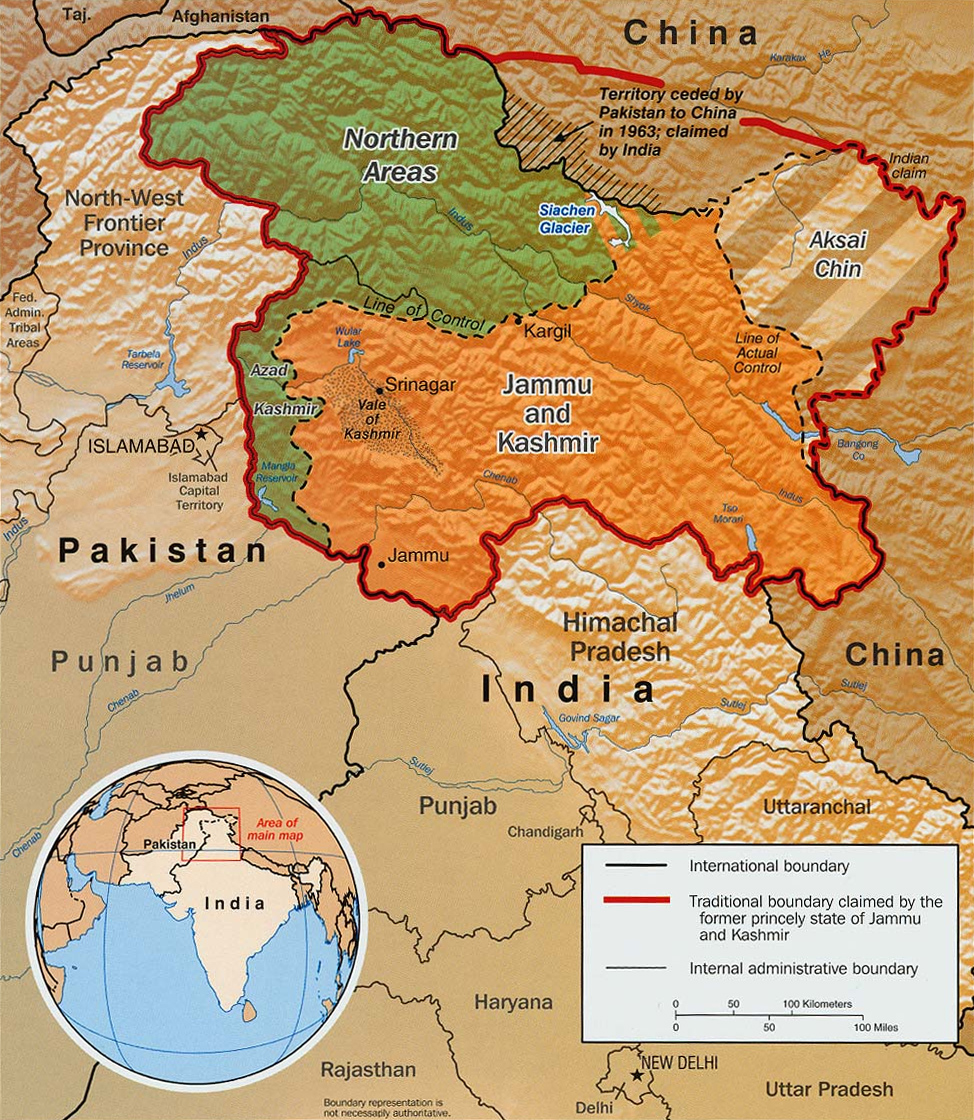
Indo-Pak mutually-agreed undisputed "International Border" (IB) in the black line, Indo-Pak "Line of Control" (LoC) in black dotted line in the north and west, Indo-Sino "Line of Actual" (LAC) in black dotted line in the east, Indo-Pak line across Siachen in north is "Actual Ground Position Line" (AGPL). The areas shown in green are the two Pakistani-controlled areas: Gilgit–Baltistan in the north and Azad Kashmir in the south. The area shown in orange is the Indian-controlled territories of Jammu and Kashmir, and Ladakh, and the diagonally-hatched area to the east is the Chinese-controlled area known as Aksai Chin. "Territories ceded by Pakistan to China claimed by India" in the north is Shaksgam (Trans-Karakoram Tract).

Saltoro Valley (Urdu: وادیِ سلترو) is the highest valley in Pakistan and is located in the Gilgit-Baltistan region. The valley is situated near the Saltoro Mountain Range which includes the prominent Saltoro Kangri peak and the Saltoro River. Saltoro Valley is in proximity to the Siachen Glacier, which is the world's highest battleground and a disputed territory between India and Pakistan.

The Actual Ground Position Line (AGPL) divides the region held by India and Pakistan in the disputed Siachen area, running through the Saltoro Mountain Range. In this area, higher peaks and passes are held by India, while Pakistan holds the lower peaks and valleys. In 1984, India conducted Operation Meghdoot, capturing most of the contested Siachen area.

== History ==
In April 1986, Pakistan launched an assault in the region and gained control of a high point south of Bilafond La, establishing a military post on this peak, which they named "Quaid Post". However, between June 23 and June 26, 1987, India initiated a counter-operation named Operation Rajiv, recapturing the post from Pakistan. They renamed it Bana Top, after Bana Singh, who was awarded India's highest gallantry award, the Param Vir Chakra.

== See also ==
Near the AGPL (Actual Ground Position Line)

- NJ9842 (peak) LoC ends and AGPL begins here
- Gharkun (peak)
- Gyong Kangri (peak)
- Gyong La (pass)
- Goma (Siachen)
- Gyari (valley)
- Chumik Kangri (peak)a
- K12 (mountain) (peak)
- Bana Top (peak)
- Bilafond La
- Saltoro Valley
- Ghent Kangri
- Sia La
- Sia Kangri
- Indira Col
- Operation Vajrasakti / Qaidat

Borders

- Actual Ground Position Line (AGPL)
- India–Pakistan International Border (IB)
- Line of Control (LoC)
- Line of Actual Control (LAC)
- Sir Creek (SC)
- Borders of China
- Borders of India
- Borders of Pakistan

Conflicts

- Kashmir conflict
- Siachen conflict
- Sino-Indian conflict
- List of disputed territories of China
- List of disputed territories of India
- List of disputed territories of Pakistan
- Northern Areas
- Trans-Karakoram Tract

Operations

- Operation Meghdoot, by India
- Operation Rajiv, by India
- Operation Safed Sagar, by India

Other related topics

- Awards and decorations of the Indian Armed Forces
- Bana Singh, after whom Quaid Post was renamed to Bana Top
- Dafdar, westernmost town in Trans-Karakoram Tract
- India-China Border Roads
- Sino-Pakistan Agreement for transfer of Trans-Karakoram Tract to China
