= Goma, Gilgit-Baltistan =

Goma گوما
- Village
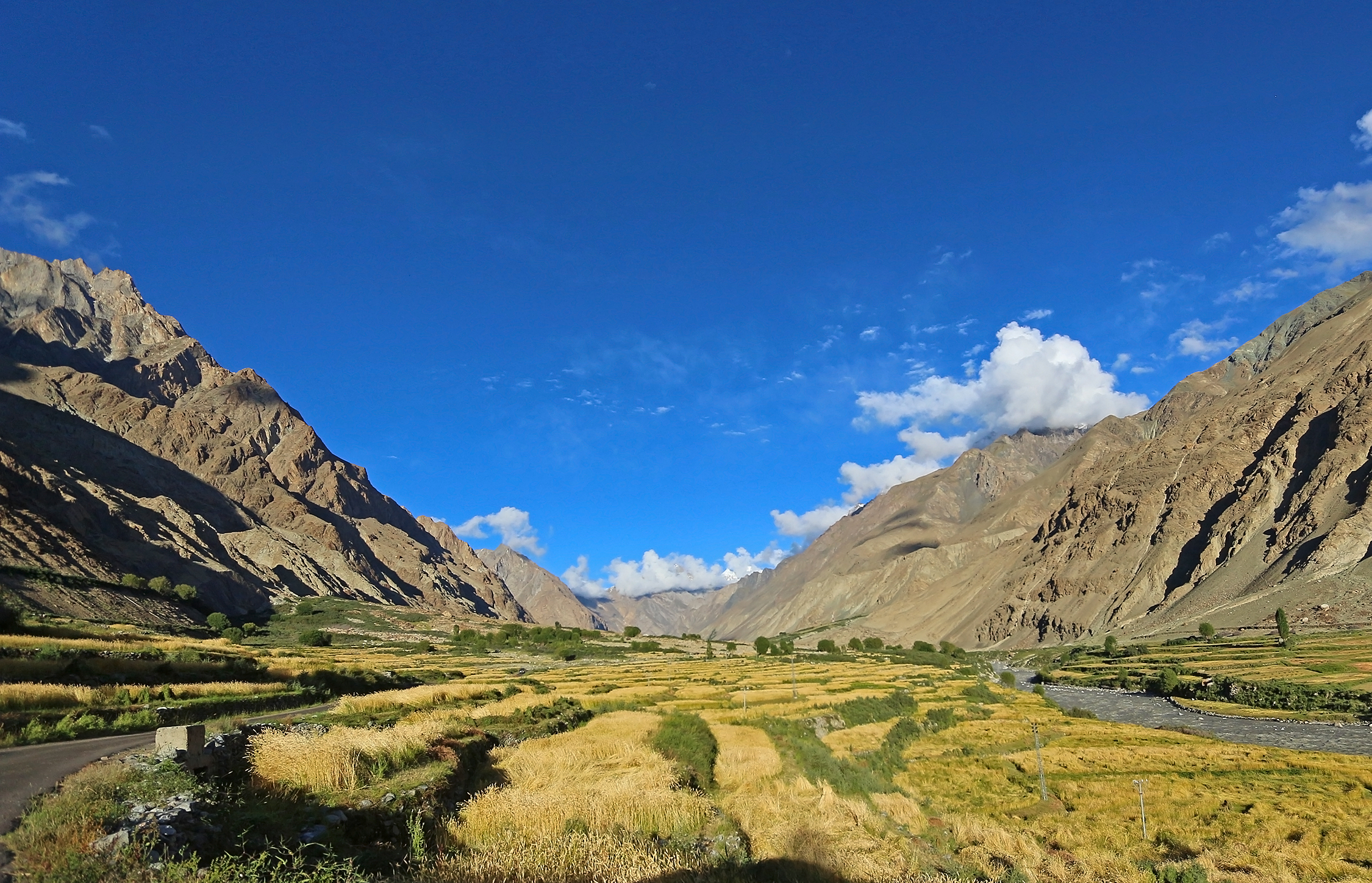
- Interactive map of Goma
- Location within Gilgit Baltistan Location within Pakistan
- Coordinates: 35.148808°N 76.791505°E
- Country: Pakistan
- State: Gilgit-Baltistan
- District: Ghanche
- Tehsil: Masherbrum
- Union council: Saltoro
- Elevation: 3,395 m (11,138 ft)

Population
  - Total: 100
- Time zone: UTC+5:00 (PST)
- PIN: 16920

Goma (Urdu: گوما) is the uppermost village of Saltoro Valley in the Masherbrum Tehsil of the Ghanche District, in Gilgit-Baltistan, a region administered by Pakistan. It is the further most populated settlement and considered as the last village in the district.

== Geography ==
Goma is one of the few settlements located near the Siachen region on the Pakistani side. It lies on the left side of the River Gyong and is located on a set off crossroads leading to further small settlements such as Chuling, Gyong and Gyari, as well as the Chumik Glaciers.

== Education & Health ==
The village has a school and a local civil hospital.

== See also ==
- Saltoro Valley
- Siachen conflict
- Baltistan Division
