= Narendra Kumar (mountaineer) =

Indian Army officer and mountaineer

Colonel Narendra Kumar PVSM, KC, AVSM, FRGS
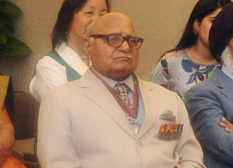
- Narendra Kumar at 2015 Event
- Born: 8 December 1933; Rawalpindi, Punjab, British India (modern-day Pakistan)
- Died: 31 December 2020 (aged 87); Delhi, India
- Other names: Narinder Sharma, Bull
- Military career
- Allegiance: India
- Branch: Indian Army
- Service years: 1954–1984
- Rank: Colonel
- Nicknames: Bull, Jamboree
- Service number: IC-6729
- Unit: Kumaon Regiment
- Conflicts: Operation Meghdoot
- Awards: Param Vishisht Seva Medal; Kirti Chakra; Ati Vishisht Seva Medal; Padma Shri; MacGregor Medal; Arjuna Award

Colonel Narendra Kumar, PVSM, KC, AVSM, FRGS (8 December 1933 – 31 December 2020) was an Indian soldier and mountaineer. He is known for his expeditions across various mountain ranges such as the Himalayas and Karakorams, and respective subranges such as the Pir Panjals and Saltoro Mountains. His reconnaissance efforts on the Siachen glacier were key to the Indian Army's reclamation of the forward posts of the glacier in Operation Meghdoot in 1984. He was the deputy leader of the first successful Indian Mount Everest expedition in 1965.

He was a recipient of multiple military and civilian honours including the Param Vishisht Seva Medal, Kirti Chakra, and the Padma Shri.

== Early life ==
Kumar was born in Rawalpindi, British India on 8 December 1933, in a Punjabi Hindu family. He had three brothers and two sisters; he and his brothers joined the Indian Army. In 1947, he took part in the World Scout Jamboree to Paris at the age of 13, representing the then state of Punjab. He returned to a partitioned India. Most Muslims on his ship were de-boarded in Karachi while everyone else landed in Bombay. His parents had moved to Shimla after the partition of India.

== Army life and mountaineering ==
Kumar joined the Indian Army in 1950. At the Joint Services Wing (then at the Indian Military Academy in Dehradun) he earned his nickname "Bull," during a boxing match against a senior cadet, Sunith Francis Rodrigues, later the Chief of the Army Staff. He would lose that bout, but the nickname that he would earn from that fight, "Bull," would stay on through the rest of his career. He was commissioned with the Kumaon Regiment, a regiment of the Indian Army, as a second lieutenant on 6 June 1954, and was promoted lieutenant on 6 June 1956. During his service with the regiment, he was exposed to winter sports and mountaineering.

In 1958, when he opted for the mountaineering course at Himalayan Mountaineering Institute (HMI), Darjeeling, he was first refused by his Regimental Centre Commandant. However, he was allowed when he expressed his readiness to skip his annual leave to complete the course. After getting in, and with the Principal out on an expedition, Kumar was under Tenzing Norgay, one of the first two individuals known to ascend Mount Everest, who looked after the course as Director of Field Training. Here his interest in mountaineering was further piqued. He soon became a good friend of Tenzing Norgay. He was also put in charge of the course for the officers.

=== 1958: Trishul mountain expedition ===
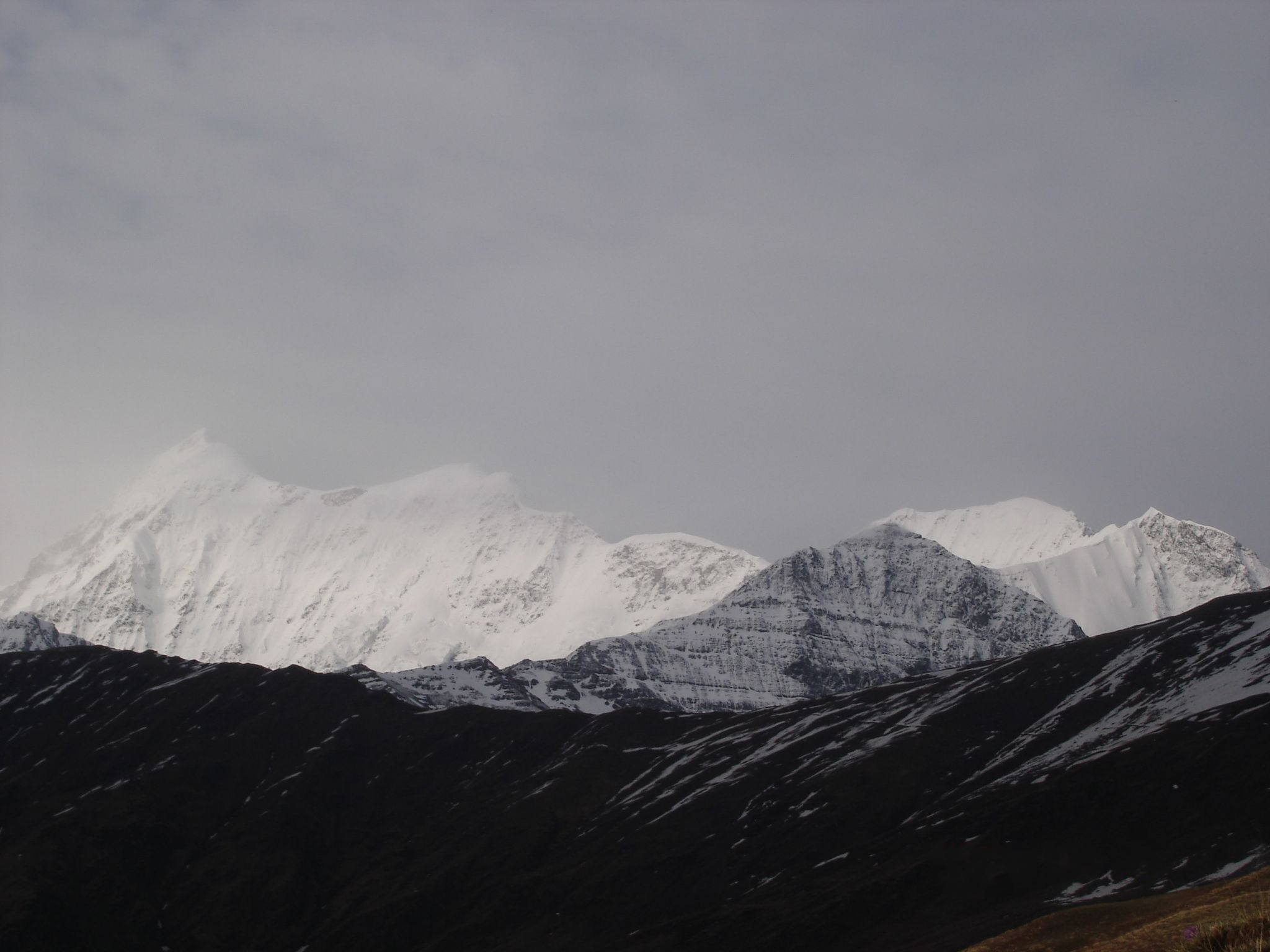
Trishul peak. Later in his career, Kumar would successfully ski down the Trisul mountains, the highest summit to ever be skied down at the time at 23,360 feet (7,120 m).

As leader, Kumar's first expedition to the Trisul mountains was suggested by Norgay. The expedition was initially sponsored by a New York Times correspondent. When the Director of Military Intelligence got to know that the Principal of HMI was undertaking an expedition with foreign money, he stopped the entire program. However, the HMI Principal provided an explanation to General Thimayya, the Chief of Army Staff. General Thimayya crowdfunded the money, making Kumar rather unpopular at the time at his Regimental Centre. Personally, he had to sell his motorbike and radio transistor to raise funds. At the time, neither he nor the team had proper mountaineering gear. For their feet, they would wear alternating layers of socks and polythene so as to keep their feet warm and dry. In March 1958, he led the successful Army and Navy expedition to the Trisul mountains [23,360 feet (7,120 m)]. Later in his career, Kumar would successfully ski down the Trisul mountains, the highest summit to ever be skied down at the time.

=== 1960: First Indian Everest expedition ===
In 1959, senior Indian government officials sent a letter to all mountaineers about an Indian Everest expedition including information about its cost and contributions towards it. Through his Brigade Commander, Kumar, who was still reeling from the finances of the first expedition, was able to contribute ₹50,000 (equivalent to ₹4.9 million or US$51,000 in 2026) to the expedition. A pre-expedition climb helped select the final team for the ascent and Kumar made it to the first list. The final team was well prepared and well equipped. It consisted of five climbers, a doctor, a signals officer, 50 Sherpas, and 70 porters (the porters would return from base camp). However, the team was not able to successfully reach the summit. Kumar became the first Indian to ascend to [28,700 feet (8,700 m)]. He was promoted captain on 6 June of that year.

=== 1961–1964: Barahoti, Nilkantha and Nanda Devi ===
One of the first army operations that Kumar was sent to was to Barahoti (known to the Chinese as Wuje). He was to lead the mission. Before the mission, Prime Minister Nehru himself asked Kumar if he was ready for the mission. He had the entire government machinery to get things done within the limited time frame. He chose his team from members of the para platoon. Lance Naik Hansa Datt was Kumar's buddy. The importance of the mission lay in the fact that the Chinese considered Barahoti as their territory. On the successful completion of the mission, Kumar was congratulated by the Prime Minister, Defence Minister and senior army commanders. A Dakota supply aircraft had crashed on its way back from a supply drop to the group. When he heard of the news, he went back for the bodies.

In 1961, he led a five-member expedition to scale Neelkanth [21,644 feet (6,597 m)] in the Garhwal Himalayas. In this trip, he lost four toes with frostbite and stopped 200m below the summit. In 1964, he was the first Indian to scale Nanda Devi, India's second highest peak.

=== 1965: Everest expedition, Kangchenjunga climb and onwards ===
Kumar was the deputy leader of a nine-member Indian Everest Expedition in 1965, that successfully summited the mountain. In 1970 he led the first recognised ascent of [23,997 feet (7,314 m)] Jomolhari (Chomo Lhari), the highest mountain in Bhutan. The King of Bhutan sponsored the expedition and the Indian Military with a team comprising Indians and Royal Bhutan Army personnel supported by Sherpas from Darjeeling. On 9 June 1966, by now an acting major, Kumar was appointed Principal of the Himalayan Mountaineering Institute, with the local rank of lieutenant-colonel. He was promoted substantive major on 6 June the following year. On 21 January 1971, he was appointed Principal of the Ski School at Gulmarg, with the local rank of lieutenant-colonel.

In 1977, Kumar led the first successful ascent of the Kangchenjunga, the third highest mountain in the world, from the north eastern side. This was a feat that was considered by some as greater than climbing Everest. For 45 years numerous expeditions tried the ascent but failed. He wrote in the American Alpine Club's publication that the team consisted entirely of personnel from the Indian Army – sixteen climbers and two doctors. On 31 May 1977, two men from the team, Major Prem Chand and Naik Nima Dorje Sherpa reached the summit.

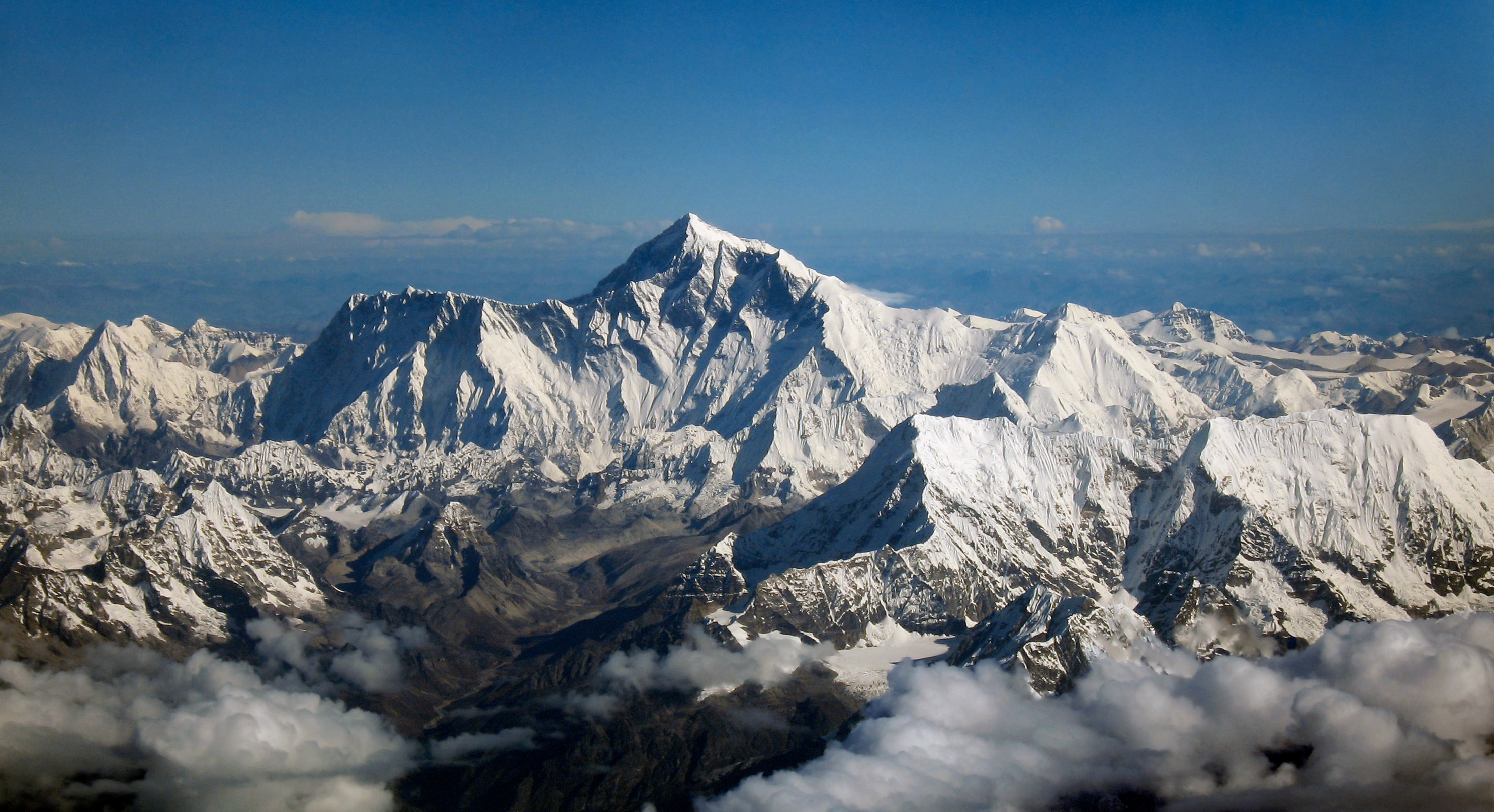
Kumar was the deputy leader of the first successful Indian Everest Expedition in 1965.

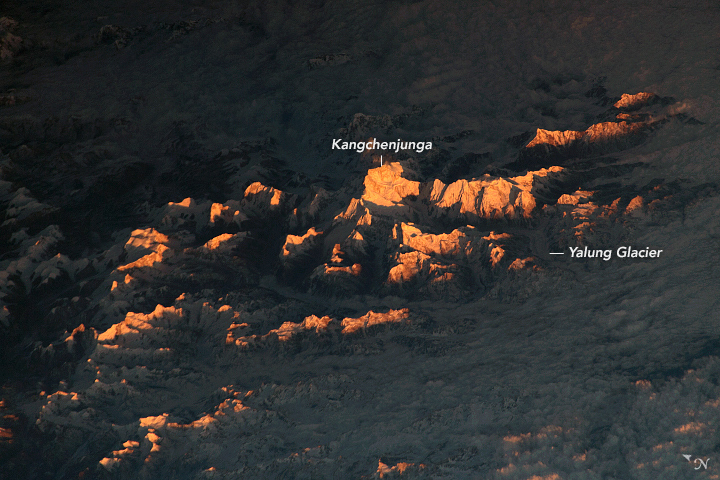
In 1977, he led the successful ascent of the Kangchenjunga from the north-east spur.

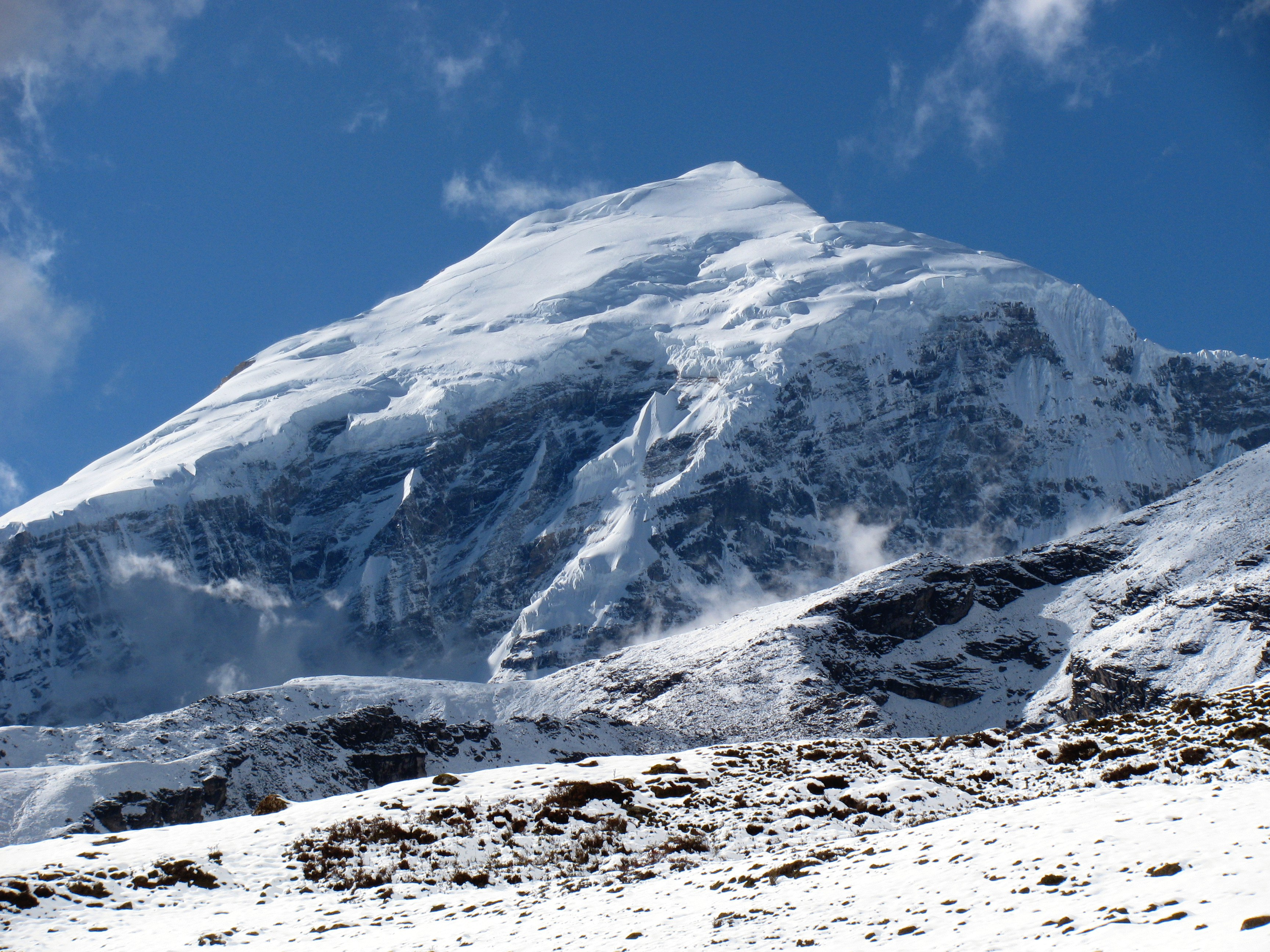
In 1970, he led the first recognised ascent of Jomolhari, the highest mountain in Bhutan.

Kumar was promoted colonel on 2 March 1979. In 1981, he was a member of the Antarctica Task Force, chartered with acclimatising and training the first Indian expedition to the continent, led by S. Z. Qasim, in 1982. In 1983, he summited Kamet [25,595 feet (7,801 m)] and Abi Gamin [24,272 feet (7,398 m)]. During his mountaineering career, he ascended above [8,000 metres (26,000 ft)] on Mount Everest, more than twenty times. He also became the commandant of the Gulmarg based High Altitude Warfare School and Principal of the Himalayan Mountaineering Institute. Kumar also made the first rafting descent of the Indus River in Ladakh and the river Teesta in Sikkim. He retired from the Indian Army in 1984.

=== Mountaineering expeditions to Siachen ===
Location of Siachen Glcacier

Kumar's mountaineering efforts on the Siachen Glacier began when he was approached by a German rafter, in 1977, to help him with a descent on the Nubra river. At this time Kumar was the commanding officer of the Indian Army's High Altitude Warfare School. Kumar, spotting a cartographic error in the US demarcated map, which incorrectly showed the line marking the ceasefire agreement between India and Pakistan, took his findings in January 1978 to Lieutenant General M. L. Chibber, then India's Director of Military Operations. Chiber obtained the necessary permissions for Kumar to lead a reconnaissance mission to the glacier.

Starting at the snoutof the glacier, the team went to the mid-way point from where a summit team of three completed its ascent of Teram Kangri II [24,631 feet (7,508 m)], at the southern end of Shaksgam Valley. The team was helped by the Indian Air Force with rations and other logistical support. The team returned with remains left behind by Pakistan's incursions into the region.

In April 1981, Kumar returned to the Siachen Glacier with a 70-member team. This time, the team would start from the Saltoro Mountains. In this expedition, he would become the first to climb the Siachen Glacier, the world's second longest non–polar glacier. In a period of eight weeks, the team would summit Saltoro Kangri I (25,400 feet) and Sia Kangri I (24,350 ft), hike to the top of Indira Col at 24,493 ft, and ski to Bilafond La, Saltoro Pass, Sia La, Turkistan La and Pass Italia passes on Saltoro. Kumar published accounts of his expeditions in the news magazine The Illustrated Weekly of India, as well as reports in the Himalayan Journal (see Writings). The first account was of the Teram Kangri I ascent in October 1978. The second account was in 1981 of Sia Kangri and Saltoro Kangri.

Kumar's expeditions to the Siachen glacier, and the detailed topographical mapping exercise, as well as photographs and videos from his expeditions helped the then Prime Minister of India, Indira Gandhi, to authorise Operation Meghdoot. Crediting Kumar's contributions being instrumental in the Indian Army's efforts to ending Pakistan's occupation of the glacier, Lieutenant General V. R. Raghavan, commanding officer of the operation, called him 'a mountain of information'.

== Personal life ==
Kumar was married to Mridula Sadgopal on 21 February 1966. Their daughter, Shailaja Kumar (born 1967), competed in the 1988 Winter Olympics in Calgary, Canada in alpine skiing, and was the first Indian female winter Olympian. Their son, Akshay Kumar (1969–2020), ran Mercury Himalayan Explorations, an adventure travel and rafting company. In 1985, his youngest brother, Major K. I. Kumar also went on to ascend Mount Everest; however, he would die in a fall from a height of 8,500 m. Kumar went to retrieve his brothers body, this would be his last time on Everest.

Kumar lived in Delhi until his death at the Army Research and Referral Hospital in Delhi on 31 December 2020. He was aged 87.

== Awards and recognition ==
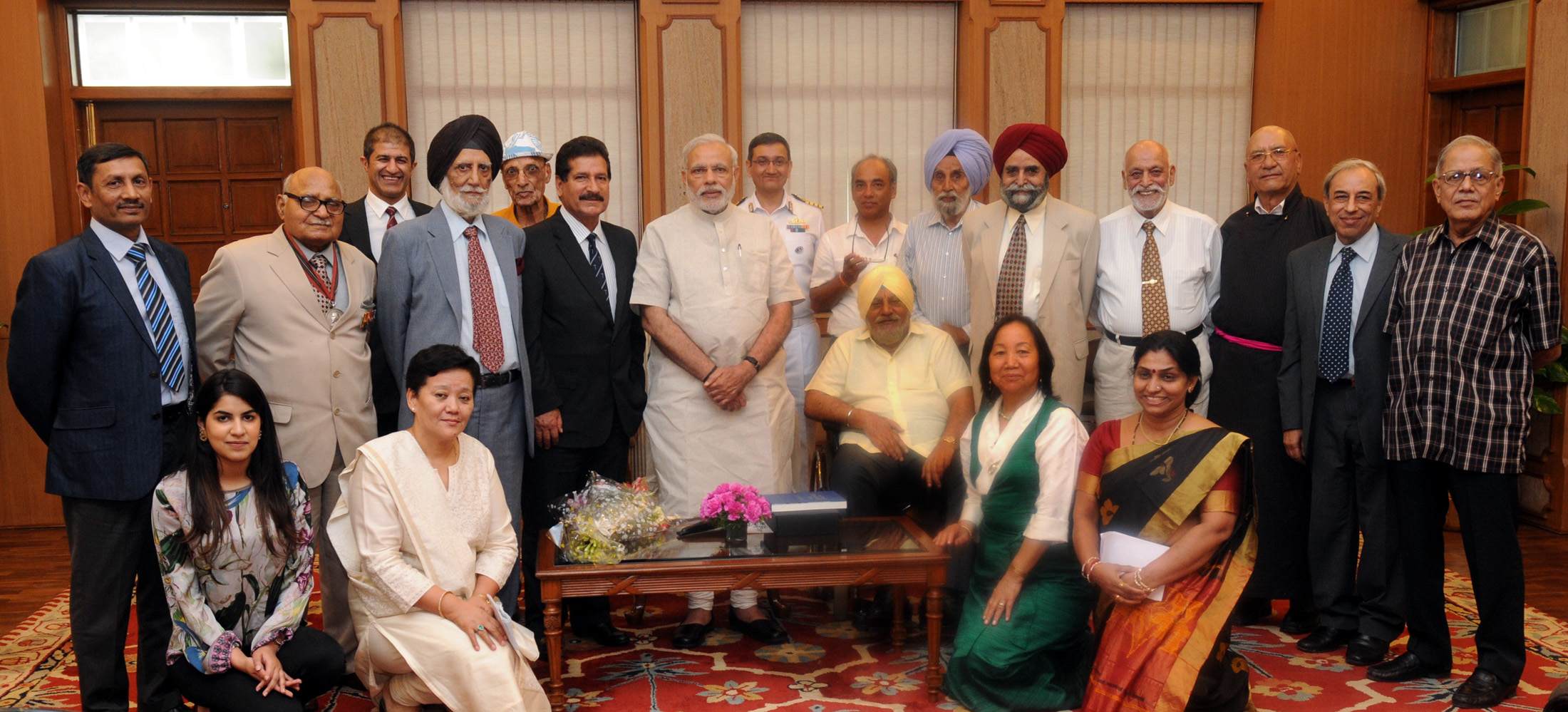
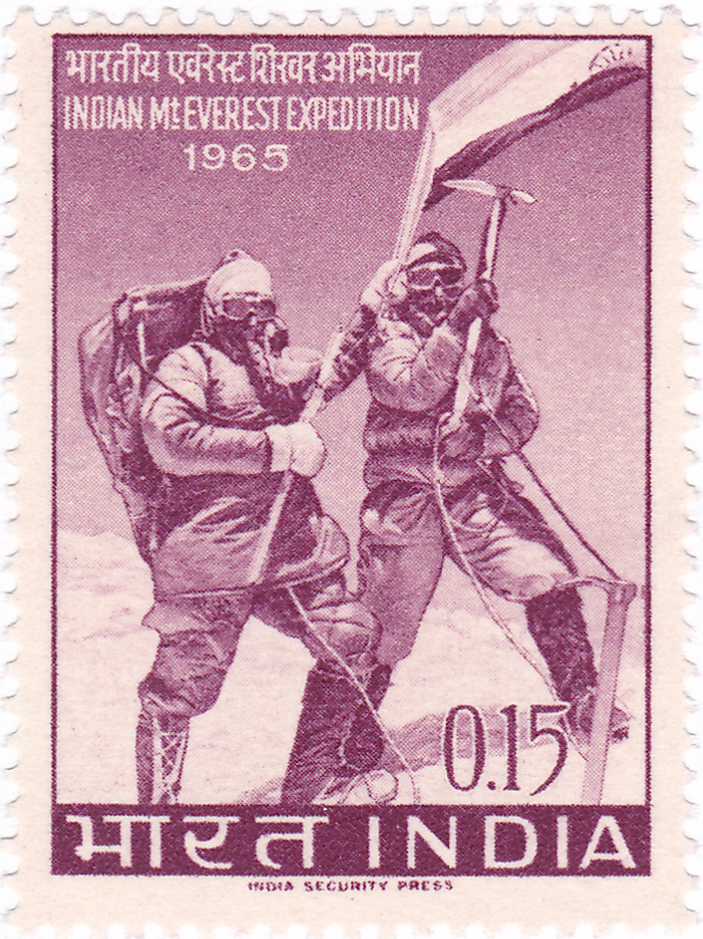
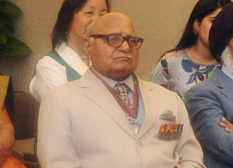
- Top: Prime Minister Modi meets the members of the Indian Everest Expedition 1965 on the Golden Jubilee of the occasion in 2015. Kumar is on the left, second from end.
- Bottom right: Narender Kumar at the meet.
- Bottom left: A 1965 Indian stamp dedicated to the 1965 Everest Expedition

Kumar's mountaineering achievements were recognised by military and civilian awards and honours. He was awarded the Padma Shri, India's fourth highest civilian honour, and the Arjuna Award, in 1965, for the first Indian Everest Expedition of 1965. He remains the only Colonel to have received the Param Vishisht Seva Medal. He also received the Army's Kirti Chakra and Ati Vishisht Seva Medal. He was awarded the Indian Mountaineering Foundation's gold medal for his mountaineering achievements. In 2010, he was presented the MacGregor Medal, by the United Service Institution of India, for his military reconnaissance and exploration efforts of remote Indian areas between 1978 and 1981. Kumar was also a Fellow of the Royal Geographical Society.

The Indian Army's Siachen Battalion HQ in the Siachen Glacier is named as "Kumar Base" in his honour; the base is also a logistics forwarding post.

He was also awarded a United Nations fellowship for ski teaching. He had also trained in Austria and Switzerland as a ski-trainer.

Medal bar

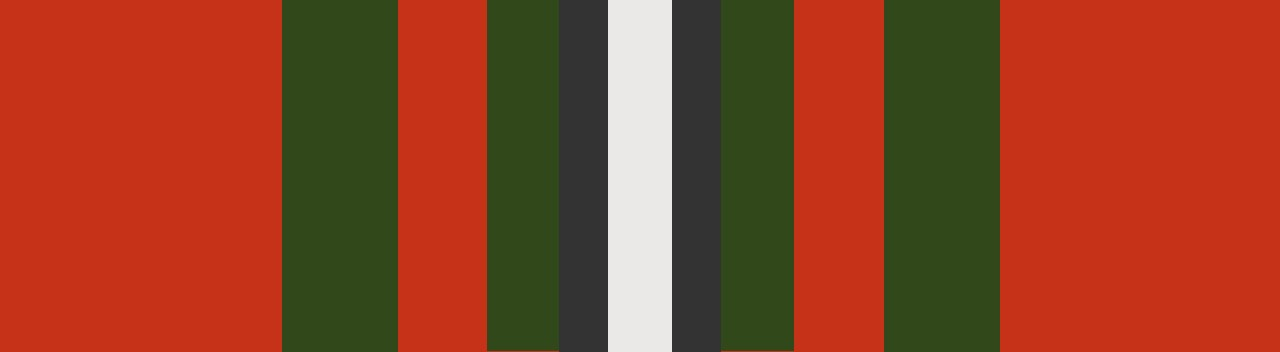

Param Vishisht Seva Medal	Kirti Chakra	Padma Shri	MacGregor Medal
Ati Vishisht Seva Medal	General Service Medal 1947	Samanya Seva Medal	Special Service Medal
Raksha Medal	Sangram Medal	Sainya Seva Medal (clasp for Jammu and Kashmir)	High Altitude Service Medal
25th Anniversary of Independence Medal	30 Years Long Service Medal	20 Years Long Service Medal	9 Years Long Service Medal

== In popular culture ==
- A film titled 'Bull', based on the life of Narendra Bull Kumar has been announced in January 2021. Producers Ramon Chibb and Anku Pande have acquired the rights for the film.

== Writings ==
- Col N. Kumar (1981). Teram Kangri II Expedition. The Himalayan Journal (Vol.37)
- Col N. Kumar (1983). The Indian Army Expedition To The Eastern Karakoram, 1981. The Himalayan Journal (Vol.39)
- Kumar, Narinder; Malhotra, Kapil; Pasricha, Ram Nath (1987). Kamet east, Kamet west: the Kumaoni Expedition. New Delhi, India: Vision Books. ISBN 978-81-7094-003-6.
- Kumar, Col N; Bhatia, Col N N (2016). Soldier Mountaineer: The Colonel who got Siachen Glacier for India. Vij Books. ISBN 9789385563560.

== See also ==
- Mountain warfare
- Oropolitics
- Actual Ground Position Line
- Bana Singh
- Robert D. Hodgson
- Indian summiters of Mount Everest - Year wise
- List of Mount Everest summiters by number of times to the summit
- List of Mount Everest records of India
- List of Mount Everest records
- Siachen Base Camp (India)
