= Robert D. Hodgson =

American geographer

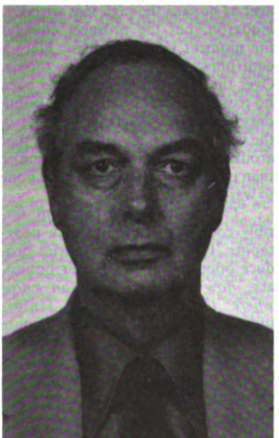
- Born: 7 June 1923
- Died: 4 December 1979 (aged 56); USA
- Spouse: Margaret Hodgson
- Children: 7

Robert David Hodgson (June 7, 1923 - December 4, 1979) was an American geographer and an internationally recognized expert on geographic aspects of the law of the sea and maritime boundaries.

Dr. Hodgson believed that broader understanding of geographic principles would reduce international conflicts. He worked for the State Department as the Director of the Office of the Geographer in the Bureau of Intelligence and Research.

The Hodgson Seamount was named after him. In 1968, Robert D. Hodgson unilaterally extended the ceasefire line between Indian and Pakistan from NJ9842 to Karakoram Pass, after taking a cue from the US ADIZ (Air Defence Identification Zone). Maps while dealing with the question of how the boundaries of the state of Jammu and Kashmir were to be shown in US maps. This led to Siachen conflict between India and Pakistan. In 1986, the US State Department removed this Hodgson's Line.

== Works ==
- The technical delimitation of a modern equidistant boundary (1975). Self-published.
- Islands: normal and special circumstances (Report). U.S. Dept. of State. Bureau of Intelligence and Research. 1973. Research study, RGES-3.
- "Towards an objective analysis of special circumstances: bays, rivers, coastal and oceanic archipelagos and atolls". Occasional Paper. 13 (13). Law of the Sea Institute. 1972.
- Hodgson, Robert D.; Stoneman, Elvyn A. (1968). The Changing Map of Africa. Van Nostrand searchlight book. Vol. 16. D. Van Nostrand.
- The Champlain-Richelieu Lowland: A Study in Historical Geography (dissertation, 1951)

== Personal life ==
Hodgson was married to Margaret Hodgson. Father to David, Laura, Susan, Peter, Mark, Amy, and Luke Hodgson. He graduated with degrees from the University of Michigan.
