= Debsa Pass =

- Location within Himachal Pradesh

Third Approach
- Location: India
- Coordinates: 31°54′15″N 77°48′07″E

Debsa Pass is a 5,360-metre-high (17,590 ft) mountain pass in the Himalaya mountains between the Kullu and Spiti Districts of Himachal Pradesh, India.

Joydeep Sircar led the teams that explored the watershed ridge and discovered the pass after approaching through the Parbati River valley in Kullu. After an abortive attempt on an impassable col further north in 1992, the pass was located and reached in 1993, but the team refrained from crossing it into Spiti under the mistaken impression that they could be arrested because they did not have Inner Line Permits required for Spiti. Two years later, the 1995 team planned to approach from the Spiti side, which involves much less height gain, but tremendous autumn floods in the upper valley of the Beas River and other areas of Himachal which wrecked roads forced them to take the Parbati approach again. This time they crossed the pass on 21 September and completed the route from Manikaran to Kaja.

Leomann's 1:200,000 map of Himachal Pradesh (Third Edition, 2005) shows a dotted track beginning at a point between the Kach (should read Kachh) and Bara Dwari Thach campsites, and crossing the Kullu-Spiti watershed divide into the West Debsa Glacier to follow the West Debsa and Debsa streams to Thidim (should be Thango) in the Parahio Valley. This is a fairly accurate representation of the 1995 route, though the pass is unmarked.
