= Gul Dev =

Indian alpine skier (born 1963)

Personal information
- Full name: Gul Mustafa Dev
- Born: 24 May 1963 (age 63) Jammu and Kashmir, India

Skiing career
- Sport: Alpine skiing
- Disciplines: Slalom

Olympics
- Teams: 1 – (1988)
- Medals: 0

Gul Mustafa Dev was the first Indian Olympian from the state of Jammu and Kashmir, who represented India in the Winter Olympic Games, with two other participants at the 1988 Winter Olympics held at Calgary, Canada (see India at the 1988 Winter Olympics).

== Achievements ==
Apart from participating in the Olympics, Gul Dev was among the first to represent team India at the first Asian Winter Games, which were held from 1 to 8 March 1986 in Sapporo, Hokkaidō, Japan. He also went as a national coach for team India to the Junior Asian Winter Games held at China in 2005. He was the Indian team leader for Treofeo Pinocchio Sugli Sci, held in Italy in 2009. He was the Recipient of the Award Of Excellence In Sports for Jammu and Kashmir in 2011.

== Alpine skiing results ==
=== Olympic results ===
Year	Event	Race 1	Race 2	Total	
Year	Event	Time	Time	Time	Rank
1988	Slalom	DSQ	–	DSQ	–
