= Chumik Glacier Conflict (1989) =

1984 military conflict

Chumik Conflict
- Part of the Siachen conflict
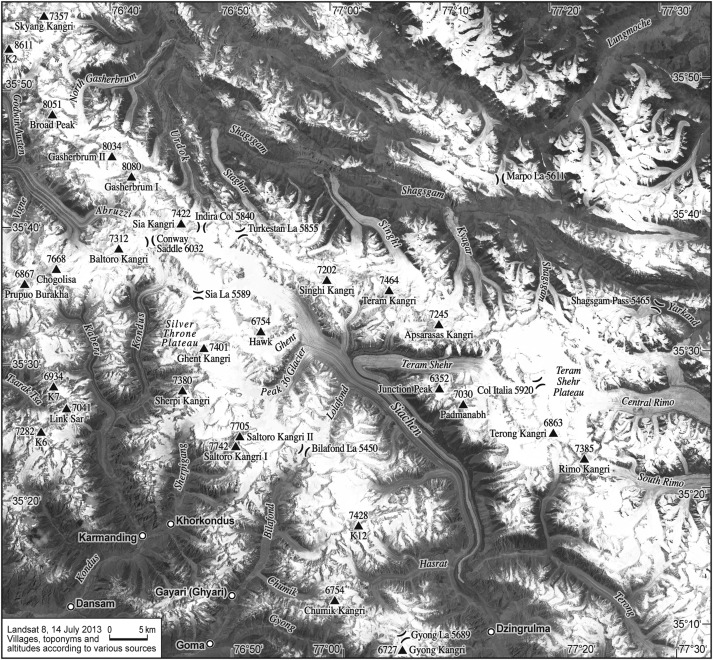
- Satellite imagery of the Siachen Glacier
Date	22 February – 30 April 1989 (2 months, 1 week and 1 day)
Location	Chumik Glacier, Saltoro Mountains
Result	Demilitarization of area

Belligerents
India	Pakistan

Units involved
Indian Army; 102 Mountain Brigade; 2 Dogra; Unknown artillery units; Unknown air defense unit	Pakistan Army; 323 Infantry Brigade; 9 AK; 6 NLI; 9 NLI; 2nd Commando Battalion; 78 Field Regiment; 8 Army Aviation Squadron

Operation Chumik and Operation Ibex refer to two expeditions by Pakistani and Indian military respectively to seize the strategically important Chumik Glacier. Due to heavy combat and severe weather conditions, both sides came to negotiating table and the area was demilitarized

== Background ==
Chumik is small region in Bilafond, which was relatively peaceful since 1984. Frontline posts in this area provided a clear view over Gyong Glacier and Indian military's Baniya Base. A Pakistani post was set up here in 1985. The post was later abolished due to heavy losses of life due to severe weather conditions and artillery fire by India. The post was re-established in 1988 by the Northern Light Infantry Regiment on the order of Commander Force Command Northern Area.

== Indian activities ==
Pakistani intelligence services discovered that India had a plan to capture strategic posts in the Chumik Sector. On 22 February, Indian military helicopters conducted recon operations in the area and then the post was bombarded with artillery fire. In response, the Pakistan Army launched its own recon mission and flew helicopters into the area. They found out that Indian forces had set up five new posts in Chumik area. A complete battalion of Indian army along with multiple artillery pieces and a Lama Helicopter were stationed there. The Indian bases in the area included Ganga, Sadhu, Agra-I, Agra-II and a heavy machine gun post (doubling as observation post). These posts were supplied by Bniya and Rani bases. The Indian Army had also occupied the Naveed Top which was the highest peak in the area and now the Indians had the capability to monitor the activities of Pakistan Army in the area. The Indian Army used this used this peak as a launching point and started bombarding Pakistani forces at Asghar Base.

== Operation Chumik ==
In response Pakistan launched Operation Chumik. Firstly two bases Kausar 1 and Kausar 2 were set up on 17 April. However, due to difficult terrain and severe weather conditions, the operation was immediately aborted.

The second plan was to deploy SSG troops via helicopter, but due to extremely poor weather and terrain, this mission was also aborted.

After a change in plan, On 19 April 1989, the first Pakistani helicopter took off. An officer Lieutenant Naveed of Azad Kashmir regiment and SSG Naik Yaqoob were air dropped. However, due to severe weather, the remaining personnel were airdropped on 21 April.

== Expeditions to Kamran top ==
Pakistani and Indian troops rushed to reach the strategic peak of Kamran top. Pakistani troops reached first and soon Eight Indian soldiers also arrived. When they were about 400 meters from Kamran Top. They were fired upon and forced to retreat. On 30 April 1989, a task force consisting of 11 persons including 4 officers was organised. It was commanded by Major Abdul Rehman Bilal. The party task force reached the machine gun checkpost and attacked it. Indian troops soon retaliated with small arms and rocket fire, which didn't prove to be very effective as Pakistani forces were protected by a boulder.

== Operation Ibex ==
Indian Army under Brig. R. K. Nanavatty launched Operation Ibex, Firstly an artillery attack was carried out on Kauser-1 Base, the Pakistani logistical node in Chumik and successfully damaged it to the extent that the troops at Kamran post couldn't be resupplied. It prompted Pakistani troops to vacate Chumik posts concluding Operation Ibex.

== Aftermath ==
This battle forced Pakistan and India to negotiate and a truce was signed. The area was then vacated by both sides and was demilitarised.India abandoned its aim of taking any further area after this.
