= Operation Brasstacks =

Major combined Indian military exercise in Rajasthan, India

- Type: Indian Army Military exercise
- Planned: General Krishnaswamy Sundarji, CoAS
- Planned by: Western Army Command; Southern Command
- Target: Southern Pakistan
- Objective: Deployment of all Army commands of Indian Army
- Date: 18 November 1986 – 6 March 1987
- Executed by: Indian Army
- Outcome: Exercise halted by India due to international pressure: Exercises were halted; Pakistan redeployed its armed forces; Cricket diplomacy defused the threat

Operation Brasstacks was a combined arms military exercise of the Indian Armed Forces in the state of Rajasthan from November 1986 to January 1987. The operation's aim was to determine tactical nuclear strategy.

As part of a series of exercises to simulate the operational capabilities of the Indian armed forces, it was the largest mobilization of Indian forces on the Indian subcontinent, involving the combined strength of two Army Commands - almost 500,000 troops - half the Indian Army. Operation Brasstacks was tasked with two objectives: the initial goal was the deployment of ground troops. The other objective was to conduct a series of amphibious assault exercises by the Indian Navy near to the Pakistan naval base at Karachi. Operation Brasstacks involved numbers of infantry, mechanized, air assault divisions, and 500,000 army personnel who were massed within 100 miles of Pakistan. An amphibious assault group formed from Indian naval forces was planned and deployed near to the Korangi Creek of Karachi Division in Pakistan. However, the most important aim of this war alert simulation was to determine tactical nuclear strategy, overseen by the Indian Army.

The Pakistan Military regarded this war game as a threatening exhibition of overwhelming conventional force, perhaps even as a rehearsal for nuclear war, amounting to the most critical moment in India–Pakistan relations. The security information website Global Security.org characterized Operation Brasstacks as "bigger than any NATO exercise – and the biggest since World War II". Even today, Pakistani military analysts and strategists regard it as a planned "blitzkrieg-like" integrated deep offensive strategy to infiltrate into dense areas of Central Pakistan. On the other hand, India maintained that "[the] core objective of Operation Brasstacks was to test new concepts of mechanization, mobility, and air support devised by Indian army."

== Background ==
=== Indian Strategic overview ===
After the Indo-Pakistani War of 1971, the Indian Army had long been advocating for practicing modern methods of land-based warfare and professionalism. The Chief of Staff of the Indian Army, General Krishnaswamy Sundarji, an officer who earlier had commanded an infantry division in the Bangladesh Liberation War, threw himself into the Indian Army's modernisation. He was granted permission, and ordered a large scale military exercise to test new concepts of mechanization, mobility, and air support. He issued orders to mobilize the mechanized and armoured divisions, and armed tanks were sent to take position in the Thar Desert. In December 1986, with more than ten thousand armoured vehicles spread across its western desert, India launched the final stage of a huge military exercise that stirred new tensions with Pakistan.

The scale of the operation was bigger than any North Atlantic Treaty Organization (NATO) exercise and the biggest land exercise since World War II. Initially, around 600,000–800,000 troops were mobilized and stationed on Rajasthan state's western border, less than 100 miles away from Pakistan. The commander of the Indian Army's Western Command, Lieutenant General Prem Nath Hoon, maintained that, "Operation Brasstacks was a mobilization of the entire Army of India."

The magnitude and large scale of the exercise led to Pakistani fears that India was displaying an overwhelming conventional superiority and was planning to invade Pakistan and dismember it by surgical strikes, as it did to East Pakistan during the Indo-Pak 1971 Winter war. According to General Hoon's memoirs, a letter was directed to Sundarji by Western Command, arguing that "when such a large exercise is conceived", the movement of Indian forces is going to attract the attention of Pakistan. General Hoon maintained that, General Sundarji did not inform Prime Minister Rajiv Gandhi about the scale of the operation and such details were hidden from him. Hoon also wrote in his memoir: "Brasstacks was no military exercise. It was a plan to build up the situation for a fourth war with Pakistan." Indian scholar, Paul Kapur further argues that during Operation Brasstacks, the Indian Army lobbied the government multiple times, but unsuccessfully, to attack Pakistan.

It is theorised by author Robert Art and others that the Brasstacks crisis was not an inadvertent and accidental crisis caused by Pakistan's misinterpretation of a large scale Indian Army exercise, confined mainly to the vast Rajasthan desert sector, as provocative. In this theory, General Sunderji's strategy was to provoke Pakistan to respond and this would provide India with an excuse to implement existing contingency plans to go on to the offensive against Pakistan and destroy its atomic bomb projects in a series of preventive strikes.

=== Pakistan strategic response ===
After the success of the Israeli Air Force's surprise Operation Opera air strike on the Iraqi nuclear power plant in Osirak in 1981, the Pakistan Armed Forces had been on alert. According to memoirs of nuclear strategist and theoretical physicist Munir Ahmad Khan, hectic discussions took place every day between the Ministries of Defence and Foreign Affairs, amid fears that India might attack Pakistan, who was on route to becoming a nuclear power. Since 1981, the commanders of the Pakistan Armed Forces were given standing orders to mobilize their forces at once, from all directions, as quick as it could to divert such attacks.

When Brasstacks was executed, Pakistan quickly responded with maneuvers of its own forces, first mobilizing the entire V Corps and then the Southern Air Command, near the Indian state of Punjab. Within weeks, the Pakistan Navy's combat ships and submarines were deployed for the purpose of intelligence management, in the northern Arabian Sea. The Government of Pakistan viewed this military exercise as a direct threat to Pakistan's physical existence. This included further orders to deploy the entire Armoured Corps, with the V Corps, to move to the front lines. By mid-January 1987, the Pakistani Armed Forces and Indian Army personnel stood within firing range along an extended border area. The Foreign Office of Pakistan summoned the Indian Ambassador to Pakistan, S. K. Singh, at midnight, to meet with Minister of State for Foreign Affairs, Zain Noorani, who had just returned from an emergency meeting with Pakistan's President Zia-ul-Haq. Noorani advised the Indian Embassy that he had an important message from President Zia. Noorani officially advised Singh that in the event of violation of Pakistan's sovereignty and territorial integrity by India, Pakistan was "capable of inflicting unacceptable damage on it." When Singh asked Noorani whether this implied an [atomic] attack on Bombay, Noorani replied: "it might be so".

The situation could have potentially lead to a war between a de facto nuclear weapon state (India—who had already conducted a nuclear test in 1974, Smiling Buddha, and a state known to have nuclear infrastructure, that was believed to be developing nuclear weapons at that time (Pakistan).

=== 1987 Pakistan atomic alert ===
In January 1987, Pakistan had put its nuclear installations on high alert, and the crisis atmosphere was heightened. During this time, Abdul Qadeer Khan gave an interview to Indian diplomat, Kuldip Nayar in which he made it clear that "Pakistan would use its atomic weapons if its existence was threatened"; although he later denied having made such a statement. Indian diplomats in Islamabad claimed that they were warned that Pakistan would not hesitate to use nuclear weapons if attacked. Pakistan denied the veracity of these statements.

== Aftermath ==
=== Cricket diplomacy ===
The tensions diminished in March 1987, with an agreement by the two nations to withdraw 150,000 troops in the Kashmir area, followed by a second agreement to withdraw more troops in the desert area that was signed the same month. While negotiating the withdrawal accord, India vowed to proceed with Brasstacks, asserting that Pakistan had no reason to feel provoked. India did delay the beginning of the last stage of the operation until the following week, while the latest withdrawal agreement was being negotiated. To prove its intentions were peaceful, India took the unusual step of inviting diplomats and journalists to observe the operation separately. Pakistani Foreign Service officers, senior diplomats and statesmen were those who were invited. According to an unnamed Western diplomat, "This was not a third-world army. This was a modern army, fully competent for any mission, easily as good as the Chinese, the Koreans or the French."

Pakistan's President Zia visited India in February 1987, having been invited to see a cricket match between the two countries. Zia's estimation was that he and Indian Prime Minister Rajiv Gandhi could meet quite cordially, but could not agree on substantive issues.

=== Effects and legacy ===
According to the Indian Army, Brasstacks was only an exercise and not supposed to be a provocative one. The media, particularly the Western media, was involved after this and intense diplomatic manoeuvres followed preventing any further escalation in hostilities. On multiple occasions, General Sunderji maintained that: "This was, is and always has been a training exercise. I can't answer why there have been misperceptions about it in some quarters." India repeatedly accused Pakistan of continuing scientific research on atomic bombs; Pakistan continued to sharply reject the claims. A few days later, A. Q. Khan also rejected any statements issued regarding atomic bomb development, and has since said "his comments were taken out of context."

The real motives behind the exercise remain disputed. In 1999, a former senior Indian Army officer, Lieutenant-General P. N. Hoon, remarked that the operation had mobilized the entire Indian Army to Pakistan's eastern border. He further notes that, Brasstacks was a plan to build up a situation for a fourth war with Pakistan. Western scholars have theorized that Brasstacks was an accidental crisis, caused by Pakistan's misinterpretation of an inadvertently provocative Indian Army exercise. Robert Art suggests that, "General Sunderji's strategy was to provoke Pakistan's response and this would provide India with an excuse to implement existing contingency plans to go on to offensive against Pakistan and take out its atomic bomb projects in preventive strikes." Even today, Pakistani military analysts and strategists regarded this as a "blitzkrieg-like" integrated deep offensive strategy to infiltrate into dense areas of Pakistan. The New York Times noted that India's accelerated drive for military technology, motivated Pakistan to turn to its rationale of stockpiling atomic bombs as a nuclear deterrent.

== Sources ==
- Sunil Dasgupta, "Operation Brasstacks," Bulletin of the Atomic Scientists, October 1996 (book review noting previous coverage of the operation).
