= Battle of Bahadur Post =

Battle between Pakistan and India during Siachen conflict

Battle of Bahadur post
- Part of the Siachen conflict
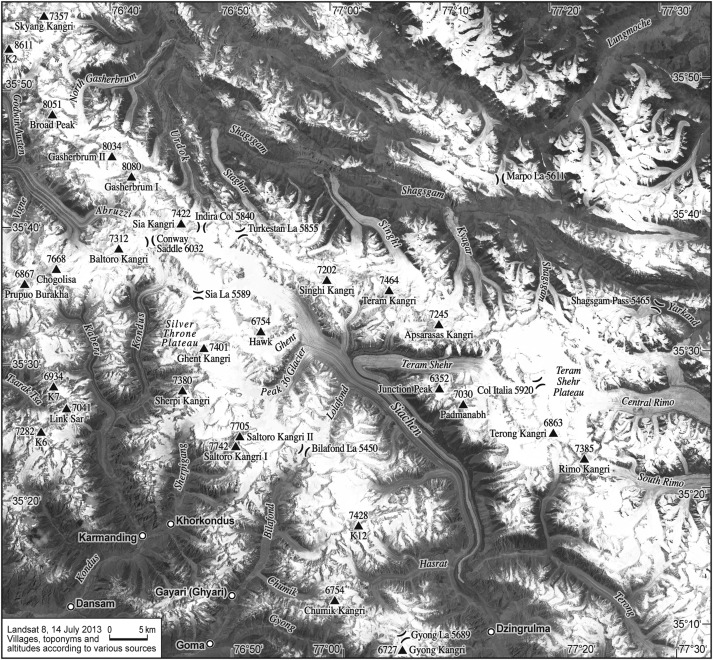
- Satellite imagery of the Siachen Glacier
Date	20 July – 3 August 1992
Location	Bahadur post
Result	Indian victory: Pakistani assault repulsed

Belligerents
India	Pakistan

Units involved
Indian Army: 12th Jammu and Kashmir Rifles; Indian Artillery Regiment	Pakistan Army: Northern Light Infantry Regiment; Force Command Northern Areas; Pakistani artillery Regiment

Casualties and losses
Unknown	72 killed (including 11 officers); One Aérospatiale SA 315B Lama shot down

Battle of Bahadur post (Indian codename: Operation Trishul Skakti) was a military engagement between Pakistani and Indian forces. Pakistani forces attempted to capture Bahadur post in Chulung followed by the start of defence operations codenamed Operation Trishul Shakti by Indian forces.

== Background ==
The Siachen conflict between India and Pakistan began over the disputed 1,000-square-mile (2,600 km^{2}) Siachen Glacier region in Kashmir. The conflict was started in 1984 by India's successful capture of the Siachen Glacier as part of Operation Meghdoot, and continued with Operation Rajiv in 1987. India took control of the 70-kilometre-long (43 mi) Siachen Glacier and its tributary glaciers, as well as all the main passes and heights of the Saltoro Ridge immediately west of the glacier, including Sia La, Bilafond La, and Gyong La. In Chulung, due to recent Indian armed forces deployments and under the cover of bad weather, Pakistani forces initiated their offensive.

== Battle ==
=== Defence preparations ===
Multiple small scale assaults provided large gains for Pakistan in Siachen including one at this post earlier the year on March at 6:50 in the evening, when Pakistani forces started attack on the Indians using RPGs, AA guns and light weapons destroying an Indian bunker. Then Pakistani forces started a military build up in the Chulung La Glacier to prepare for capturing the ridge. The military post in the area, named Bahadur post, was under the control of the recently deployed 12th Jammu and Kashmir Rifles. Indian forces anticipating the Pakistani assault had also started preparations.

=== Pakistani offensive ===
Pakistani forces under the cover of bad weather and low visibility started their campaign on 20 July. By 28 July, Indian forces started noticing signs of Pakistani activities in the region and resultantly a search party was organised but no Pakistani forces were detected. On 29 July another search party reported the arrival of Pakistani forces. Indian forces were instructed to engage Pakistani troops with mortars and small arms fire. On 31 July, seven sorties of Lama helicopters landed many Pakistani troops into the battlefield.

=== Indian response ===
At the dominating positions Indian forces constructed a fire support base. Reserves from Indian forces were transferred to the frontlines. Pakistani forces were struck by small arms fire from the firebase in addition to artillery and mortar fire. An Indian force was sent from Bahadur post to occupy the Saddle OP (Tiger Saddle). Indian forces were quickly able to gain full control of Saddle OP (Tiger Saddle). Pakistani forces started artillery fire in order to provide cover to Pakistani forces. For two days, multiple small scale engagements were reported. The ground combat resulted in sixty nine fatalities on the Pakistani side including eight officers. Casualties on Indian side were reported to be unknown but still heavy. Indian armed forces also deployed Mil Mi-17 helicopters in the region for military operations as well as for search and rescue operations.

=== Helicopter shootdown ===
On 1 August, two Pakistani Lama helicopters were detected by Indian forces who fired their Igla MANPADS upon them. One of the helicopters carrying the commander of 323rd Brigade, Brigadier Masood Anwari, was struck, killing him and two others. It was the first shootdown of a Pakistani helicopter by an Indian MANPADS system. Indian force also deployed another SAM squadron which was to partake in the Republic Day parade to the area in order to strengthen their defence in the region against Pakistani intrusions. The helicopter crash led to a loss of momentum on the Pakistani side and stalled the offensive. Artillery duels continued till 3 August.

== Aftermath ==
High altitude combat exponentially favoured the Indian defenders as they were, logistically. Due to the terrain attack directions were predictable making defence easier than offense. The employment of companies and battalions made the attack predictable but both sides did not use combat aircraft in the conflict. In such a hostile environment, giving up the strategic gains made by the military was an embarrassment. Hence, Pakistan was compelled to start peace negotiations to end the Siachen conflict.

This battle brought negotiations in favour of India. Pakistani officials sent a proposal to India about ending the Siachen conflict and withdrawal of troops from both sides of the front. This was in accordance with the Indian demands about ending the Siachen conflict and was widely accepted by Indian political leadership but the Indian military did not accept the proposal and the conflict continued till 2003.

High casualties of around 72 Pakistani troops dead and several hundred wounded led to the dismissal of Force Command Northern Areas Major General Zahirul Islam Abbasi from his command by the army chief Gen. Asif Nawaz. Moreover, helicopter shootdown led to the formation of a designated Igla squadron by Indian military.

== See Also ==
- Operation Meghdoot
- Operation Safed Sagar
- Siachen Conflict
- Battle of Haji-Pir Pass
