= Prem Nath Hoon =

Indian military officer (1929–2020)

Lieutenant General Prem Nath Hoon PVSM AVSM SM
- Born: 4 October 1929; Abbottabad, North West Frontier Province, British India
- Died: 6 January 2020 (aged 90) Chandimandir, Haryana, India
- Allegiance: India
- Branch: Indian Army
- Service years: 1949–1987
- Rank: Lieutenant General
- Commands: Western Army
- Conflicts: Sino-Indian War; Indo-Pakistani War of 1965; Operation Meghdoot; Siachen conflict; Operation Brasstacks
- Awards: Param Vishisht Seva Medal; Ati Vishisht Seva Medal; Sena Medal
- Education: Indian Military Academy

Prem Nath Hoon (4 October 1929 – 6 January 2020) was an Indian military officer who was the General Officer Commander in Chief of the Western Army of the Indian Armed Forces from 1986 to 1987. He had commanded mountain brigades, infantry brigades, infantry division and the XV Corps in Kashmir.

He participated in the 1962 Sino-Indian War and the 1965 Indo-Pakistan War. In 1984, he led Operation Meghdoot, the Indian Armed Forces operation to capture the Siachen Glacier in the Kashmir region. He was also involved in Operation Brasstacks, the biggest military exercise since World War II.

== Biography ==
=== Early life ===
Prem Nath Hoon was born on 4 October 1929 in Abbottabad (now in Pakistan) in North West Frontier Province of British India. His father Pran Nath Hoon was a railway officer. He was associated with the Indian National Congress and participated in the Indian independence movement from 1936 to 1947.

=== Military career ===
Hoon joined the Indian Military Academy in Dehradun in 1947. He was commissioned in the Sikh Regiment and posted in Kashmir in various sectors from 1949 to 1961. He was posted at the Barahoti post during the 1962 Indo-China War. In 1965, during the Indo-Pakistan War, he fought in the Punjab, Sialkot and Pasrur sectors. He was promoted to the post of Lieutenant Colonel and moved to the Kargil sector in charge of Special Mountain Forces. In 1970, he was promoted to Brigadier and appointed to lead the Sikkim Brigade deployed at Nathu La. He was later posted at Hussainiwala in the Ferozpur sector in Punjab in 1974. He was made the Chief of staff of the Strike Corps in Chandimandir in 1980. He led the 13th Battalion of the Dogra Regiment.

In 1983, he was promoted to Lieutenant General. In 1984, he led the XV Corps and Operation Meghdoot, the Indian Armed Forces operation to capture the Siachen Glacier in the Kashmir region. From 1985 to 1987, he was the Director General Military Operations at Army Headquarters as well as Chief of Staff of the Western Command. He was later made General Officer Commander in Chief of Western Army from 1 October 1986 to 31 October 1987. During these years, he was also involved in Operation Brasstacks, the biggest military exercise since World War II. He retired in 1987.

=== Later life ===
After retirement, he was appointed as senior adviser to the textile company Birla VXL (now Digjam) from 1988 to 1990. He was appointed the Managing Director of Jiyajeerao Cotton Mills in Gwalior. Later he was involved in construction activities in Navi Mumbai from 1991 to 1998. In 1999, he published his memoir Unmasking Secrets Of Turbulence – Midnight Freedom To A Nuclear Dawn. He also published The Untold Truth in 2015 in which he claimed that the Indian military officers planned a coup to overthrow the Rajiv Gandhi led government. Air Marshal Randhir Singh rejected his claim and called it his "own perception". Colonel K. S. Pathak said that the military personnel in Delhi might have been mobilized for other reasons.

Prem Nath Hoon was associated with Shiv Sena and headed the ex-servicemen wing of the party from 1999 to 2005. He later ran a car dealership in Chandigarh. In 2013, he had joined the Bharatiya Janata Party.

Prem Nath Hoon died on 6 January 2020 in Command Hospital, Chandimandir following brain hemorrhage. His cremation rites were performed the next day at Sector 25 cremation ground in Chandigarh.

== Personal life ==
He had a son and a daughter.
