= Shailaja Kumar =

Indian alpine skier (born 1967)

Personal information
- Full name: Shailaja N Kumar
- Born: 17 January 1967 (age 59) Delhi, India

Skiing career
- Sport: Alpine skiing
- Disciplines: Slalom

Olympics
- Teams: 1 – (1988)
- Medals: 0

Shailaja Kumar (born 17 January 1967) is an Indian former alpine skier. She competed at the 1988 Winter Olympics. She is the first Indian woman to participate in the Winter Olympics. She is the daughter of the accomplished mountaineer, Colonel Narendra Kumar (mountaineer).

== Alpine skiing results ==
All results are sourced from the International Ski Federation (FIS).

=== Olympic results ===
Year
Year	Age	Slalom	Giant; Slalom	Super-G	Downhill	Combined	Team Event
1988	21	28	—	—	—	—	—

== See also ==
- India at the 1988 Winter Olympics
