= Oropolitics =

Use of mountaineering for political purposes

Oropolitics comes from the Greek oros meaning mountain and politikos meaning citizen. In modern usage it denotes the use of mountaineering for political purposes.

== Origin of term ==
The term "oropolitics" was coined by Joydeep Sircar in the early 1980s to describe the surreptitious efforts, first by Pakistan from the 1950s, and then by India from the late 1970s, to demonstrate control and ownership of the Siachen Glacier by allowing or organising mountaineering expeditions to the high peaks such as Saltoro Kangri and Teram Kangri flanking the glacier. The Siachen War of 1984 was the direct outcome of these 'oropolitical' activities. Another example is the Chinese publication Raising the Five Star Flag on Mount Tomur, an account of the successful Chinese expedition of 1977 to the Tien Shan peak better known by its Russian name as Pik Pobedy (nowadays renamed yet again by Kyrgyzstan as Jengish Chokusu). The Chinese volume seems to imply a first ascent and completely ignores multiple Russian ascents.

== Other examples ==
The strangest oropolitical events must surely be the unpublicised ascents of Nanda Devi and Nanda Kot by joint Indo-US expeditions in the 1960s to plant devices to monitor Chinese nuclear activity. The media disclosure in 1978 that an Indo-American covert expedition had planted a nuclear-fuelled monitoring device atop Nanda Kot in the 1960s, and that subsequently the device had disappeared, led to fears of radioactive contamination of the river Ganges, and a political brouhaha.

Recent examples of oropolitics, again from India, were the claimed ascent of Nyegyi Kangsang (7047 m) and the attempt on the nearby peak Kangto (7090 metres) by Indian teams in the 1990s. Both are remote Arunachal Pradesh peaks that are difficult to access, located on or very close to the India-China border. These were as much sporting activities as visible demonstrations of de facto control of India over terrain claimed by China. It has been suggested that the actual summit of Nyegyi Kangsang was not even reached.
