= Joydeep Sircar =

Indian explorer

Joydeep Sircar (born 1947) is a mountaineer and mountain historian. In 1979, he published his Himalayan Handbook, an index of all the-then named peaks of 6096 meters (20000 feet) and above in Afghanistan and the Indian subcontinent, giving chronological entries of expeditions up to 1975 to each peak with a brief summary of results and references to expedition reports, after a decade of solitary research. He was inspired in this formidable undertaking by the pronouncement of the late Soli S. Mehta, Hony. Local Secretary of The Himalayan Club, that the task had never been attempted before and was well-nigh impossible. This book, introduced by the famous British mountaineer-explorer J. O. M. Roberts, one of Sircar's idols, was the first one of its kind. Printed in 500 copies only, it received excellent international notices and became a basic reference resource.

In 1982, Sircar was the first to suspect and draw public attention to the covert competition between India and Pakistan over the Siachen Glacier and coined the term Oropolitics to describe the use of mountaineering expeditions as a cloak for establishing territorial claims. His essay on this topic was published in abbreviated form in an article in The Telegraph newspaper of Calcutta. The full essay titled "Oropolitics" came out in Himalaya Sameeksha, a limited circulation magazine published by Kamala Mukherjee in Calcutta, and was subsequently reprinted in the prestigious Alpine Journal of London in 1984.. India sent troops into the Siachen Glacier the same year.

Sircar surmised the existence of a feasible pass in Himachal Pradesh, India on the Himalayan divide between Kullu and Spiti Districts. He led three expeditions to the high range separating the Upper Parvati valley from the unexplored Debsa Glacier in 1992, 1993 and 1995. The Debsa Pass (5340 metres), named by him, was reached in 1993 and crossed on 21 September 1995, and the team descended the unexplored West Debsa Glacier and followed the Debsa stream to the Parahio Valley and from there to the Spiti Valley. The pass has become a regular route as it saves 2–3 days over the traditional Kullu-Spiti route by the Pin Parvati Pass (5319 metres).

Sircar has taken part in a number of other mountaineering expeditions, likes travelling to remote places, and is a poet, essayist, and wildlifer. He drew the attention of the Bombay Natural History Society in 2001 to the presence of large numbers of the endangered Bar-headed goose at Gharana Wetland Reserve, Jammu, which eventually led to this neglected sanctuary on the Indo-Pak border being classified as an Important Bird Area

He is also avidly interested in history and military matters, particularly aviation, and was the first to compose a brief biography of the World War II Beaufighter ace Flying Officer A.M.O. Pring, DFM , a childhood hero who flew and died in combat defending Calcutta from Japanese air attack and is buried at Calcutta. He followed this up with an expanded essay called Sergeant Pring and the Calcutta Hurricane in which an outline biography of Maurice Pring is combined with the pioneering study of a rare and little-known night-fighter, the Hawker Hurricane II C(NF) equipped with the pilot-operated AI Mark VI radar. Both essays have won praise from aviation cognoscenti. He has followed these pieces up with an article conclusively demonstrating that the Hurricane II C(NF) was, in fact, the first radar-equipped single-seater night-fighter.These essays came out in book form in 2021 in Sergeant Pring and the Calcutta Hurricane (ISBN 978-81-949542-2-4, published by The Browser, SCO 14-15, Sector 8-C, Chandigarh 160 009).

A selection of his English poetry is available in Poemhunter

In a recent article, Sircar has claimed to have solved the mystery of the Lake of No Return, Myanmar, which he visited in 2002.
