= Operation Meghdoot =

1984 Indian military operation in Kashmir

Coordinates: 35°25′N 76°55′E

- Part of the Siachen conflict
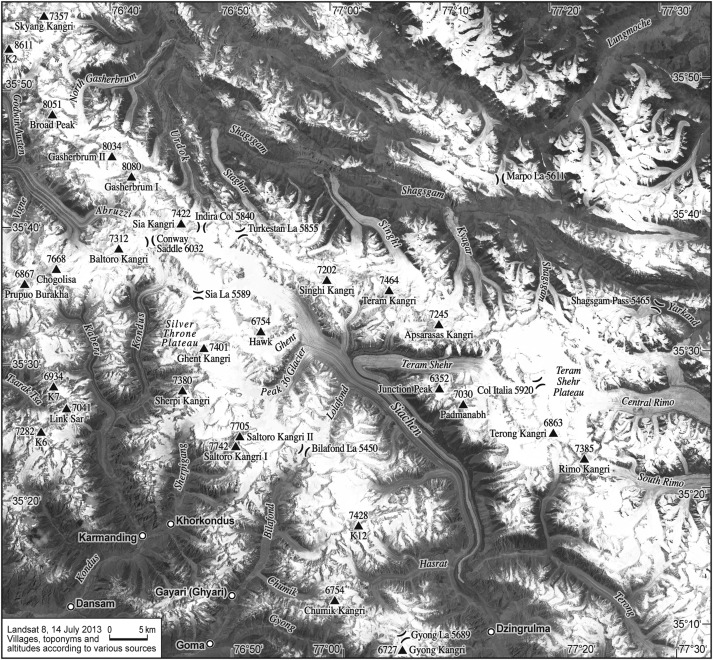
- Satellite imagery of the Siachen Glacier
Date	13 April 1984; 42 years ago
Location	Siachen Glacier, Ladakh
Result	Indian Victory
Territorial changes	India gains control of the entire Siachen Glacier, and administers it as part of Ladakh

Belligerents
India	Pakistan

Commanders and leaders
Giani Zail Singh (President of India); Lt Gen P N Hoon (GOC, XV Corps); Brig Vijay Channa (Commander, 26 Sector); Lt. Col. D K Khanna	Gen. Zia-ul-Haq (President of Pakistan); Lt. Gen. Zahid Ali Akbar (Commander, X Corps); Brig. Pervez Musharraf

Strength
3,000+	3,000+

Casualties and losses
Unknown	Unknown

Operation Meghdoot was the codename for an Indian Armed Forces operation launched in 1984 to preempt Pakistan's competing Operation Ababeel to take full control of the Siachen Glacier in Ladakh on the tri-junction of the India–Pakistan-China border in the Himalayas.

Even though Pakistan had conceived their Operation Ababeel in 1983, earlier than India, India preempted them in execution by launching Operation Meghdoot on the morning of 13 April 1984, four days earlier than Pakistan had planned to launch Operation Ababeel, resulting in Indian forces gaining control of almost the entire Siachen Glacier, considered in modern times to be the highest battleground in the world.

Currently, the Indian Army remains the first and only army in the world to have deployed tanks and other heavy ordnance at altitudes well over 5,000 meters. Up to ten infantry battalions each of the Indian Army and Pakistan Army are actively deployed at high altitudes of up to 6,400 meters throughout the region due to the present Siachen conflict.

== Background ==
=== India-Pakistan conflict and vague demarcation of LOC ===
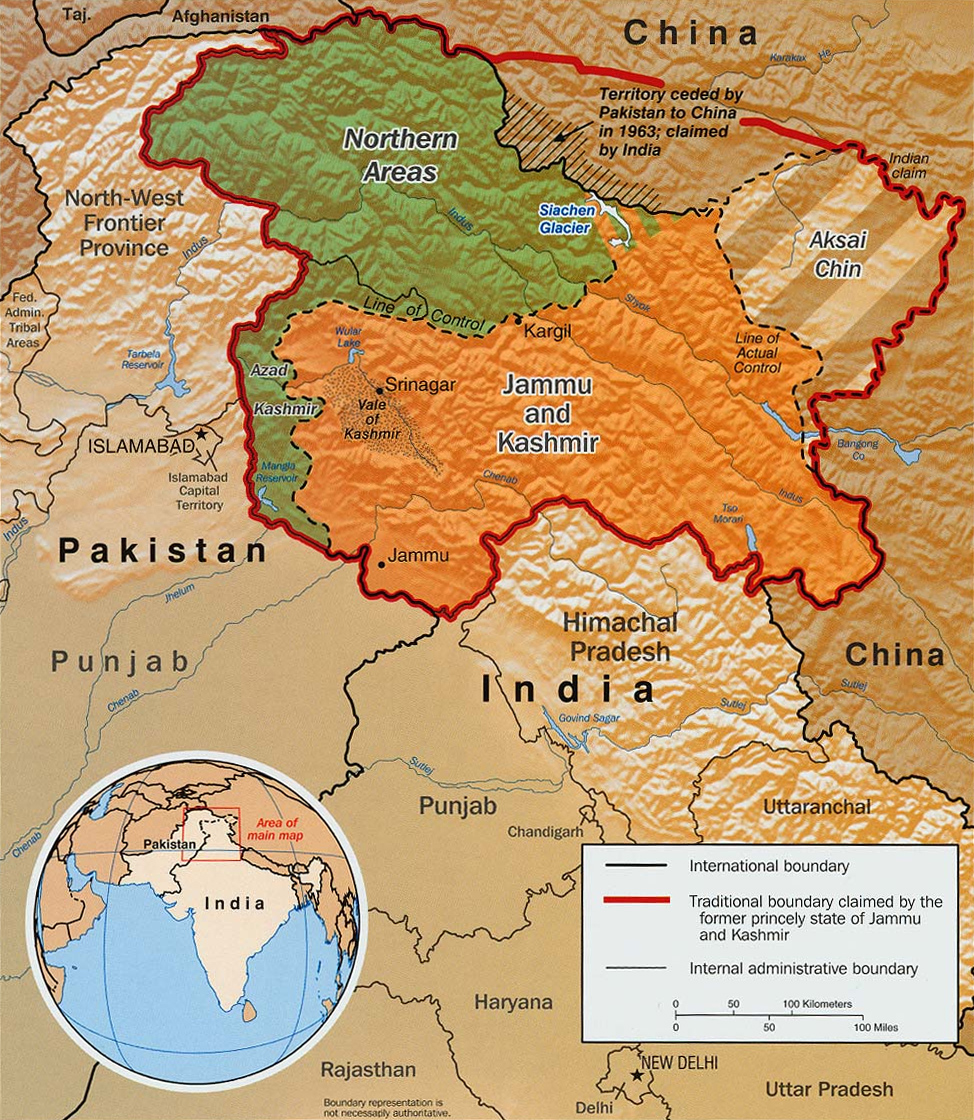
Trans-Karakoram Tract

In the context of the wider India Pakistan wars and conflicts, the Siachen Glacier became a bone of contention following a vague demarcation of territories in the Karachi Agreement of July 1949 which did not exactly specify who had authority over the Siachen Glacier area. India and Pakistan had demarcated the borders of the disputed area in Ladakh by demarcating the Line of Actual Control (LOC) which ended at the Point NJ9842 and the area further north of this which lies in Siachen was not demarcated. Indian interpretation was that Pakistan territory extended only to about the Saltoro Ridge, where the territorial line's route after the last demarcated Point NJ9842 was "thence north to the glaciers." Pakistan interpretation was that their territory continued northeast from Point NJ9842 to the Karakoram Pass. As a result, both nations claimed the Siachen Glacier and the alpine heights around the Siachen Glacier.

=== 1970s-80s: Pakistani permissions to foreigner's mountaineering expeditions in Siachen ===
In the 1970s and early 1980s, Pakistan permitted several mountaineering expeditions to climb the peaks in the Siachen region from the Pakistani side, perhaps in an attempt to reinforce their claim on the area as these expeditions received permits obtained from the Government of Pakistan and in many cases a liaison officer from the Pakistan Army accompanied the teams.

Notably, when Pakistan gave permission to a Japanese expedition to scale an important peak (Rimo I) in 1984, it further fueled the suspicion of the Indian Government of Pakistani attempts to legitimize their claim. The peak, located east of the Siachen Glacier, also overlooks the northwestern areas of the Aksai Chin, an area which is disputed between India and China. The Indian military believed that such an expedition could further link up the northeastern side to the southwestern side of the Karakoram Range and eventually provide a strategic, if not tactical, advantage to Pakistan.

=== 1978-early 1980s: Indian mountaineering expeditions to Siachen ===
In 1978, the Indian Army also allowed mountaineering expeditions to the glacier, approaching from its side. The first one launched in 1978 by Colonel Narinder Kumar of the Indian Army, who led an expedition to Teram Kangri, along with medical officer Captain AVS Gupta and S.C Vahie. The Indian Air Force provided valuable logistics support to this expedition and supply of fresh rations. The first air landing on the glacier was carried out on 6 October 1978 when two casualties were evacuated from the Advance Base Camp in a Chetak helicopter by Squadron Leader Monga and Flying Officer Manmohan Bahadur.

In 1980, the Commander of 3 Artillery Brigade, Brigadier K N Thadani VSM, led a 68-member Indian Army military expedition (consisting of 2 Majors, 5 Captains, 1 Second Lieutenant and 59 Other Ranks of the army) to Apsarasas-1 a part of the Apsarasas Kangri sub-range in the Siachen Glacier, Ladakh. On 18 September 1980, 16 members of the Indian Army expedition successfully scaled the summit. Then in 1984, Lieutenant Colonel Prem Chand, of the Dogra Regiment led a 54-member Indian Army military expedition (consisting of Officers and Other Ranks of the army) to K12 on the Saltoro Range in the Siachen Glacier, Ladakh. On 17 October 1984, members of the Indian Army expedition successfully summited the peak.

== Pakistani strategy ==
Operation Ababeel, conceived in 1983, was the code-name for a military operation planned by the Pakistani Armed Forces to capture the Siachen Glacier in the disputed Kashmir region, precipitating the Siachen Conflict. The operation aimed to establish Pakistani control over key points on the Siachen Glacier and the Saltoro Ridge, but it was preempted by India’s Operation Meghdoot, resulting in its failure.

=== Planning ===
The planning phase of Operation Ababeel was finalized by late 1983, with the operation scheduled for early 1984. The Pakistani military intended to launch the operation in May 1984, as the harsh winter conditions of the Siachen Glacier made earlier deployment challenging. The Pakistani force was code named Burzil Force, comprising Special Services Group (SSG) commandos and other units, was to be deployed from Skardu with ground-based commando tactics, leveraging Pakistan’s gravel road access to the Saltoro Range for rapid troop movement.

The conception of Operation Ababeel began in 1983, when Pakistani military planners, based at General Headquarters (GHQ) in Rawalpindi, identified the strategic importance of the Siachen Glacier. Intelligence reports indicated that India was conducting mountaineering expeditions in the region, raising concerns that India might assert control over the undemarcated territory beyond the Line of Control (LoC) point NJ9842, as per the 1949 Karachi Agreement. After analyzing the Indian Army's mountaineering expeditions, they feared that India might capture key ridges and mountain passes near the glacier, and decided to send their own troops first. Pakistan’s decision to launch Operation Ababeel was driven by the need to preempt Indian control and secure key passes, particularly on the Saltoro Ridge, which overlooks the Siachen Glacier. Pakistani generals, including then-Brigadier Pervez Musharraf, began planning the operation after confirming Indian patrols in the Siachen area. The plan involved the capture of strategic heights on the Saltoro Ridge on the western flank of Siachen Glacier, including passes like Bilafond La and Sia La, at altitudes up to 16,000 ft (4,877 m).

In mid-1983, Pakistan ordered Arctic-weather gear from a London supplier, inadvertently alerting India, as the same supplier provided equipment to the Indian Army. This procurement was a key indicator of Pakistan’s intent to launch a high-altitude operation. Indian intelligence agencies upon further investigation reported mass leave cancellations at the offices of Pakistan's Forces Command Northern Areas, Pakistani troop movement towards Khapalu, laying of new communication lines beyond Skardu and further procurement of high altitude and extreme cold weather equipment and clothing from European manufacturers by Pakistan. Pakistanis also laid a formal claim to the entire region to the west of peak NJ 9842 and the Karakoram Pass. The operation was set to commence around May 1st 1984 with early reconnaissance to be undertaken by April 17, as the commanding officer of Pakistan’s Forces Command Northern Areas (FCNA) declined to deploy troops during winter due to lack of operational experience in such conditions.

== Indian response ==
=== Conceptualisation of Operation Meghdoot ===
During mid-winter of 1983, an Indian Long Range Patrol codenamed-Polar Bear II and a Pakistani Special Service Group (SSG) came face to face on Bilafond La during routine patrols. Alerted to this, the Indian Army began preparations for action in January 1984 and all plans were tactically evaluated on 26th March 1984 when the Indian forces conducted mock exercise codenamed Walnut Cracker. Conducted at multiple Corps Headquarters in Srinagar, the exercise simulated joint combat in the event if needed to dislodge Pakistani forces in Siachen. IAF Helicopters also began conducting reconnaissance in the area from early April 1984. The Indian Army decided to deploy further troops from the northern Ladakh region as well as some paramilitary forces to the glacier area. Most of the troops had been acclimatized to the extremities of the glacier through a training expedition to Antarctica in 1982 before eventually launching the operation to occupy the complete glacier.

Operation Meghdoot was led by Lieutenant General P N Hoon. The task of occupying the Saltoro ridge was given to the Commander of 26 Sector, Brigadier Vijay Channa, who was tasked with launching the operation between 10 and 30 April.The Indian forces aimed to preempt the Pakistani Army by about 4 days, as intelligence had reported that the Pakistani operation planned to survey parts of the glacier by 17 April. Lieutenant General P N Hoon chose 13 April, as it was Vaisakhi, and the Pakistanis would be least expecting the Indians to launch an operation and for the fact that it signified the raising day of 1 JAK Rifles, who were to lead the engagements. The final approval was granted by Prime Minister Indira Gandhi after the Army brass gave a detailed presentation about the operation to the then Defence Minister R. Venkataraman. The preparations for Operation Meghdoot started with the airlift of troops and supplies by the Indian Air Force to the base of the glacier area. IAF MiG-23s were also deployed over Kashmir, to provide air cover for Indian forces.

=== Execution ===
The Indian Army planned the operation to control the glacier by 13 April 1984, to preempt the Pakistani Army by about 4 days, as intelligence had reported that the Pakistani operation planned to start sending their forces by 17 April to occupy the glacier. The first phase of the operation began in March 1984, a battalion of the Kumaon Regiment under the command of Lt Col D K Khanna and units of the Ladakh Scouts, marched on foot with full battle packs through a snow bound Zoji La for days to avoid detection. The first unit led by Major R S Sadhu was tasked with establishing a position on the heights of the glacier. The next unit led by Captain Sanjay Kulkarni and Second Lieutenant Anant Bhuyan secured Bilafond La. The remaining units led by Captain P V Yadav moved forward and climbed for four days to secure the remaining heights of the Saltoro Ridge. By the end of the day approximately 300 Indian troops were dug into the critical peaks and passes of the glacier.

By the time Pakistan's advanced reconnaissance troops managed to get to the Saltoro Ridge area on 17 April 1984, for the full launch of Operation Ababeel on 1 May 1984, they found that the Indian Army had control over all major mountain passes of Sia La, Bilafond La and Gyong La and all the commanding heights of the Saltoro Ridge west of the Siachen Glacier. Handicapped by the altitude and the limited time, Pakistan could only manage to control the Saltoro Ridge's western slopes and foothills; despite the fact that Pakistan possessed more ground accessible routes to the area, unlike Indian access which was largely reliant on air drops for supplies due to the steeper eastern side of the glacier.

== Outcome ==
Operation Ababeel failed to materialize as planned due to India’s preemptive Operation Meghdoot, launched on April 13, 1984. Indian intelligence, including inputs from the Research and Analysis Wing (RAW) station chief in Srinagar, Vikram Sood, alerted the Indian Army to Pakistan’s plans. The Indian troops, led by the Kumaon Regiment and Ladakh Scouts, secured the Siachen Glacier and the Saltoro Ridge, including key passes like Bilafond La, Sia La, and Gyong La, just 48 hours before Pakistan’s intended launch. This rendered Pakistan’s plan unfeasible, as Indian forces established control over the glacier and its approaches. Pakistan’s Burzil Force was unable to execute the planned assault, and Pakistani troops instead liberated positions surrounding Indian posts, leading to a stalemate where both sides maintained high-altitude deployments within shooting range. The Indian Army advance by then controlled 985.71 sq mi (2,553.0 km^{2}) of its own territory. Camps were soon converted into permanent posts by both countries. Operation Ababeel was effectively abandoned as a result of India’s decisive action.

=== Casualties ===
No reliable data is available on the number of casualties on both sides during this particular operation. Both sides incurred most of their casualties from the weather and the terrain; and avalanches and crevasses during patrols.The operation and the continued cost of maintaining logistics to the area is a major drain on both militaries.

== Aftermath ==
=== Strategic Indian control ===
The operation resulted in India gaining the 70 kilometers long Siachen Glacier and all of its tributary glaciers, as well as the three main passes on the Saltoro Ridge immediately west of the glacier; Sia La, Bilafond La, and Gyong La. Thus, giving India the tactical advantage of holding higher grounds. The AGPL runs roughly along the Saltoro Ridge which extends nearly 120 kilometers from Point NJ9842 to the Shaksgam Tract (a part of Gilgit-Baltistan; which Pakistan had ceded to China in 1963). The Indian Army advance now controlled 985.71 sq mi (2,553.0 km^{2}) of territory. Base camps were soon converted into permanent posts by both countries.

=== Further conflict ===
Pakistan launched an all-out assault in 1987 and again in 1989 to capture the ridge and passes held by India. The first assault was headed by Pervez Musharraf (then a Brigadier) and initially managed to capture a few high points before being pushed back. In November 1986, Pakistani Captain Akmal Khan taking advantage of bad weather established a Pakistani military post on a dominating feature called "Left Shoulder" of the Bilafond La area which they named as the Quaid post in honour of their leader Quaid-e-Azam Muhammad Ali Jinnah, at higher elevation than twin Indian posts, Amar and Sonam posts, with both Indian posts being in the direct line of fire of Pakistani Qauid Post. The Quaid Post was manned by soldiers of the Shaheen Company (3rd commando battalion), a part of Pakistan's Special Services Group. It was commanded by Subedar Ataullah Mohammed. Later the same year, as a consequence of India's counter-operation in Operation Rajiv, Quaid Post came under Indian control as Bana Post, in recognition of Bana Singh who launched a daylight attack after climbing 1,500 ft (460 m) of ice cliffs. Bana Singh was awarded the Param Vir Chakra–the highest gallantry award of India for the assault that captured the post.

Bana Post is at present the highest battlefield post in the world at a height of 22,143 feet (6,749 m) above sea level. During 1988 Pakistani forces made repeated attempts to take Bana Post, during their last attempt to take this key post on 9 May 1988 they fixed four ropes and a ladder system on the ice wall below the post. The attack was unsuccessful, but the ropes and ladder system fixed by Pakistanis remained in position, making it possible for them to be used again in fresh attempts to take the post. On 18 May 1988 Indians cut two of the four. On 26 May 1988, the Observation Post Officer, Captain Pratap Singh of 75 Medium Regiment was killed by a grenade while removing the ladder.

Further hostilities ceased after the Indian force's victory at the Battle of Bahadur Post, which gave India complete control over large parts of Siachen.In 1999, the area also saw action during the Pakistan army Operation Badr and Indian force's counter-attack during Operation Vijay and Operation Safed Sagar during the Kargil War.

== In popular media ==
- Books
  - Beyond NJ 9842: The Siachen Saga
  - Meghdoot: The Beginning of the Coldest War
- TV documentary
  - Operation Meghdoot: How India Captured Siachen (Battle Ops) (2018) is a TV documentary which premièred on the Discovery Channel's Veer by Discovery series, Battle Ops.

== See also ==
- Borders
  - Actual Ground Position Line (AGPL)
  - India–Pakistan International Border (IB)
  - Line of Control (LoC)
  - Line of Actual Control (LAC)
  - Sir Creek (SC)
  - Borders of China
  - Borders of India
  - Borders of Pakistan
- Conflicts
  - Kashmir conflict
  - Siachen conflict
  - Sino-Indian conflict
- Disputed territories
  - List of disputed territories of China
  - List of disputed territories of India
  - List of disputed territories of Pakistan
  - Northern Areas
  - Trans-Karakoram Tract
  - Sino-Pakistan Agreement for transfer of Trans-Karakoram Tract to China
- List of extreme points of India
