= List of flag bearers for India at the Olympics =

India at the Olympics
- IOC code: IND
- NOC: Indian Olympic Association
- Website: www.olympic.ind.in
- Medals: Gold 10 Silver 10 Bronze 21 Total 41

Summer appearances
- 1900; 1904–1912; 1920; 1924; 1928; 1932; 1936; 1948; 1952; 1956; 1960; 1964; 1968; 1972; 1976; 1980; 1984; 1988; 1992; 1996; 2000; 2004; 2008; 2012; 2016; 2020; 2024

Winter appearances
- 1964; 1968; 1972–1984; 1988; 1992; 1994; 1998; 2002; 2006; 2010; 2014; 2018; 2022; 2026

Other related appearances
- Independent Olympic Participants (2014)

This is a list of flag bearers who have represented India at the Olympics. Flag bearers carry the national flag of their country at the opening ceremony of the Summer and Winter Olympic Games.

Men and women from across the country and from a variety of sports have been chosen to bear the flag at the opening ceremonies. Field hockey player Balbir Singh Sr. and Luge runner Shiva Keshvan are the only athletes who have been given the honour on more than one occasion. Balbir Singh Sr. was given this honour twice in 1952 and 1956 Summer Olympics, while Shiva Keshavan led the Indian contingent four times in 1998, 2002, 2010 and 2018 Winter Olympics. In the 1992 Summer Olympics, Shiny Wilson became the first woman to carry the flag of India at the opening ceremony of any Olympics. The first female flag bearer at the Winter Olympics was Neha Ahuja at the 2006 Winter Olympics.

== List of flag bearers ==
=== Summer Olympics ===
Event year	Flag bearer	Sport
1920	Purma Bannerjee	Athletics
1932	Lal Shah Bhokhari	Field hockey
1936	Dhyan Chand	Field hockey
1948	Talimeran Ao	Football
1952	Balbir Singh, Sr	Field hockey
1956	Balbir Singh, Sr	Field hockey
1964	Gurbachan Singh Randhawa	Athletics
1972	D. N. Devine Jones	Boxing
1984	Zafar Iqbal	Field hockey
1988	Kartar Singh	Wrestling
1992	Shiny Wilson	Athletics
1996	Pargat Singh	Field hockey
2000	Leander Paes	Tennis
2004	Anju Bobby George	Athletics
2008	Rajyavardhan Singh Rathore	Shooting
2012	Sushil Kumar	Wrestling
2016	Abhinav Bindra	Shooting
2020	Mary Kom Manpreet Singh	Boxing Hockey
2024	Sharath Kamal PV Sindhu	Table tennis Badminton

=== Winter Olympics ===
Event year	Flag bearer	Sport
1964	Jeremy Bujakowski	Alpine skiing
1968	Jeremy Bujakowski	Alpine skiing
1988	Kishor Rahtna Rai	Alpine skiing
1998	Shiva Keshavan	Luge
2002	Shiva Keshavan	Luge
2006	Neha Ahuja	Alpine skiing
2010	Shiva Keshavan	Luge
2018	Shiva Keshavan	Luge
2022	Arif Khan	Alpine skiing

== See also ==
- India at the Olympics
