= India at the 2010 Winter Olympics =

- Flag of India
- IOC code: IND
- NOC: Indian Olympic Association
- Website: olympic.ind.in

in Vancouver, Canada 12–28 February 2010
- Competitors: 3 (3 men and 0 women) in 3 sports
- Flag bearer (opening): Shiva Keshavan
- Flag bearer (closing): Tashi Lundup
- Medals: Gold 0 Silver 0 Bronze 0 Total 0

Winter Olympics appearances (overview)
- 1964; 1968; 1972–1984; 1988; 1992; 1994; 1998; 2002; 2006; 2010; 2014; 2018; 2022; 2026

Other related appearances
- Independent Olympic Participants (2014)

Three athletes from India participated in the 2010 Winter Olympics in Vancouver, Canada, held between 12 and 28 February 2010. The country's participation in Vancouver marked its eighth appearance at the Winter Olympics since its debut in 1964. (Note: The first medals for alpinism were awarded at closing ceremony of the 1924 Winter Olympics in Chamonix, to the members of the unsuccessful 1922 British Mount Everest expedition led by Charles Granville Bruce. The medals were awarded to 21 people: the thirteen British expedition members, seven Indian Sherpas who died during the ascent and one Nepalese soldier. As the medal was awarded to a team of players of various nationalities, the International Olympic Committee recognizes it as a medal awarded to the mixed team rather than any individual nation.)

The India team consisted of skiers Jamyang Namgial and Tashi Lundup apart from luger Shiva Keshavan. Keshavan was the country's flag-bearer during the opening ceremony. None of them won a medal, and as of these Games, India had not earned a Winter Olympic medal. Lundup served as the flag-bearer during the closing ceremony.

== Background ==
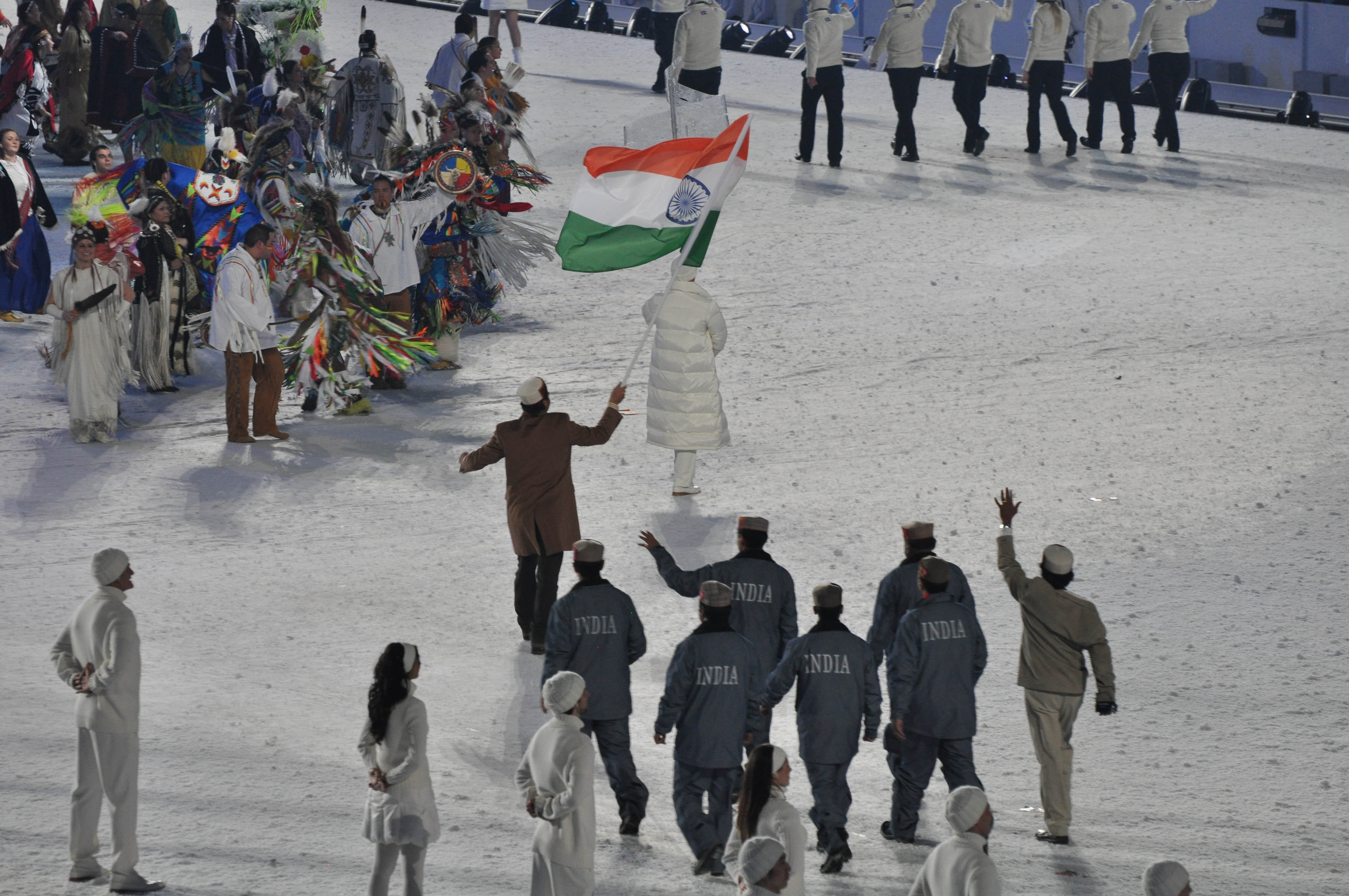
The Indian athletes during the parade in the opening ceremony

The Indian Olympic Association was recognized by the International Olympic Committee in 1927. However, by this time, they had already competed in three Summer Olympic Games, in 1900, 1920, and 1924. The nation made its first Winter Olympics appearance until the 1964 Winter Olympics held in Innsbruck, Austria. This edition of the Games marked the nation's eighth appearance at the Winter Olympics.

The Indian delegation consisted of chef de mission R. K. Gupta and three athletes. Luger Shiva Keshavan was the country's flag-bearer during the opening ceremony. Keshavan stated that the uniforms given to the athletes for the opening ceremony were of poor quality and sought Gupta's resignation citing his inability to satisfy the needs of the athletes. Following Keshavan's comments, the Indo-Canadian community in Vancouver donated money and procured uniforms for the Indian contingent. A local radio station raised US$6400 and a sports shop donated track suits for the opening ceremony. In addition to the aid from the Indian sports ministry, the athletes received aid from various private sponsors for participation in the Games. Skier Tashi Lundup also served as the flag-bearer during the closing ceremony.

== Competitors ==
Three Indian athletes competed in the event – alpine skier Jamyang Namgial, cross country skier Tashi Lundup, and luger Shiva Keshavan.

Sport	Men	Women	Total
Alpine skiing	1	0	1
Cross-country skiing	1	0	1
Luge	1	0	1
Total	3	0	3

== Alpine skiing ==
The basic qualification mark for the alpine skiing events stipulated an average of less than 140 points in the list published by the International Ski Federation (FIS) as of 18 January 2010 for competitors ranked outside the top 100. The quotas were allocated further based on athletes satisfying other criteria, with a maximum of 22 athletes (maximum of 14 male or 14 female athletes) from a single participating NOC with not more than four participants in a single event.

Indian skier Jamyang Namgial achieved the basic qualification mark to qualify for the Men's giant slalom event. He belonged to the Ladakh Scouts of the Indian Army and was part of the High Altitude Warfare School (HAWS) run by the Army.

=== Main event ===
The main event was held on 19 February 2010 at the Whistler Olympic Park and marked Namgial's first and only participation in the Winter Olympic Games. Namgial completed his first run in 1:46.77. He took slightly longer to complete the course in the second run at 1:48.15. With a combined time of 3:34.92, he finished last amongst the classified finishers (81st among 89 competitors) in the overall classification.

Athlete	Event	Final			
Athlete	Event	Run 1	Run 2	Total	Rank
Jamyang Namgial	Men's giant slalom	1:46.77	1:48.15	3:34.92	81

== Cross-country skiing ==
=== Qualification ===
As per the "A" standard, athletes with a maximum of 100 distance points were allowed to compete in both the sprint and distance events. Athletes with a maximum of 120 sprint points were allowed to compete in the sprint event. They were also allowed to compete in the distance event provided that their distance points did not exceed 300. NOCs which did not have any athlete meeting the "A" standard were allowed to enter one competitor of each sex (known as the basic quota) in the sprint event or the distance event who satisfied the "B" standard of having a maximum of 300 distance points at the end of qualifying on 18 January 2010. A maximum of 20 athletes (maximum of 12 male or 12 female athletes) from a single participating NOC were allowed to compete and the remaining quotas were allocated further to athletes satisfying the "B" standard criteria from other NOCs.

Indian skier Tashi Ludup achieved the basic qualification mark to participate in the Men's 15 km classical distance event and was the first Indian to qualify for the cross country distance event. He also belonged to the Ladakh scouts of the Indian Army and was part of the HAWS.

=== Main event ===
The main event was held on 15 February 2010 at the Whistler Olympic Park and marked Lundup's first and only participation in the Winter Olympic Games. Lundup completed the 15 km (9.3 mi) course in 41:36.8. He finished the race in 83rd position (out of 96 competitors), more than eight minutes behind the winner Dario Cologna of Switzerland.

Athlete	Event	Final		
Athlete	Event	Time	Deficit	Rank
Tashi Lundup	15 kilometre freestyle	41:36.8	+ 8:00.5	83

== Luge ==
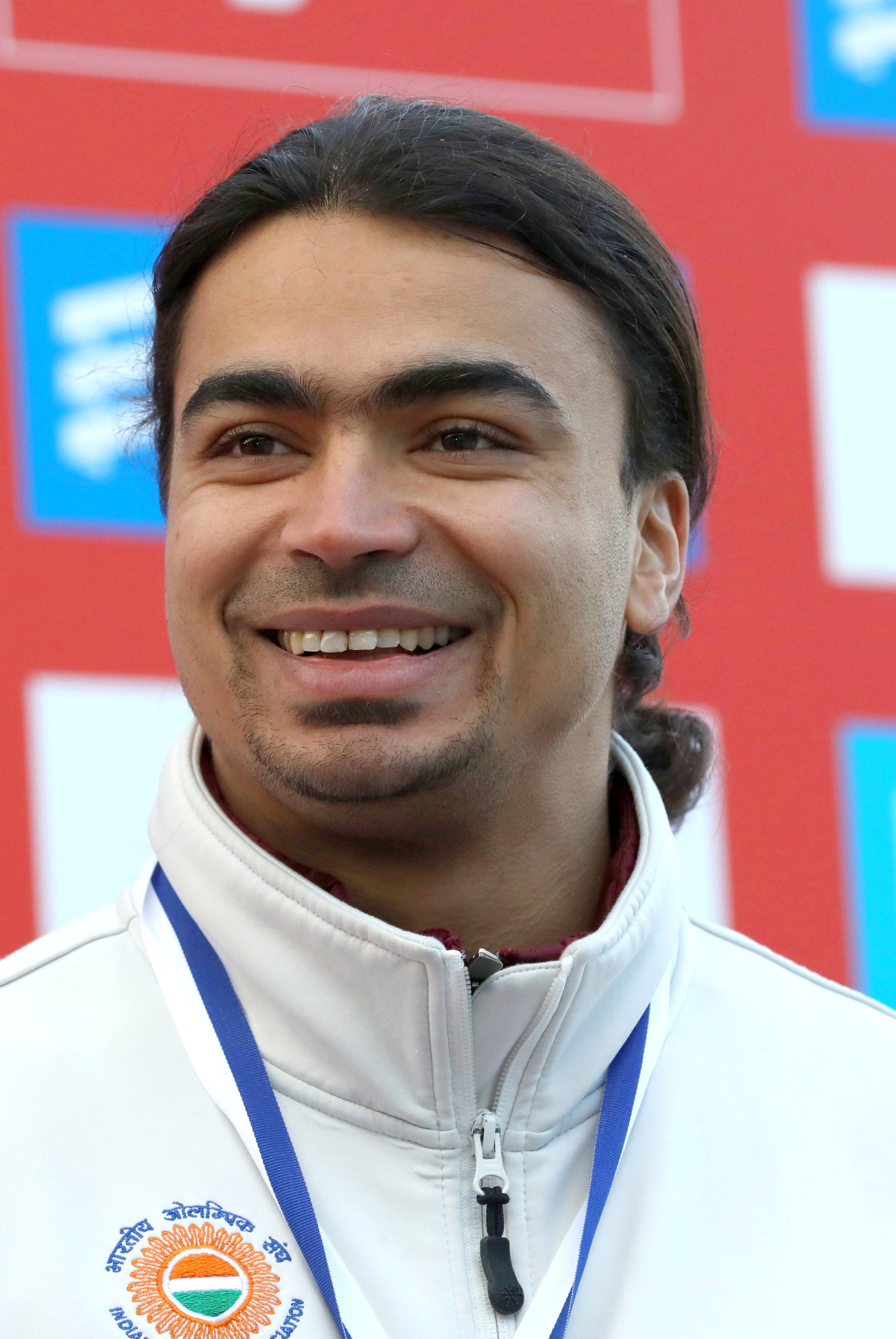
Shiva Keshavan qualified for the luge event for the fourth successive games

=== Qualification ===
The qualification was based on the cumulative world luge ranking points from 1 November 2009 to 31 December 2010 with a minimum requirement of having competed in five world cup events and having finished within the top 31 in any of the events. As per the qualification criteria, a maximum of 40 men were eligible for qualification. The top ranked athletes qualified directly with every nation limited to a maximum of three men. Further qualification spots were given to nations that had athletes who met the minimum standards and had not already qualified for the event. Shiva Keshavan was the only Indian to qualify for the event. Keshavan had represented India since 1997 and was the youngest ever men's luge competitor at the 1998 Nagano Olympics, where he finished 28th. He was also the sole Indian athlete to compete at the 2002 Winter Olympics and further represented India in the 2006 games.

Keshavan received a funding of US$ 20,000 from the Indian sports ministry after being awarded a bronze medal at the Asian Championships. Although Keshavan had represented his country thrice before, this was the first time he received any government support. He also received funding from private sponsors and a ₹0.45 million (US$5,300) contribution from five Indian lawyers to purchase a new luge for the competition after his previous luge broke during training in November.

=== Main event ===
This was Kesavan's fourth consecutive appearance at the Winter Olympic Games since he made his debut at the 1998 Nagano Olympics. The event was held on 13-14 February 2014 at the Whistler Sliding Centre. During training on 12 February 2010, Georgian luger Nodar Kumaritashvili was killed when he crashed at the last turn and hit a steel pole when going over speeds of 143 km/h (89 mph). As a result, the start of the men's single competition was revised to reduce speed and the wall at corner where Kumaritashvili crashed was raised.

In his first run, Keshavan clocked a time of 49.561, finishing 1.33 behind the leader Felix Loch. In the second run, he had his best run, clocking 49.529 to be ranked 28th amongst the 39 participants. In the penultimate run, he completed the circuit with a time of 49.786 to be ranked 29th. In the final attempt, he clocked 49.786 to finish with a total time of 3:18.473 and was classified in the 29th position out of the 39 athletes.

Athlete	Event	Final						
Athlete	Event	Run 1	Run 2	Run 3	Run 4	Total	Behind	Rank
Shiva Keshavan	Men's singles	49.561	49.529	49.597	49.786	3:18.473	+5.388	29
