= India at the 2006 Winter Olympics =

- IOC code: IND
- NOC: Indian Olympic Association
- Website: olympic.ind.in

in Turin
- Competitors: 4 (3 men, 1 woman) in 3 sports
- Flag bearers: Neha Ahuja (opening and closing)
- Medals: Gold 0 Silver 0 Bronze 0 Total 0

Winter Olympics appearances (overview)
- 1964; 1968; 1972–1984; 1988; 1992; 1994; 1998; 2002; 2006; 2010; 2014; 2018; 2022; 2026

Other related appearances
- Independent Olympic Participants (2014)

India sent a delegation to compete at the 2006 Winter Olympics in Turin, Italy from 10–26 February 2006. This was the nation's seventh appearance in a Winter Olympic Games. The Indian delegation consisted of four athletes, two in alpine skiing, one in cross-country skiing, and one in luge. Their best performance in any event was 25th by luger Shiva Keshavan in the men's singles.

== Background ==
The Indian Olympic Association was recognized by the International Olympic Committee on 31 December 1926. However, by this time, they had already competed in three Summer Olympic Games, in 1900, 1920, and 1924. India has participated in every Summer Olympics since 1920. The nation did not make its first Winter Olympics appearance until the 1964 Winter Olympics. With India missing the Winter Olympics from 1972 to 1984 and in 1994, Turin marked India's seventh appearance at a Winter Olympics. The 2006 Winter Olympics were held from 10–26 February; a total of 2,508 athletes representing 80 National Olympic Committees took part. The Indian delegation to Turin consisted of four athletes, two in alpine skiing, one in cross-country skiing, and one in luge. Alpine skier Neha Ahuja was the flag bearer for both the opening ceremony and the closing ceremony.

== Alpine skiing ==
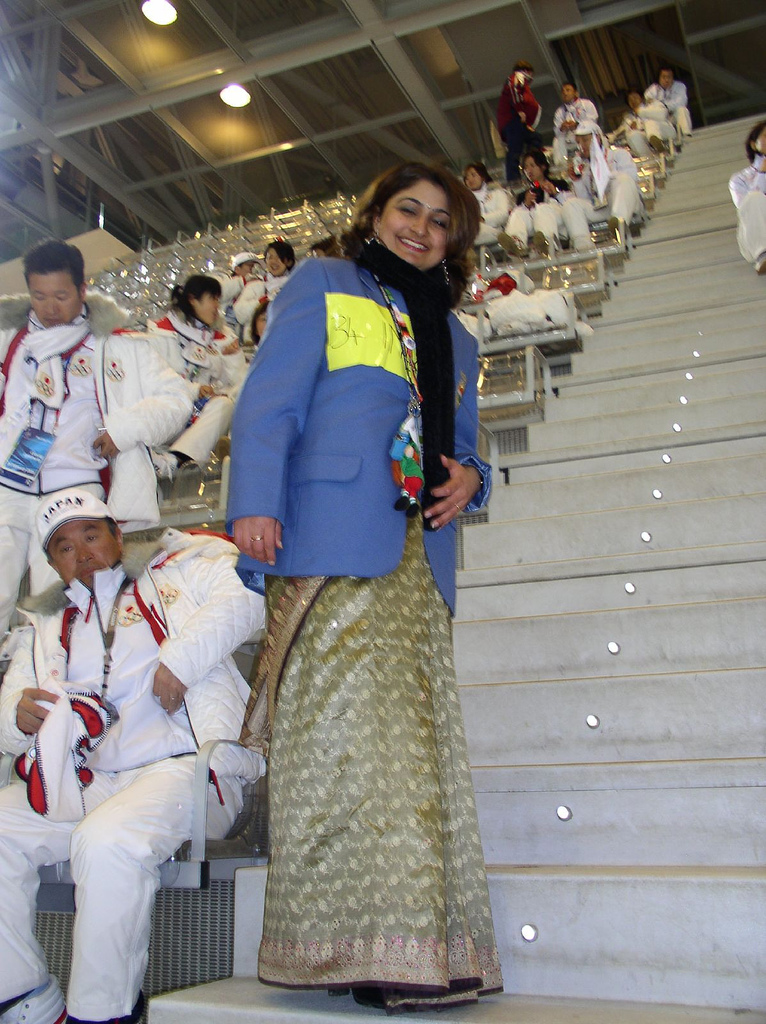
Neha Ahuja before the Opening Ceremonies of the 2006 Olympics

Neha Ahuja was 24 years old at the time of these Olympics, and was making her Olympic debut. On 22 February, she competed in the women's slalom, finishing her first run in 55.45 seconds, and her second in 1 minute and 0.71 seconds. Her combined time was 1 minute and 56.16 seconds, placing her last among the 51 competitors who finished both legs of the race; the gold medal was won by Sweden's Anja Pärson in 1 minute and 29.04 seconds; the silver was taken by Austrian Nicole Hosp and the bronze by her fellow Austrian Marlies Schild. On 24 February, Ahuja took part in the women's giant slalom, finishing her first run in 1 minute and 15.59 seconds and her second in 1 minutes and 25.72 seconds. Her total time was 2 minutes and 41.31 seconds, putting her in 42nd place out of 43 classified finishers. The gold medal was won by Julia Mancuso of the United States in 2 minutes and 9.19 seconds; the silver by Tanja Poutiainen of Finland, and the bronze was won by Swede Anna Ottosson.

Hira Lal was 25 years old at the time of the Turin Olympics, and was also making his Olympic debut. He competed in the men's giant slalom on 20 February, but did not finish the first run. The gold medal in this race was won by Benjamin Raich of Austria, the silver was taken by Joël Chenal of France, and the bronze was won by a second Austrian, Hermann Maier.

Athlete	Event	Final			
Athlete	Event	Run 1	Run 2	Total	Rank
Neha Ahuja	Women's giant slalom	1:15.59	1:25.72	2:41.31	42
Neha Ahuja	Women's slalom	55.45	1:00.71	1:56.16	51
Hira Lal	Men's giant slalom	did not finish			

== Cross-country skiing ==
Bahadur Gupta was 29 years old at the time of the Turin Olympics, and making his only Olympic appearance. In the qualifying round of the men's sprint on 22 February, he finished the race with a time of 2 minutes and 43.30 seconds, and he was 78th out of 80 competitors to finish. Only the top 30 qualified for the next round, and Gupta was eliminated, the slowest qualifying time was 2 minutes and 20.46 seconds. The gold medal was eventually won by Björn Lind of Sweden, the silver by Roddy Darragon of France, and the silver by Thobias Fredriksson, also of Sweden.

Athlete	Event	Qualifying		Quarterfinal		Semifinal		Final	
Athlete	Event	Total	Rank	Total	Rank	Total	Rank	Total	Rank
Bahadur Gupta	Men's sprint	2:43.30	78	Did not advance					78

== Luge ==
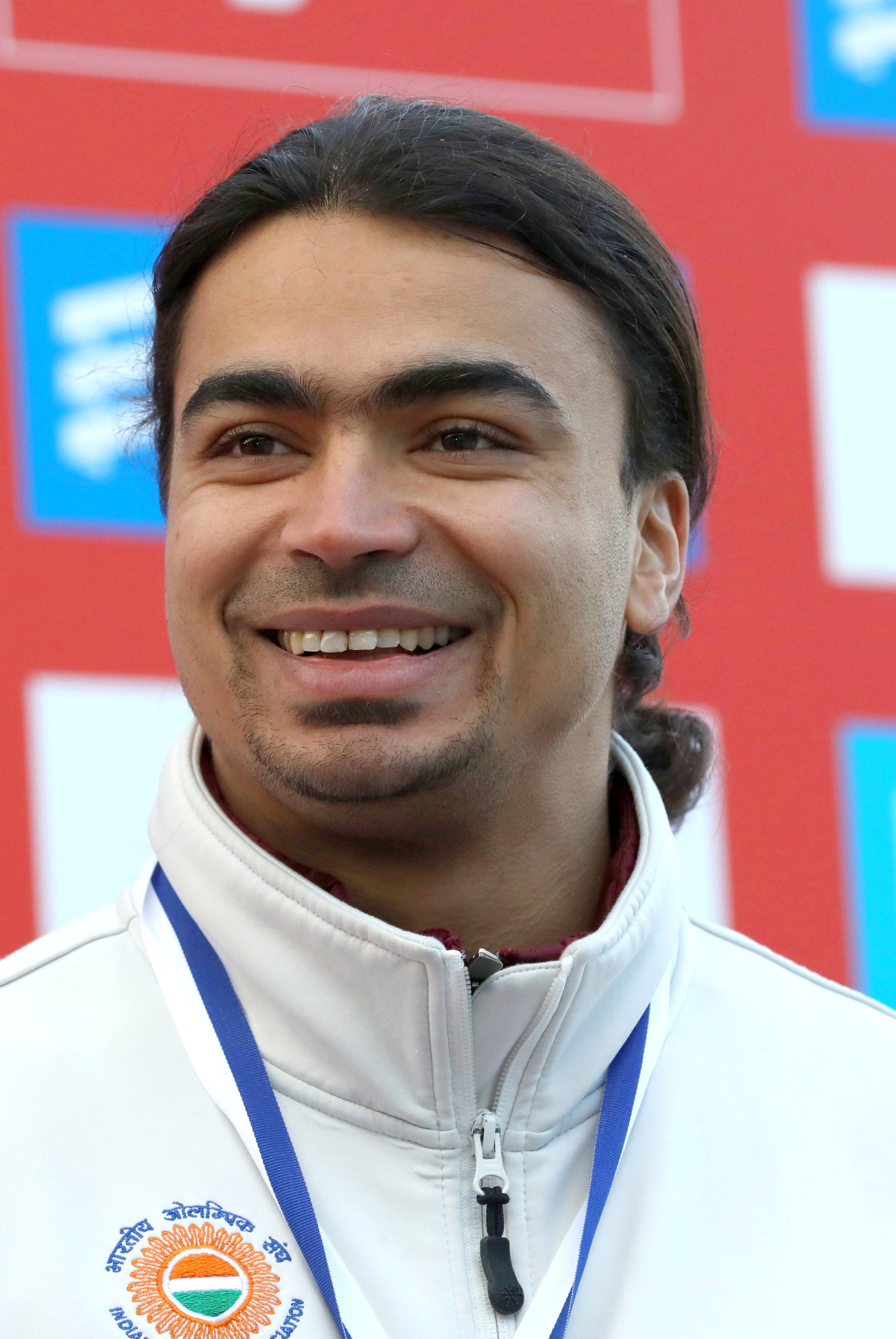
Shiva Keshavan made six Olympic appearances over his career.

Shiva Keshavan was 24 years old at the time of the Turin Olympics, and was making his third Olympic appearance, after representing India at the 1998 Nagano Olympics and the 2002 Salt Lake City Olympics. The men's singles was held on 11–12 February, and was held over four runs, two runs on each day. The final placement was determined by adding up all the run times for each athlete. On the first day, Keshavan finished the first run in a time of 53.729 seconds, and the second in 52.972 seconds. Overnight, he was in 29th place out of 36 competitors. The next day, he posted run times of 52.696 seconds and 52.540 seconds. Overall, the sum of his run times was 3 minutes and 31.937 seconds, which meant he finished in 25th place out of 35 lugers who completed all four runs. The gold medal was won by Armin Zöggeler of Italy in a time of 3 minutes and 26.088 seconds; the silver medal was taken by Albert Demchenko of Russia, and the bronze by Mārtiņš Rubenis of Latvia. Keshavan would go on to represent his country at the 2010, 2014, and the 2018 Winter Olympics.

Athlete	Event	Final					
Athlete	Event	Run 1	Run 2	Run 3	Run 4	Total	Rank
Shiva Keshavan	Men's singles	53.729	52.972	52.696	52.540	3:31.937	25
