= India at the 2002 Winter Olympics =

- IOC code: IND
- NOC: Indian Olympic Association
- Website: olympic.ind.in

in Salt Lake City
- Competitors: 1 (1 man) in 1 sport
- Flag bearer: Shiva Keshavan
- Medals: Gold 0 Silver 0 Bronze 0 Total 0

Winter Olympics appearances (overview)
- 1964; 1968; 1972–1984; 1988; 1992; 1994; 1998; 2002; 2006; 2010; 2014; 2018; 2022; 2026

Other related appearances
- Independent Olympic Participants (2014)

India competed at the 2002 Winter Olympics in Salt Lake City, United States, from 8 to 24 February 2002. The country's participation in Salt Lake City marked its sixth appearance at the Winter Olympics since its debut in 1964. (Note: The first medals for alpinism were awarded at closing ceremony of the 1924 Winter Olympics in Chamonix, to the members of the unsuccessful 1922 British Mount Everest expedition led by Charles Granville Bruce. The medals were awarded to 21 people: the thirteen British expedition members, seven Indian Sherpas who died during the ascent and one Nepalese soldier. As the medal was awarded to a team of players of various nationalities, the International Olympic Committee recognizes it as a medal awarded to the mixed team rather than any individual nation.)

The India team consisted of one male luger, Shiva Keshavan, who was the country's flag-bearer during the opening ceremony. He did not win a medal, and as of these Games, India had not earned a Winter Olympic medal.

== Background ==
The Indian Olympic Association was recognized by the International Olympic Committee in 1927. By this time, they had already competed in three Summer Olympic Games, in 1900, 1920, and 1924. The nation made its first Winter Olympics appearance at the 1964 Winter Olympics held in Innsbruck, Austria. This edition of the Games marked the nation's sixth appearance at the Winter Olympics.

The 2002 Winter Olympics was held in Salt Lake City, United States, between 8 and 24 February 2002. The Indian delegation consisted of a lone athlete Shiva Keshavan, who also served as the country's flag-bearer in the Parade of Nations during the opening ceremony. He did not win a medal, and as of these Games, India had not earned a Winter Olympic medal.

== Competitors ==
The Indian delegation consisted of a lone athlete Shiva Keshavan, who competed in luge.

Sport	Men	Women	Total
Luge	1	0	1
Total	1	0	1

== Luge ==
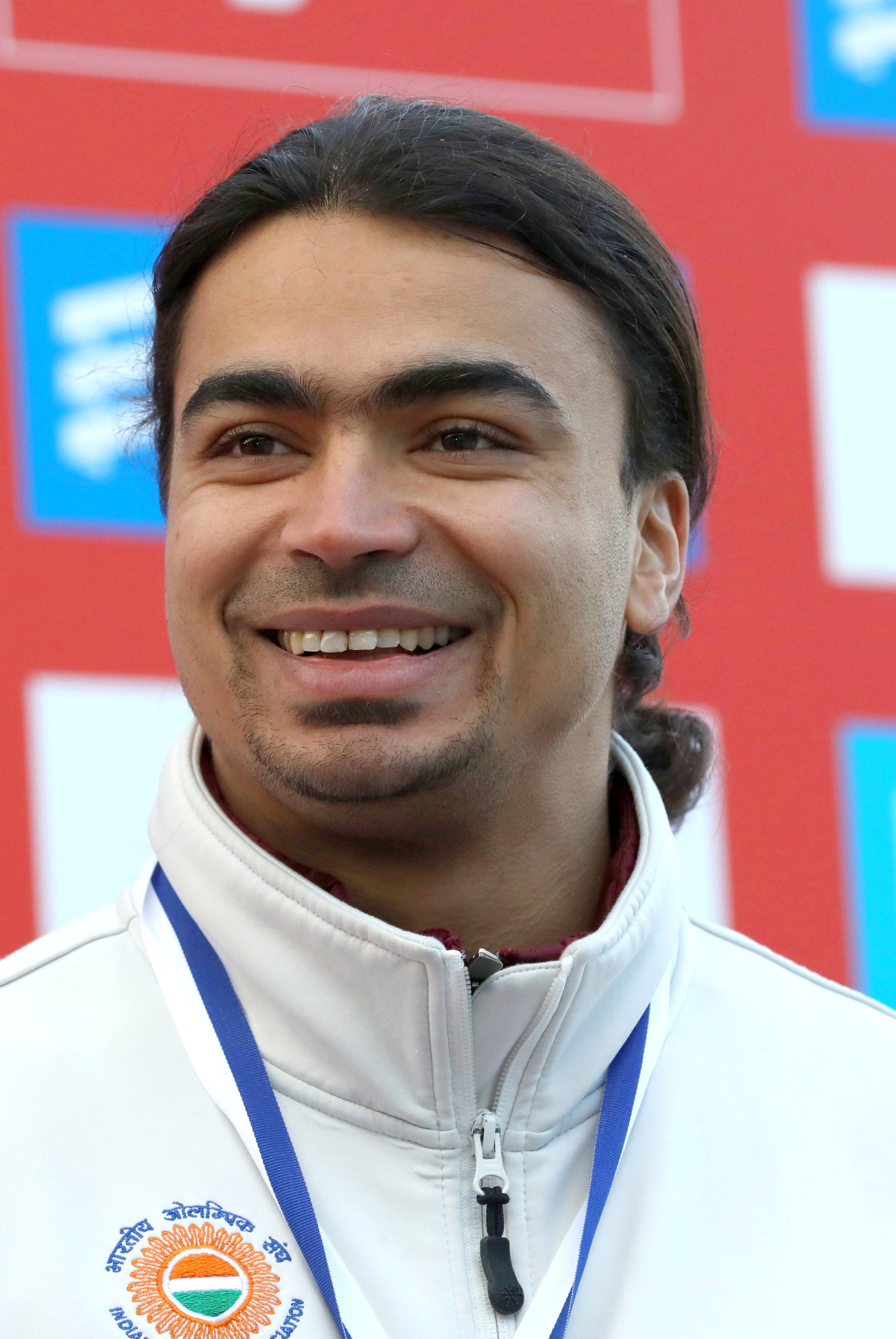
Shiva Keshavan was the only Indian participant in the Games.

Shiva Keshavan was the only Indian to qualify for the event. He had represented India since 1997 and was the youngest ever men's luge competitor at the 1998 Nagano Olympics, where he finished 28th. This was his second consecutive appearance at the Winter Olympic Games since he made his debut at the previous Olympics. He competed with a rented sled and money raised on his own as the Indian Olympic Association did not sponsor his participation.

The event was held from 10 to 11 February 2002 at the Utah Olympic Park in Park City. In his first run, Keshavan clocked a time of 45.881, finishing 1.335 behind the leader Armin Zöggeler. In the second run, he clocked 45.881 to be ranked 31st amongst the 50 participants. In the third run, he completed the circuit with the time of 46.700 to be ranked 40th. He performed better than the previous run in the final attempt, finishing 36th with a time of 46.425. Keshavan was classified in the 33rd position with a total time of 3:04.983 and finished more than seven seconds behind the gold medalist Zöggeler.

Athlete	Run 1		Run 2		Run 3		Run 4		Total	
Athlete	Time	Rank	Time	Rank	Time	Rank	Time	Rank	Time	Rank
Shiva Keshavan	45.881	27	45.977	31	46.700	40	46.425	36	3:04.983	33
