= India at the 2018 Winter Olympics =

- Flag of India
- IOC code: IND
- NOC: Indian Olympic Association
- Website: olympic.ind.in

in Pyeongchang, South Korea 9–25 February 2018
- Competitors: 2 (2 men) in 2 sports
- Flag bearer (opening): Shiva Keshavan
- Flag bearer (closing): Volunteer
- Medals: Gold 0 Silver 0 Bronze 0 Total 0

Winter Olympics appearances (overview)
- 1964; 1968; 1972–1984; 1988; 1992; 1994; 1998; 2002; 2006; 2010; 2014; 2018; 2022; 2026

Other related appearances
- Independent Olympic Participants (2014)

India participated at the 2018 Winter Olympics in Pyeongchang, South Korea, held between 9 and 25 February 2018. The country's participation in Pyeongchang marked its tenth appearance at the Winter Olympics since its debut in 1964. (Note: The first medals for alpinism were awarded at closing ceremony of the 1924 Winter Olympics in Chamonix, to the members of the unsuccessful 1922 British Mount Everest expedition led by Charles Granville Bruce. The medals were awarded to 21 people: the thirteen British expedition members, seven Indian Sherpas who died during the ascent and one Nepalese soldier. As the medal was awarded to a team of players of various nationalities, the International Olympic Committee recognizes it as a medal awarded to the mixed team rather than any individual nation.) (Note: An Indian athlete entered the 2014 Winter Olympics as Independent Olympic Participants as the Indian Olympic Association was suspended during the time. The suspension was revoked when the Games were underway and two other competitors competed under the Indian flag.)

The Indian team consisted of alpine skier Jagadish Singh and luger Shiva Keshavan, who was the country's flag-bearer during the opening ceremony. Both of them did not win a medal, and as of these Games, India had not earned a Winter Olympic medal. A volunteer served as the flag-bearer during the closing ceremony.

== Background ==
The Indian Olympic Association was recognized by the International Olympic Committee in 1927. However, by this time, they had already competed in three Summer Olympic Games, in 1900, 1920, and 1924. The nation made its first Winter Olympics appearance at the 1964 Winter Olympics held in Innsbruck, Austria. This edition of the Games marked the nation's tenth appearance at the Winter Olympics.

The 2018 Winter Olympics were held in Pyeongchang, South Korea between 9 and 25 February 2018. The Indian delegation consisted of six members which included chef de mission Harjinder Singh and two athletes, alpine skier Jagadish Singh and luger Shiva Keshavan. There was a conflict between the Indian Olympic Association and Singh's employer Indian Army as to who would accompany him to the Games, which resulted in a travel delay. On 9 February, Singh traveled to Pyeongchang along with his coach, Olympic-skier Nadeem Iqbal.

Keshavan was the country's flag-bearer during the opening ceremony. A volunteer served as the flag-bearer during the closing ceremony. India did not win a medal, and as of these Games, had not earned a Winter Olympic medal.

== Competitors ==
| Sport | Men | Women | Total |
|---|---|---|---|
| Cross-country skiing | 1 | 0 | 1 |
| Luge | 1 | 0 | 1 |
| Total | 2 | 0 | 2 |

== Cross-country skiing ==
=== Qualification ===
As per the "A" standard, athletes with a maximum of 100 distance points were allowed to compete in both the sprint and distance events. Athletes with a maximum of 120 sprint points were allowed to compete in the sprint event. They were also allowed to compete in the distance event provided that their distance points did not exceed 300. NOCs which did not have any athlete meeting the "A" standard were allowed to enter one competitor of each sex (known as the basic quota) in the sprint event or the distance event provided that they satisfied the "B" standard of having a maximum of 300 distance points at the end of qualifying on 20 January 2018. A maximum of 20 athletes (maximum of 12 male or 12 female athletes) from a single participating NOC were allowed to compete and the remaining quotas were allocated further to athletes satisfying the "B" standard criteria from other NOCs.

Indian skier Jagadish Singh achieved the basic qualification mark to participate in the men's 15 km classical distance event at a qualifying event held at Finland in 2017. As per the final quota allocation released on 20 January 2014, India was allocated one place for the distance event under the basic quota. Singh hailed from the Indian state of Uttarakhand. He was part of the Indian Army and trained at the High Altitude Warfare School at Gulmarg. For participation in the main event, Singh did not have adequate funding from the Government of India and had to be sponsored by the Indian Army apart from spending from his own pocket to procure sporting gear and equipment.

=== Main event ===
The main event was held on 16 February 2018 at the Alpensia Cross-Country Skiing Centre and marked Singh's first and only participation at the Winter Olympic Games. Singh completed the 15 km (9.3 mi) course in 43:00.3. He finished the race in 99th position (out of 119 competitors), more than nine minutes behind the winner, Dario Cologna of Switzerland. (Note: Singh finished 103rd amongst those who had completed the course. He was classified in 99th after four athletes were disqualified later.)

| Athlete | Event | Intermediate 1 | | Intermediate 2 | | Intermediate 3 | | Final | | |
| Athlete | Event | Time | Rank | Time | Rank | Time | Rank | Time | Deficit | Rank |
|---|---|---|---|---|---|---|---|---|---|---|
| Jagdish Singh | Men's 15 km freestyle | 3:55.0 | 99 | 20:46.6 | 100 | 39.02.4 | 99 | 43:00.3 | +9:16.4 | 99 |

== Luge ==
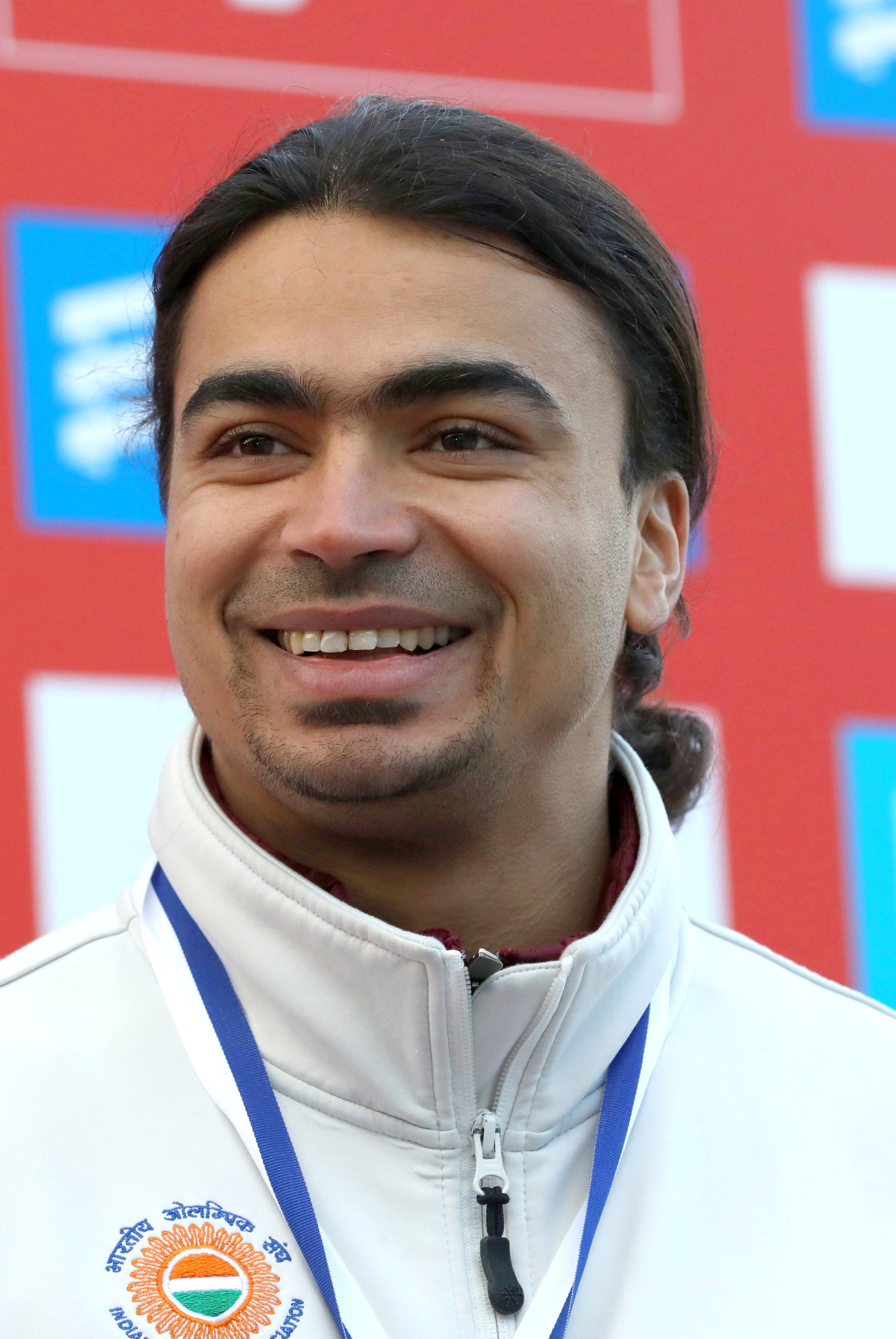
Shiva Keshavan qualified for the luge event for the sixth consecutive Winter Games

=== Qualification ===
As per the qualification criteria, a maximum of 40 men were eligible for qualification with a maximum of three per nation. The qualification was based on the cumulative world ranking points from 1 July 2016 to 31 December 2017. The top ranked 37 athletes qualified directly and eight athletes were later added with first preference given to qualified relay teams who did not qualify individuals in all three disciplines followed by athletes from NOCs that met the minimum standards and who had not already qualified any athlete.

Shiva Keshavan qualified in men's singles by being ranked 31st in the qualification standings. Keshavan hailed from Manali in Himachal Pradesh and had represented India since 1997. He was the youngest ever men's luge competitor at the 1998 Nagano Olympics, where he finished 28th. This was Kesavan's sixth consecutive appearance at the Winter Olympic Games as he was also the sole Indian athlete to compete at the 2002 Winter Olympics and further represented India in the 2006, 2010, and 2014 Games.

=== Main event ===
The event was held from 10 to 11 February 2018 at the Alpensia Sliding Centre. This was Keshavan's final Olympics appearance as an athlete. In his first run, he clocked a time of 50.578, finishing 2.926 seconds behind the leader David Gleirscher. He had his best run in the second attempt where he clocked 48.710 to be ranked 31st amongst the 40 participants. However, he completed the circuit in 48.900 in the penultimate run to be ranked 30th and was eliminated. He clocked a total time of 2:28.188 and was classified in the 34th position out of the 40 athletes in the final rankings.

| Athlete | Event | Run 1 | | Run 2 | | Run 3 | | Run 4 | | Total | |
| Athlete | Event | Time | Rank | Time | Rank | Time | Rank | Time | Rank | Time | Rank |
|---|---|---|---|---|---|---|---|---|---|---|---|
| Shiva Keshavan | Men's singles | 50.578 | 36 | 48.710 | 31 | 48.900 | 30 | Eliminated | | 2:28.188 | 34 |

== See also ==
- India at the 2017 Asian Winter Games
- India at the 2018 Summer Youth Olympics
