= India at the 1998 Winter Olympics =

- IOC code: IND
- NOC: Indian Olympic Association
- Website: olympic.ind.in

in Nagano
- Competitors: 1 (1 man) in 1 sport
- Flag bearer: Shiva Keshavan
- Medals: Gold 0 Silver 0 Bronze 0 Total 0

Winter Olympics appearances (overview)
- 1964; 1968; 1972–1984; 1988; 1992; 1994; 1998; 2002; 2006; 2010; 2014; 2018; 2022; 2026

Other related appearances
- Independent Olympic Participants (2014)

India competed at the 1998 Winter Olympics in Nagano, Japan, from 7 to 22 February 1998. This was the nation's fifth appearance at the Winter Olympics since its debut in 1964 and marked its return to the Games after missing the previous Olympics in 1994. (Note: The first medals for alpinism were awarded at closing ceremony of the 1924 Winter Olympics in Chamonix, to the members of the unsuccessful 1922 British Mount Everest expedition led by Charles Granville Bruce. The medals were awarded to 21 people: the thirteen British expedition members, seven Indian Sherpas who died during the ascent and one Nepalese soldier. As the medal was awarded to a team of players of various nationalities, the International Olympic Committee recognizes it as a medal awarded to the mixed team rather than any individual nation.)

The India team consisted of one male luger, Shiva Keshavan, who was the country's flag-bearer during the opening ceremony. He did not win a medal, and as of these Games, India had not earned a Winter Olympic medal.

== Background ==
The Indian Olympic Association was recognized by the International Olympic Committee in 1927. However, by this time, they had already competed in three Summer Olympic Games, in 1900, 1920, and 1924. The nation made its first Winter Olympics appearance at the 1964 Winter Olympics held in Innsbruck, Austria. This edition of the Games marked the nation's fifth appearance at the Winter Olympics.

The Indian delegation consisted of a lone athlete, Shiva Keshavan. Keshavan was the country's flag-bearer during the opening ceremony.

== Competitors ==
Sport	Men	Women	Total
Luge	1	0	1
Total	1	0	1

== Luge ==
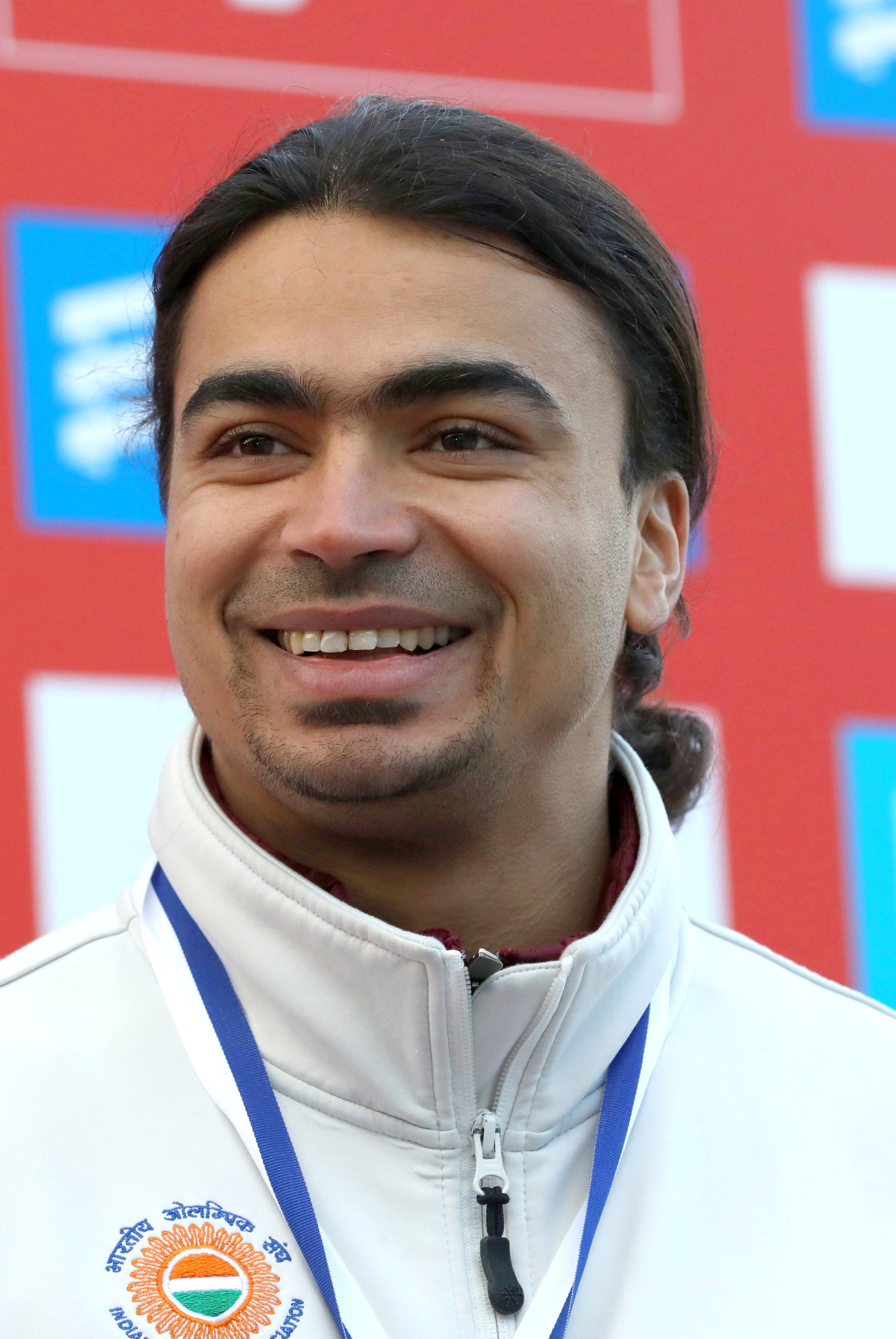
Shiva Keshavan was the only Indian participant in the Games.

Shiva Keshavan was the only Indian to qualify for the event. He had represented India since 1997 and was the youngest ever men's luge competitor at the 1998 Nagano Olympics. This was his second consecutive appearance at the Winter Olympic Games since he made his debut at the previous Olympics. He competed with a rented sled and money raised on his own as the Indian Olympic Association did not sponsor his participation.

The event was held from 8 to 9 February 1998 at the Spiral. In his first run, Keshavan clocked a time of 52.315, finishing 2.596 behind the leader Georg Hackl. In the second run, he clocked 52.127 to be ranked 29th amongst the 33 participants. In the third run, he completed the circuit with the time of 52.043 to be ranked 28th. He recorded his best time of 51.900 in the final run. Keshavan finished more than nine seconds behind the gold medalist Hackl and was classified in the 28th position with a total time of 3:28.385.

Athlete	Run 1		Run 2		Run 3		Run 4		Total	
Athlete	Time	Rank	Time	Rank	Time	Rank	Time	Rank	Time	Rank
Shiva Keshavan	52.315	29	52.127	29	52.043	28	51.900	27	3:28.385	28
