= India at the 1988 Winter Olympics =

- IOC code: IND
- NOC: Indian Olympic Association
- Website: olympic.ind.in

in Calgary
- Competitors: 3 (2 men and 1 woman) in 1 sport
- Flag bearer: Kishor Rahtna Rai
- Medals: Gold 0 Silver 0 Bronze 0 Total 0

Winter Olympics appearances (overview)
- 1964; 1968; 1972–1984; 1988; 1992; 1994; 1998; 2002; 2006; 2010; 2014; 2018; 2022; 2026

Other related appearances
- Independent Olympic Participants (2014)

India competed at the 1988 Winter Olympics in Calgary, Canada, from 13 to 28 February 1988. This was the nation's third appearance at the Winter Olympics since its debut in 1964 and marked its return to the Games after the 1968. (Note: The first medals for alpinism were awarded at closing ceremony of the 1924 Winter Olympics in Chamonix, to the members of the unsuccessful 1922 British Mount Everest expedition led by Charles Granville Bruce. The medals were awarded to 21 people: the thirteen British expedition members, seven Indian Sherpas who died during the ascent and one Nepalese soldier. As the medal was awarded to a team of players of various nationalities, the International Olympic Committee recognizes it as a medal awarded to the mixed team rather than any individual nation.)

The India team consisted of three alpine skiers, including the nation's first ever female athlete Shailaja Kumar. Kishor Rahtna Rai was the country's flag-bearer during the opening ceremony. India did not win a medal, and as of these Games, India had not earned a Winter Olympic medal.

== Background ==
The Indian Olympic Association was recognized by the International Olympic Committee in 1927. However, by this time, they had already competed in three Summer Olympic Games, in 1900, 1920, and 1924. The nation made its first Winter Olympics appearance at the 1964 Winter Olympics held in Innsbruck, Austria. This edition of the Games marked the nation's third appearance at the Winter Olympics and its return to the Games after the 1968 Games.

The Indian delegation consisted of three athletes. Kishor Rahtna Rai was the country's flag-bearer during the opening ceremony.

== Competitors ==
The Indian delegation consisted of three alpine skiers–Kishor Rahtna Rai, Gul Dev and Shailaja Kumar. Shailaja was the first Indian woman athlete to compete in the Winter Olympics.

Sport	Men	Women	Total
Alpine skiing	2	1	3
Total	2	1	3

== Alpine skiing ==
Gul Dev and Rahtna Rai competed in the men's slalom event and Shailaja competed in the women's slalom event in alpine skiing. The Games marked the debut and only participation of the three athletes in the Olympics.

The events were held from 26 to 27 February 1988 at Nakiska. In the men's slalom event, Rahtna Rai finished 49th amongst the 109 competitors while Dev failed to finish. In the women's event, Shailaja finished 28th with a time of 2:53.91 amongst the 57 competitors.

Slalom

Athlete	Event	Race 1	Race 2	Total	
Athlete	Event	Time	Time	Time	Rank
Gul Dev	Men	DSQ			
Kishor Rahtna Rai	Men	1:31.42	1:20.79	2:52.21	49
Shailaja Kumar	Women	1:26.98	1:25.29	2:52.27	28
