= India at the 2022 Winter Olympics =

- Flag of India
- IOC code: IND
- NOC: Indian Olympic Association
- Website: olympic.ind.in

in Beijing, China 4–20 February 2022
- Competitors: 1 (1 man) in 1 sport
- Flag bearer (opening): Arif Khan
- Flag bearer (closing): Volunteer
- Medals: Gold 0 Silver 0 Bronze 0 Total 0

Winter Olympics appearances (overview)
- 1964; 1968; 1972–1984; 1988; 1992; 1994; 1998; 2002; 2006; 2010; 2014; 2018; 2022; 2026

Other related appearances
- Independent Olympic Participants (2014)

India competed at the 2022 Winter Olympics in Beijing, China, from 4 to 20 February 2022. The country's participation in Beijing marked its eleventh appearance at the Winter Olympics since its debut in 1964. (Note: The first medals for alpinism were awarded at closing ceremony of the 1924 Winter Olympics in Chamonix, to the members of the unsuccessful 1922 British Mount Everest expedition led by Charles Granville Bruce. The medals were awarded to 21 people: the thirteen British expedition members, seven Indian Sherpas who died during the ascent and one Nepalese soldier. As the medal was awarded to a team of players of various nationalities, the International Olympic Committee recognizes it as a medal awarded to the mixed team rather than any individual nation.) (Note: An Indian athlete entered the 2014 Winter Olympics as an Independent Olympic Participant as the Indian Olympic Association was suspended during the time. The suspension was revoked when the games were underway and two other competitors competed under the Indian flag.)

The India team consisted of one male alpine skier, Arif Khan, who was the country's flag-bearer during the opening ceremony. He did not win a medal, and as of these Games, India had not earned a Winter Olympic medal. A volunteer served as the flag-bearer during the closing ceremony.

Following China's decision to make one of its soldiers involved in the border clashes with India as a torchbearer for the Olympics, the Indian Ministry of External Affairs announced that no official from India would attend the opening or closing ceremony of the games.

== Background ==
The Indian Olympic Association was recognized by the International Olympic Committee in 1927. However, by this time, they had already competed in three Summer Olympic Games, in 1900, 1920, and 1924. The nation made its first Winter Olympics appearance at the 1964 Winter Olympics held in Innsbruck, Austria. This edition of the Games marked the nation's eleventh appearance at the Winter Olympics.

While many countries from the west announced a diplomatic boycott of the games as a protest against the human rights abuses in China, India announced that it will not join the boycott and supported China during the tripartite summit involving the two countries and Russia. But following China's decision to make Qi Fabao, one of its soldiers involved in the July 2020 border skirmishes with India, as a torchbearer during the torch relay held on 7 February 2022 as a prelude to the Olympic games, the Indian Ministry of External Affairs announced a diplomatic boycott of the games and that no official from India will attend the opening or closing ceremony of the games. While India claimed that the games are being unnecessarily politicised, China dismissed its concerns.

The Indian delegation consisted of chef de mission Harjinder Singh and a lone athlete, Arif Khan. Arif Khan was the country's flag-bearer during the opening ceremony, while a volunteer served as the flag-bearer during the closing ceremony. India did not win a medal, and as of these Games, had not earned a Winter Olympic medal.

== Competitors ==
One Indian athlete competed in the Games.

Sport	Men	Women	Total
Alpine skiing	1	0	1
Total	1	0	1

== Alpine skiing ==
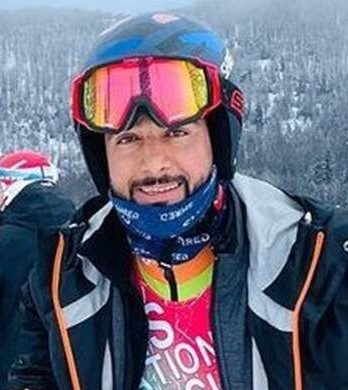
Arif Khan, the lone Indian participant in the games

The basic qualification mark for the slalom and giant slalom events stipulated an average of less than 160 points in the list published by the International Ski Federation (FIS) as on 17 January 2022. The quotas were allocated further based on athletes satisfying other criteria with a maximum of 22 athletes (11 male and 11 female athletes) from a single participating NOC. Indian alpine skier Arif Khan met the basic qualification standard with 127.20 points in the slalom and 137.26 points in the giant slalom categories. Subject to the other criteria, Khan qualified to participate in both the events at the games.

Khan hailed from the Jammu and Kashmir region of India. He won a gold medal in the slalom event in his first appearance at the India national championships. He made his international debut at the age of 16 at a junior event in Japan. He won two gold medals in the 2021 South Asian Winter Games in the slalom and giant slalom events. He had taken part in three FIS Alpine World Ski Championships with his best result being 45th in the giant slalom event at the 2021 edition in Italy. The games marked Khan's first and only appearance at the Winter Olympic Games.

In the giant slalom event held on 13 February 2022 at the Yanqing National Alpine Skiing Centre, Khan completed his first run in 1:22.35 to rank second to last among the 54 competitors. Though he took slightly longer to complete the course during his second run at 1:24.49, he ranked 44th. With a combined time of 2:47.24, he finished 45th in the overall classification. Khan registered the best ever finish by an Indian at the giant slalom event with the previous best being the 65th place achieved by Jeremy Bujakowski in the 1968 Winter Olympics.

In the slalom event held on 16 February 2022, Khan failed to finish his first run, thus earning a DNF. He started strongly, crossing the first intermediate check-point in 14.40s and the second in 34.41s before he veered off course and failed to go through one of the gates in the final sector, thus crashing out of the competition.

Athlete	Event	Run 1		Run 2		Total	
Athlete	Event	Time	Rank	Time	Rank	Time	Rank
Arif Khan	Men's giant slalom	1:22.35	53	1:24.49	44	2:47.24	45
Arif Khan	Men's slalom	DNF		Did not advance			

== See also ==
- India at the 2022 Commonwealth Games
- India at the 2022 Asian Games
