= India at the 1968 Winter Olympics =

- IOC code: IND
- NOC: Indian Olympic Association
- Website: olympic.ind.in

in Grenoble
- Competitors: 1 (1 man) in 1 sport
- Flag bearer: Jeremy Bujakowski
- Medals: Gold 0 Silver 0 Bronze 0 Total 0

Winter Olympics appearances (overview)
- 1964; 1968; 1972–1984; 1988; 1992; 1994; 1998; 2002; 2006; 2010; 2014; 2018; 2022; 2026

Other related appearances
- Independent Olympic Participants (2014)

India competed at the 1968 Winter Olympics in Grenoble, France, from 6 to 18 February 1968. This was the nation's second appearance at the Winter Olympics since its debut in 1964. (Note: The first medals for alpinism were awarded at closing ceremony of the 1924 Winter Olympics in Chamonix, to the members of the unsuccessful 1922 British Mount Everest expedition led by Charles Granville Bruce. The medals were awarded to 21 people: the thirteen British expedition members, seven Indian Sherpas who died during the ascent and one Nepalese soldier. As the medal was awarded to a team of players of various nationalities, the International Olympic Committee recognizes it as a medal awarded to the mixed team rather than any individual nation.)

The India team consisted of a lone alpine skier Jeremy Bujakowski, who served as the country's flag-bearer during the opening ceremony. He did not win a medal, and as of these Games, India had not earned a Winter Olympic medal.

== Background ==
The Indian Olympic Association was recognized by the International Olympic Committee in 1927. However, by this time, they had already competed in three Summer Olympic Games, in 1900, 1920, and 1924. The nation made its first Winter Olympics appearance at the 1964 Winter Olympics held in Innsbruck, Austria. This edition of the Games marked the nation's second consecutive appearance at the Winter Olympics.

The Indian delegation consisted of a single athlete Jeremy Bujakowski, who also served as the country's flag-bearer during the opening ceremony.

== Competitors ==
Sport	Men	Women	Total
Alpine skiing	1	0	1
Total	1	0	1

== Alpine skiing ==
Jeremy Bujakowski competed in the men's downhill, slalom, and giant slalom events in alpine skiing. He was India's first competitor in the Winter Olympic Games in previous edition. The Games marked his second and last appearance in the Olympics.

The events were held from 9 to 17 February 1968 at Chamrousse. In the men's downhill event, Bujakowski finished 53rd amongst the 86 competitors. In the giant slalom event, he finished 65th with a time of 4:01.93 amongst the 101 competitors.

Athlete	Event	Race 1		Race 2		Total	
Athlete	Event	Time	Rank	Time	Rank	Time	Rank
Jeremy Bujakowski	Downhill	—				2:11.82	53
Jeremy Bujakowski	Giant slalom	2:01.45	69	2:00.48	63	4:01.93	65

In the slalom event, Bujakowski did not finish the first heat while finishing second behind Guy Périllat amongst the four participants in the second heat. He did not advance to the final round.

Athlete	Heat 1		Heat 2		Final					
Athlete	Time	Rank	Time	Rank	Time 1	Rank	Time 2	Rank	Total	Rank
Jeremy Bujakowski	Slalom	DNF		57.78	2	Did not advance				
