= India at the 1964 Winter Olympics =

- IOC code: IND
- NOC: Indian Olympic Association
- Website: olympic.ind.in

in Innsbruck
- Competitors: 1 in 1 sport
- Flag bearer: Jeremy Bujakowski
- Medals: Gold 0 Silver 0 Bronze 0 Total 0

Winter Olympics appearances (overview)
- 1964; 1968; 1972–1984; 1988; 1992; 1994; 1998; 2002; 2006; 2010; 2014; 2018; 2022; 2026

Other related appearances
- Independent Olympic Participants (2014)

India sent a delegation to compete at the 1964 Winter Olympics in Innsbruck, Austria from 29 January to 9 February 1964. This was India's debut at the Winter Olympic Games. The sole athlete representing India was Jeremy Bujakowski, who competed in the men's downhill event in alpine skiing. He failed to finish the race, and went unranked in the competition.

== Background ==
The Indian Olympic Association was recognised by the International Olympic Committee on 31 December 1926. However, by this time, they had already competed in three Summer Olympic Games, in 1900, 1920, and 1924. India has participated in every Summer Olympics since 1920. The 1964 Innsbruck Olympics marked India's debut at the Winter Olympic Games. These Olympics were held from 29 January to 9 February 1964; a total of 1,091 athletes representing 36 National Olympic Committees took part. Jeremy Bujakowski was the only athlete representing India in Innsbruck.

== Alpine skiing ==
Jeremy Bujakowski was 24 years old at the time of the Innsbruck Olympics, and was making his Olympic debut. The Polish-born Bujakowski acquired Indian citizenship when his family moved there in the late 1940s, and later trained in the United States where he was educated at the University of Denver. On 30 January, he participated in the men's downhill, but failed to finish his run; the gold medal was won by Egon Zimmermann of Austria, the silver by Léo Lacroix of France, and the bronze was taken by Wolfgang Bartels of the German Unified Team. Bujakowski would go on to represent India at the 1968 Winter Olympics.

Athlete	Event	Race	
Athlete	Event	Time	Rank
Jeremy Bujakowski	Downhill	DNF	–

== See also ==
- India at the 1964 Summer Olympics
