= 2010 Winter Olympics closing ceremony flag bearers =

During the closing ceremony in Vancouver, the 82 nations selected one member of their delegation to be the flagbearer. Some countries for example, Albania chose the same athlete (Erjon Tola) as the opening ceremony. On the other hand, some countries such as Algeria had already left the Olympic village, and therefore had its NOC assistant carry the flag.

== Countries and flagbearers ==
Below is a list of all parading countries with their announced flag bearer, sorted in the order in which they appeared in the parade. This is sortable by country name under which they entered, the flag bearer's name, or the flag bearer's sport. Names are given as were officially designated by the International Olympic Committee (IOC).

No.	Country	Flag bearer	Sport
1	Greece	Vassilis Dimitriadis	Alpine skiing
2	Albania	Erjon Tola	Alpine skiing
3	Algeria	–	NOC assistant
4	Andorra	Mireia Gutiérrez	Alpine skiing
5	Argentina	Rubén González	Luge
6	Armenia	Sergey Mikayelyan	Cross-country skiing
7	Australia	Lydia Lassila	Freestyle skiing
8	Austria	Nina Reithmayer	Luge
9	Azerbaijan	Konul Nurullayera	Chef de mission
10	Belarus	Leanid Karneyenka	Cross-country skiing
11	Belgium	Pieter Gysel	Short track speed skating
12	Bermuda	Tucker Murphy	Cross-country skiing
13	Bosnia and Herzegovina	Marko Rudić	Alpine skiing
14	Brazil	Jaqueline Mourão	Cross-country skiing
15	Bulgaria	Evgenia Radanova	Short track speed skating
16	Cayman Islands	Dow Travers	Alpine skiing
17	Chile	Noelle Barahona	Alpine skiing
18	China	Zhao Hongbo	Figure skating
19	Colombia	Cynthia Denzler	Alpine skiing
20	Croatia	Ivan Šola	Bobsleigh
21	Cyprus	Sophia Papamichalopoulou	Alpine skiing
22	Czech Republic	Martina Sáblíková	Speed skating
23	North Korea (Dem. People's Rep. of Korea)	Ri Song Chol	Figure skating
24	Denmark	Johnny Frederiksen	Curling
25	Estonia	Kristina Šmigun-Vähi	Cross-country skiing
26	Ethiopia	Robel Teklemariam	Cross-country skiing
27	Finland	Tanja Poutiainen	Alpine skiing
28	Macedonia (Former Yugoslav Rep. of Macedonia)	Antonio Ristevski	Alpine skiing
29	France	Sandrine Bailly	Biathlon
30	Georgia	Elene Gedevanishvili	Figure skating
31	Germany	Magdalena Neuner	Biathlon
32	Ghana	Kwame Nkrumah-Acheampong	Alpine skiing
33	Great Britain	Amy Williams	Skeleton
34	Hong Kong	Han Yueshuang	Short track speed skating
35	Hungary	Erika Huszár	Short track speed skating
36	Iceland	Stefan Jon Sigurgeirsson	Alpine skiing
37	India	Tashi Lundup	Cross-country skiing
38	Iran (Islamic Rep. of Iran)	Hossein Saveh-Shemshaki	Alpine skiing
39	Ireland	Shane O'Connor	Alpine skiing
40	Israel	Mykhaylo Renzhyn	Alpine skiing
41	Italy	Giuliano Razzoli	Alpine skiing
42	Jamaica	Errol Kerr	Freestyle skiing
43	Japan	Mao Asada	Figure skating
44	Kazakhstan	Alexey Poltoranin	Cross-country skiing
45	South Korea (Rep. of Korea)	Mo Tae-bum	Speed skating
46	Kyrgyzstan	Dmitry Trelevski	Alpine skiing
47	Latvia	Haralds Silovs	Short track speed skating Speed skating
48	Lebanon	Ghassan Achi	Alpine skiing
49	Liechtenstein	Thomas Duerr	Bobsleigh
50	Lithuania	Mantas Strolia	Cross-country skiing
51	Mexico	Hubertus von Hohenlohe	Alpine skiing
52	Moldova	Victor Pinzaru	Biathlon
53	Monaco	Patrice Servelle	Bobsleigh
54	Mongolia	Khürelbaataryn Khash-Erdene	Cross-country skiing
55	Montenegro	Bojan Kosić	Alpine skiing
56	Morocco	Abdenbi Lerhenane	Chef de mission
57	Nepal	Dachhiri Sherpa	Cross-country skiing
58	Netherlands	Sven Kramer	Speed skating
59	New Zealand	Ben Sandford	Skeleton
60	Norway	Petter Northug	Cross-country skiing
61	Pakistan	Muhammad Abbas	Alpine skiing
62	Peru	Roberto Carcelen	Cross-country skiing
63	Poland	Katarzyna Bachleda-Curuś	Speed skating
64	Portugal	Danny Silva	Cross-country skiing
65	Romania	Éva Tófalvi	Biathlon
66	Russia (Russian Federation)	Ivan Skobrev	Speed skating
67	San Marino	Gian Luca Borgagni	Chef de mission
68	Senegal	Leyti Seck	Alpine skiing
69	Serbia	Vuk Rađenović	Bobsleigh
70	Slovakia	Pavol Hurajt	Biathlon
71	Slovenia	Mitja Valenčič	Alpine skiing
72	South Africa	Alex Heath	Coach – Alpine skiing
73	Spain	Laura Orgué	Cross-country skiing
74	Sweden	Marcus Hellner	Cross-country skiing
75	Switzerland	Dario Cologna	Cross-country skiing
76	Chinese Taipei	Ma Chih-hung	Luge
77	Tajikistan	Alisher Qudraton	Official
78	Turkey	Tuğba Karademir	Figure skating
79	Ukraine	Valentina Shevchenko	Cross-country skiing
80	United States	Bill Demong	Nordic combined
81	Uzbekistan	Oleg Shamaev	Alpine skiing
82	Canada	Joannie Rochette	Figure skating
