= Kesavan =

Kesavan is both a surname and a given name. Notable people with the name include:

- B. S. Kesavan, Indian librarian
- C. Kesavan (1891–1969), Indian politician, lawyer and activist
- C. G. Kesavan (1895–1980), Indian journalist
- H. K. Kesavan, Indian academic
- Mukul Kesavan, Indian writer
- Sudhakar Kesavan, Indian engineer
- Kesavan Soon (born 1939), Singaporean sprinter

== See also ==
- Keshavan
