= India at the 2026 Winter Olympics =

- Flag of India
- IOC code: IND
- NOC: Indian Olympic Association
- Website: olympic.ind.in

in Milan and Cortina d'Ampezzo, Italy 6 February 2026 – 22 February 2026
- Competitors: 2 (2 men) in 2 sports
- Flag bearer (opening): Arif Khan
- Flag bearer (closing): Stanzin Lundup
- Medals: Gold 0 Silver 0 Bronze 0 Total 0

Winter Olympics appearances (overview)
- 1964; 1968; 1972–1984; 1988; 1992; 1994; 1998; 2002; 2006; 2010; 2014; 2018; 2022; 2026

Other related appearances
- Independent Olympic Participants (2014)

India competed at the 2026 Winter Olympics in Milan and Cortina d'Ampezzo, Italy, from 6 to 22 February 2026.

Alpine skier Arif Khan was the country's flagbearer during the opening ceremony. Meanwhile, Stanzin Lundup was the country's flagbearer during the closing ceremony.

== Competitors ==
The following is the list of the number of competitors participating at the Games per sport/discipline.

Sport	Men	Women	Total
Alpine skiing	1	0	1
Cross-country skiing	1	0	1
Total	2	0	2

== Alpine skiing ==
India qualified one male alpine skier through the basic quota.

Athlete	Event	Run 1		Run 2		Total	
Athlete	Event	Time	Rank	Time	Rank	Time	Rank
Arif Khan	Men's slalom	1:22.12	44	1:19.48	39	2:41.60	39

== Cross-country skiing ==
India qualified one male cross-country skier through the basic quota.

Distance

Athlete	Event	Final		
Athlete	Event	Time	Deficit	Rank
Stanzin Lundup	Men's 10 km freestyle	28:26.7	+7:50.5	104
