= Keshavan =

Keshavan is both a surname and a given name. Notable people with the name include:

- Shiva Keshavan (born 1981), Indian luger
- Keshavan Maslak (born 1947), American jazz musician

== See also ==
- Guruvayur Keshavan (1904–1976), a temple-elephant of Kerala, South India
- Kesavan
