= Jagdish Singh (skier) =

Indian cross-country skier

Personal information
- Born: 1 July 1991 (age 34) Uttarakhand, India
- Occupation(s): Indian Army, Athlete

Sport
- Country: India
- Sport: Cross-country skiing
- Event: Men's 15 km freestyle
- Club: Army High Altitude Warfare School, India
- Coached by: Nadeem Iqbal

Jagdish Singh (born 1 July 1991) is an Indian cross-country skier, who represented India at 2018 Winter Olympics in PyeongChang. He competed in men's 15 km freestyle cross-country skiing. He qualified in the Olympics for the first time.

== Career ==
Singh joined the Indian Army in 2011. He received his training from Indian Army's High Altitude Warfare School (HAWS) in Gulmarg, Jammu & Kashmir. He qualified in the 2018 Winter Olympics by securing just one point above the qualification mark, during an event in Finland. There was a bit controversy during appointment of his coach, however, just before the event, HAWS recommended Nadeem Iqbal, a former winter Olympian, as his coach.

== 2018 Pyeongchang Winter Olympics results ==
Year	Age	Venue	Event	Position	Time	Deficit
2018	26	PyeongChang, South Korea	15 km freestyle	103rd	43:00.3	+9:16.4

== See also ==
- India at the 2018 Winter Olympics
