= Cross-country skiing at the 2011 South Asian Winter Games =

Cross-country skiing at the 2011 South Asian Winter Games will be held at Auli, India.

== Men's events ==
Event	Gold	Silver	Bronze
10 kilometre freestyle	Bhubneshwari Devi; India	Phuntchuk; India	Yasmeen Attrwon; India
15 kilometre freestyle	Nadeem Iqbal; India	Karsilampoon; India	Hemant Kumar; India

== Women's events ==
Event	Gold	Silver	Bronze
3 kilometre freestyle			
5 kilometre freestyle			
10 kilometre freestyle	Bhavaneshwari; India	Yasmin Akhtar; India	Mehjabeen; India
