= Malayala Rajyam =

Malayalam-language newspaper

Cover of the 1951 June edition of Malayala Rajyam weekly

Malayala Rajyam was a Malayalam-language newspaper founded by K. G. Shankar in 1929 in Quilon, Travancore. Its main aim was to support the Indian independence movement and the activities of Indian National Congress. It became a daily in 1931 and was amongst the earliest daily morning newspapers in Kerala. The newspaper featured despatches from the Associated Press of India and Reuters as well as news pictures fed by international photo agencies. It had modern printing equipment and even operated a bus service to distribute the copies to agents on time. The news agency Keralapress was established in 1930 in Madras and served as a mail service giving news about Malayali activities in Madras to Malayala Rajyam.

Malayala Rayam was one of the largest circulated newspapers in southern Kerala during the 1930s and was particularly popular among the Nair community of Kerala. A weekly was also published, also named Malayala Rajyam. The newspaper fell on bad days after Shankar relinquished control due to a prolonged illness. It became a pro-government newspaper after K. G. Parameswaran Pillai became the editor. It became defunct in the late 1960s. Several prominent figures such as C. V. Kunhiraman, C. S. Subramanian Potty, Bappu Rao, Kainikkara Padmanabha Pillai and V. Gangadharan were associated with Malayala Rajyam.
