= India at the 1992 Winter Olympics =

- IOC code: IND
- NOC: Indian Olympic Association
- Website: olympic.ind.in

in Albertville
- Competitors: 2 in 1 sport
- Medals: Gold 0 Silver 0 Bronze 0 Total 0

Winter Olympics appearances (overview)
- 1964; 1968; 1972–1984; 1988; 1992; 1994; 1998; 2002; 2006; 2010; 2014; 2018; 2022; 2026

Other related appearances
- Independent Olympic Participants (2014)

India competed at the 1992 Winter Olympics in Albertville, France, from 8 to 23 February 1992. This was the nation's fourth appearance at the Winter Olympics since its debut in 1964 and marked its second consecutive appearance after its return to the Games in 1988. (Note: The first medals for alpinism were awarded at closing ceremony of the 1924 Winter Olympics in Chamonix, to the members of the unsuccessful 1922 British Mount Everest expedition led by Charles Granville Bruce. The medals were awarded to 21 people: the thirteen British expedition members, seven Indian Sherpas who died during the ascent and one Nepalese soldier. As the medal was awarded to a team of players of various nationalities, the International Olympic Committee recognizes it as a medal awarded to the mixed team rather than any individual nation.)

The India team consisted of two male alpine skiers, Lal Chuni and Nanak Chand. India did not win a medal, and as of these Games, India had not earned a Winter Olympic medal.

== Background ==
The Indian Olympic Association was recognized by the International Olympic Committee in 1927. However, by this time, they had already competed in three Summer Olympic Games, in 1900, 1920, and 1924. The nation made its first Winter Olympics appearance at the 1964 Winter Olympics held in Innsbruck, Austria. This edition of the Games marked the nation's fourth appearance at the Winter Olympics.

== Competitors ==
The Indian delegation consisted of two male alpine skiers, Lal Chuni and Nanak Chand.

| Sport | Men | Women | Total |
|---|---|---|---|
| Alpine skiing | 2 | 0 | 2 |
| Total | 2 | 0 | 2 |

== Alpine skiing ==
Nanak Chand and Lal Chuni both competed in the men's slalom and giant slalom events in alpine skiing. The Games marked the debut and only participation of both the men in the Olympics.

The events were held from 18 to 22 February 1998 at Val d'Isère and Les Menuires. In the giant slalom event, Chand finished 82nd amongst the 131 competitors while Chuni failed to finish. In the slalom event, Chand finished 58th with a time of 2:53.91 and Chuni finished 61st with a time of 3:03.05 amongst the 119 competitors.

| Athlete | Event | Race 1 | Race 2 | Total | |
| Athlete | Event | Time | Time | Time | Rank |
|---|---|---|---|---|---|
| Lal Chuni | Giant slalom | 1:39.56 | DNF | | |
| Nanak Chand | Giant slalom | 1:31.98 | 1:37.05 | 3:09.03 | 82 |
| Lal Chuni | Slalom | 1:33.80 | 1:29.25 | 3:03.05 | 61 |
| Nanak Chand | Slalom | 1:30.02 | 1:23.89 | 2:53.91 | 58 |
