= Gupta Bahadur =

Indian cross-country skier (born 1976)

Personal information
- Full name: Gupta Bahadur Gurung
- Born: 7 September 1976 (age 49) Nepal
- Occupation(s): Indian Army, athlete

Sport
- Country: India
- Sport: Cross-country skiing

Gupta Bahadur Gurung (born 7 September 1976) is an Indian skier. He qualified for 2006 Winter Olympics, where he represented India. He participated in Men's sprint event of Cross-country skiing. He finished 78 in his event.

He was third in the International Cross-country skiing race at Gulmarg in January 2005. He also participated and did well in Cross-country races held in Bolu Gerede and Uludag Balkan.

He joined the Indian Army in 1999, and subsequently started training for up 15 km cross-country skiing. He won National Championships and was named the best athlete at the National Winter Games in Auli, 2002.

== See also ==
- Cross-country skiing at the 2006 Winter Olympics – Men's sprint
- Cross-country skiing at the 2006 Winter Olympics
- 2006 Winter Olympics
