= India at the 2014 Winter Olympics =

- IOC code: IND
- NOC: Indian Olympic Association
- Website: olympic.ind.in

in Sochi, Russia 7–23 February 2014
- Competitors: 2 (2 men) in 2 sports
- Flag bearer (opening): Did not participate
- Flag bearer (closing): Himanshu Thakur
- Medals: Gold 0 Silver 0 Bronze 0 Total 0

Winter Olympics appearances (overview)
- 1964; 1968; 1972–1984; 1988; 1992; 1994; 1998; 2002; 2006; 2010; 2014; 2018; 2022; 2026

Other related appearances
- Independent Olympic Participants (2014)

Three athletes from India qualified for the 2014 Winter Olympics in Sochi, Russia, held between 7 and 23 February 2014. The country's participation in Sochi marked its ninth appearance at the Winter Olympics since its debut in 1964. (Note: The first medals for alpinism were awarded at closing ceremony of the 1924 Winter Olympics in Chamonix, to the members of the unsuccessful 1922 British Mount Everest expedition led by Charles Granville Bruce. The medals were awarded to 21 people: the thirteen British expedition members, seven Indian Sherpas who died during the ascent and one Nepalese soldier. As the medal was awarded to a team of players of various nationalities, the International Olympic Committee recognizes it as a medal awarded to the mixed team rather than any individual nation.)

While three Indians qualified for the games, they entered the competition as Independent Olympic Participants due to the suspension of the Indian Olympic Association since 2012. After Shiva Keshavan had participated in the luge event on 11 February 2014, the International Olympic Committee reinstated India's National Olympic Committee (NOC). This allowed the other two athletes, Himanshu Thakur and Nadeem Iqbal, who still had their respective events to compete under the Indian flag.

As participation under the Indian flag was not approved initially, there was no official flag-bearer during the opening ceremony. Thakur served as the flag-bearer during the closing ceremony. India did not win a medal, and as of these Games, India had not earned a Winter Olympic medal.

== Background ==
The Indian Olympic Association was recognized by the International Olympic Committee in 1927. However, by this time, they had already competed in three Summer Olympic Games, in 1900, 1920, and 1924. The nation made its first Winter Olympics appearance until the 1964 Winter Olympics held in Innsbruck, Austria. This edition of the Games marked the nation's ninth appearance at the Winter Olympics.

The Indian Olympic Association (IOA) was suspended by the International Olympic Committee (IOC) due to government interference in the autonomy of the country's National Olympic Committee (NOC) in December 2012. It was announced on 31 December 2013 that India would be competing under the Olympic flag in Sochi. Shiva Keshavan had traveled to Sochi independently and the skiing team consisting of athletes Himanshu Thakur, and Nadeem Iqbal and three coaches traveled from Delhi to Sochi on 5 February 2014. As participation under the Indian flag was not approved, there was no official flag-bearer during the opening ceremony.

Elections for the Indian Olympic Association were scheduled two days after the opening ceremony, which was the major condition for the suspension to be lifted. The International Olympic Committee eventually reinstated the Indian Olympic Association on 11 February after the election of a new board headed by Narayana Ramachandran, the president of the World Squash Federation, who was voted in as its new president. By then, Keshavan had already participated in the luge event on 11 February 2014 as an Independent Olympic Participant.

The other two athletes Himanshu Thakur and Nadeem Iqbal, who still had pending events were able to compete under the Indian flag. On 16 February 2014, the Indian flag was hoisted in the Games village by the newly IOA president in the presence of IOC officials and the Indian delegation. Thakur served as the flag-bearer during the closing ceremony.

== Competitors ==
Sport	Men	Women	Total
Alpine skiing	1	0	1
Cross-country skiing	1	0	1
Luge	1 (Note: Shiva Keshavan competed as an Independent athlete due to the suspension of Indian Olympic Association during his event)	0	1
Total	2	0	2

== Alpine skiing ==
=== Qualification ===
The basic qualification mark for slalom and giant slalom events stipulated an average of less than 140 points in the list published by the International Ski Federation (FIS) as of 19 January 2014 for competitors ranked outside the top 100. The quotas were allocated further based on athletes satisfying other criteria, with a maximum of 22 athletes (maximum of 14 male or 14 female athletes) from a single participating NOC with not more than four participants in a single event. As per the final quota allocation released on 20 January 2014, In December 2013, Indian alpine skiers Himanshu Thakur and Hira Lal achieved the basic qualification mark for the giant slalom event.

Despite two athletes achieving the qualification standard, India was allocated only one quota place based on the allocation criteria. Though Lal had prior experience having participated in the 2006 Turin Olympics, Thakur was selected for the event on account of his better performances in the recent events. The 20-year old Thakur hailed from Manali in the Indian state Himachal Pradesh and is a younger cousin of Lal.

=== Main event ===
Thakur was initially slated to compete as an Independent athlete at the games. But after the reinstatement of the Indian Olympic Committee on 11 February 2014, he received the necessary funding and equipment from the Government of India two days later, less than a week before the main event. The giant slalom event was held on 19 February 2014 at the Rosa Khutor Alpine Resort and marked Thakur's first and only appearance at the Winter Olympic Games. Thakur completed his first run in 1:47.86 to rank 71st. He took slightly longer to complete the course in the second run at 1:49.69 to be ranked 72nd among the competition. With a combined time of 3:37.55, he finished 72nd and last amongst the classified finishers in the overall classification.

Athlete	Event	Run 1		Run 2		Total	
Athlete	Event	Time	Rank	Time	Rank	Time	Rank
Himanshu Thakur	Men's giant slalom	1:47.86	71	1:49.69	72	3:37.55	72

== Cross-country skiing ==
=== Qualification ===
As per the "A" standard, athletes with a maximum of 100 distance points were allowed to compete in both the sprint and distance events. Athletes with a maximum of 120 sprint points were allowed to compete in the sprint event. They were also allowed to compete in the distance event provided that their distance points did not exceed 300. NOCs which did not have any athlete meeting the "A" standard were allowed to enter one competitor of each sex (known as the basic quota) in the sprint event or the distance event provided that they satisfied the "B" standard of having a maximum of 300 distance points at the end of qualifying on 20 January 2014. A maximum of 20 athletes (maximum of 12 male or 12 female athletes) from a single participating NOC were allowed to compete and the remaining quotas were allocated further to athletes satisfying the "B" standard criteria from other NOCs.

Indian skier Nadeem Iqbal achieved the basic qualification mark to participate in the Men's 15 km classical distance event at the Nordic qualifying ski event held at France and Italy in November–December. As per the final quota allocation released on 20 January 2014, India was allocated one place for the distance event under the basic quota. Iqbal hailed from Gulmarg in the Indian state of Jammu and Kashmir. He is the first athlete representing the Indian Army from the state to qualify for the Winter Olympic Games.

=== Main event ===
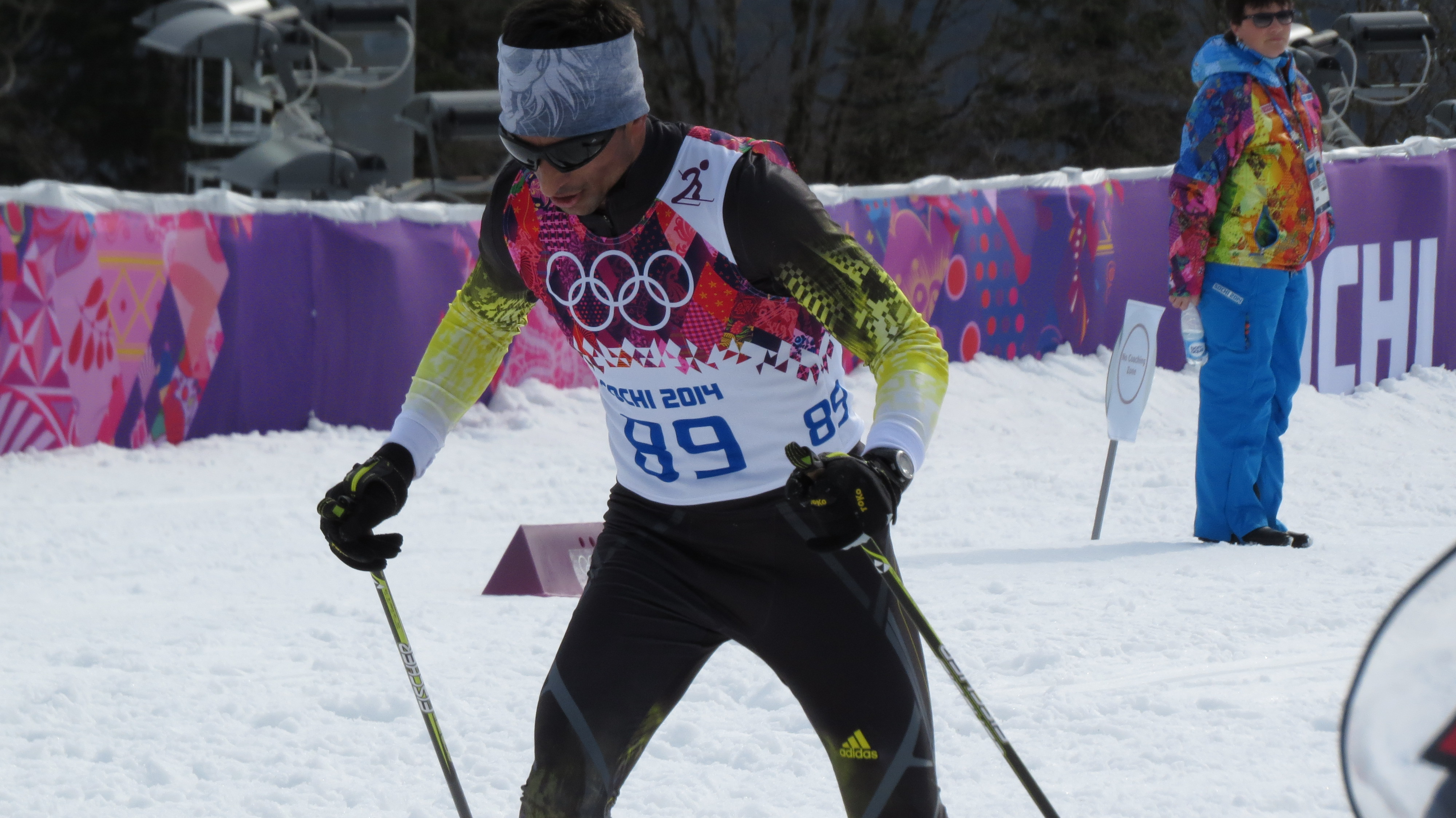
Nadeem Iqbal during the cross-country event

Iqbal was initially slated to compete as an Independent athlete at the games. But after the reinstatement of the Indian Olympic Committee on 11 February 2014, he received clearance to compete under the Indian flag the day before the main event. The main event was held on 14 February 2014 at the Laura Biathlon & Ski Complex and marked Iqbal's first and only participation in the Winter Olympic Games. Iqbal completed the 15 km (9.3 mi) course in 55:12.5. He finished the race in 85th position (out of 87 competitors who completed the race), nearly 17 minutes behind the winner Dario Cologna of Switzerland.

Athlete	Event	Final		
Athlete	Event	Time	Deficit	Rank
Nadeem Iqbal	Men's 15 km classical	55:12.5	+16:42.8	85

== Luge ==
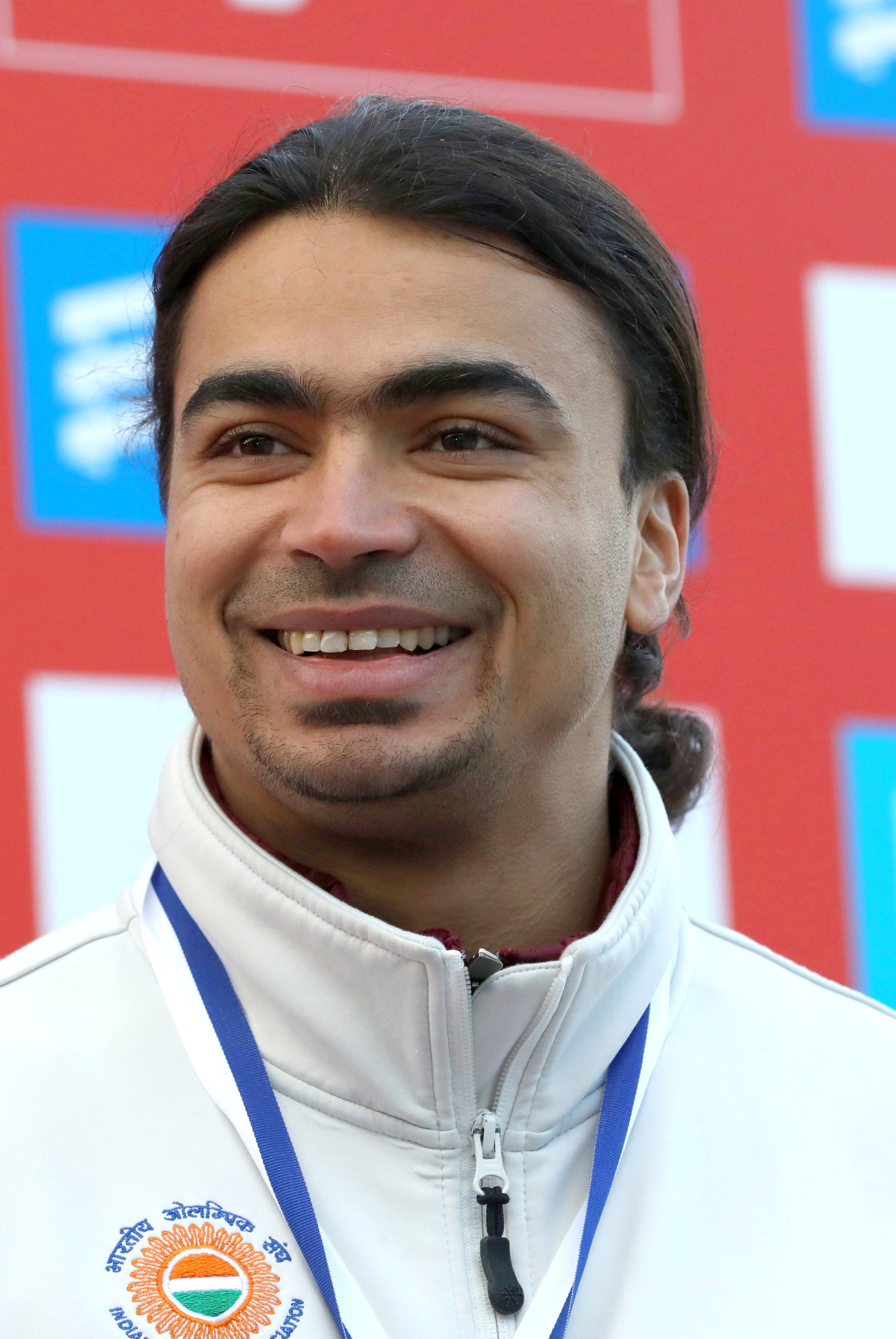
Shiva Keshavan qualified for the luge event, but competed as an independent participant due to the suspension of the Indian NOC.

=== Qualification ===
As per the qualification criteria, a maximum of 38 men were eligible for qualification. The qualification was based on the cumulative world ranking points from 1 November to 31 December 2013. The top ranked 30 athletes qualified directly and eight athletes were later added with first preference given to qualified relay teams who did not qualify individuals in all three disciplines followed by athletes from NOCs that met the minimum standards and who had not already qualified any athlete. India got one of the additional quota spots, as no nations were able to use them to complete a relay. Shiva Keshavan was the only Indian to qualify for the event. Keshavan had represented India since 1997 and was the youngest ever men's luge competitor at the 1998 Nagano Olympics, where he finished 28th. He was also the sole Indian athlete to compete at the 2002 Winter Olympics and further represented India in the 2006 and 2010 Games.

=== Main event ===
In the main event, Keshavan competed as an Independent Olympic Participant due to the suspension of the Indian NOC. This was Kesavan's fifth consecutive appearance at the Winter Olympic Games since he made his debut at the 1998 Nagano Olympics.

The event was held on 11 February 2014 at the Sliding Center Sanki. In his first run, Keshavan clocked a time of 53.905, finishing 1.735 behind the leader Albert Demchenko. In the second run, he clocked 55.203 to be ranked next to last amongst the 39 participants. In the penultimate run, he completed the circuit with a slightly better time of 54.706 to be ranked 37th. He had his best run in the final attempt, finishing 34th with a time of 53.335. Keshavan clocked a total time of 3:37.149 and was classified in the 37th position out of the 39 athletes, marking his worst ever performance at the Winter Olympic Games.

Athlete	Event	Run 1		Run 2		Run 3		Run 4		Total	
Athlete	Event	Time	Rank	Time	Rank	Time	Rank	Time	Rank	Time	Rank
Shiva Keshavan	Men's singles	53.905	35	55.203	38	54.706	37	53.335	34	3:37.149	37
