= Stanzin Lundup =

Indian cross-country skier (born 1998)

Personal information
- Born: 11 June 1998 (age 27) Hemis, Jammu and Kashmir, India (now in Ladakh)
- Occupation: Indian Army athlete

Sport
- Country: India
- Sport: Cross-country skiing

Stanzin Lundup (born 11 June 1998) is an Indian cross-country skier who competed at the 2026 Winter Olympics in the 10 kilometre freestyle for India. He placed 104th in the event.

== Personal life ==
Lundup serves in the Indian Army.
