= Keralapress =

News agency

Keralapress is a Malayalam language News agency established in the year 1930 by veteran journalist C.G.Kesavan from Madras, from where he was working with The Hindu at the time.

== Origins ==
Keralapress (Kerala Press Service)(Kepra) commenced operation as a mail service giving news about Malayali activities in Madras to the Malayalam daily Malayala Rajyam published from Kollam. In 1942 the operation was shifted to Quilon where the founder was a practicing lawyer and the correspondent of The Hindu the English daily.

Stalwarts of Malayalam news papers like K.C. Mammen Mappila, K.G.Sanker and K.Sukumaran extended all support to the new venture. Many news papers including Mathrubhoomi, Kerala Kaumudi and Malayala Manorama subscribed to the news service. Deepika, Malayaly, Desa Bandhu, Deenabandhu, Keraladhwani, Malabar Mail, Powradhwani, Kerala Bhooshanam, Malayala Rajyam, Prabhatham, Chandrika, Kerala Bandhu, Janayugom, Desabhimani, Express, Kaumudi, Powradhwani, Dinamani, were all subscribers of this news agency for daily news and feature service by 1950.

Keralapress had arrangements in London, New York and Tokyo to cover activities of Keralites who work in these cities and also to cover the news of visits of dignitaries from Kerala to these cities.

== Private Limited Company ==
Keralapress was registered as a private limited company in 1956. Mention of Keralapress is made in many GOI Publications such as 'among other Indian News Agencies are Eastern News Agency and Kerala Press Service.'

Within this period all the Malayalam dailies of Kerala became subscribers of Keralapress of their daily news service. Keralapress is Kerala's own and the only news agency in Malayalam language. Almost all the Malayalam dailies of Kerala including Malayala Manorama, Kerala Kaumudi, Malayala Rajyam, Kaumudi, Prabhatham, Pothujanam, Desabandhu, Deepika, Dinamani, Prakasam through their editorial columns requested the Government the need to encourage Keralapress which provides the needed service to Malayalam news papers.

C. Kesavan, former Chief Minister of Kerala, K.P.Madhavan Nair, Former General Secretary of AICC, also appealed to the Government to encourage this only news agency in Malayalam language. Eminent journalists like C.H.V Pathy and C. Narayana Pillai were regular columnists of Keralapress.

== "Development Journalism" ==
In 1957 the first democratically elected Communist Government of Kerala under the leadership of Chief Minister E.M.S Nampoothiripad recognised it as a news agency and subscribed to the news service. Keralapress is one among many small news agencies in India providing service in regional language. Divakar Committee (1968) appointed by Govt of India to study the problems of small news papers in India commented on the difficulties faced by Keralapress due to non-payment of monthly subscription to the agency by small news papers.

A series of articles released by Keralapress on India's Five Year Plans were published continuously and simultaneously by all Malayalam dailies of Kerala including Kerala Kaumudi, Mathrubhoomi and Malayala Manorama for 25 days in 1965.

It is considered as the first initiative of Malayalam Press in Development Journalism and appreciated by eminent leaders like V.V.Giri, then Governor of Kerala and R. Sanker, former Chief Minister of Kerala. A.M.Nair (Nairsan) and Prof Devassya opened a news bureaus for Keralapress in Tokyo and London and used to send news and features especially on activities of Malayalees who visited these cities.

== Specialised news and features ==
By 1965, Keralapress had 35 dailies (including evening news papers) as its subscribers including an English daily published from Trichur 'Kerala Chronicle'. Specialised News and features on Science, Technology, Cinema, Trade and Commerce were also introduced in its daily news releases by 1962.

During the time Keralapress started providing features to English dailies like 'Christian Science Monitor' in the United States. News and features and interview of prominent personalities on development activities in sectors like health, energy and transportation has been a specialised area of operation for Keralapress.

Developments in science and technology used to be released to the media in 'box items ' making it simple and understandable to commonman, which were well appreciated by the public.

At present the agency has entered into the specialised area of providing news and features on art, culture, cinema and sports of Kerala to foreign news papers in English. The agency is making arrangements to have news bureaux in different countries around the world having presence of Keralites in large numbers.
