= Nadeem Iqbal =

Indian cross-country skier (born 1983)

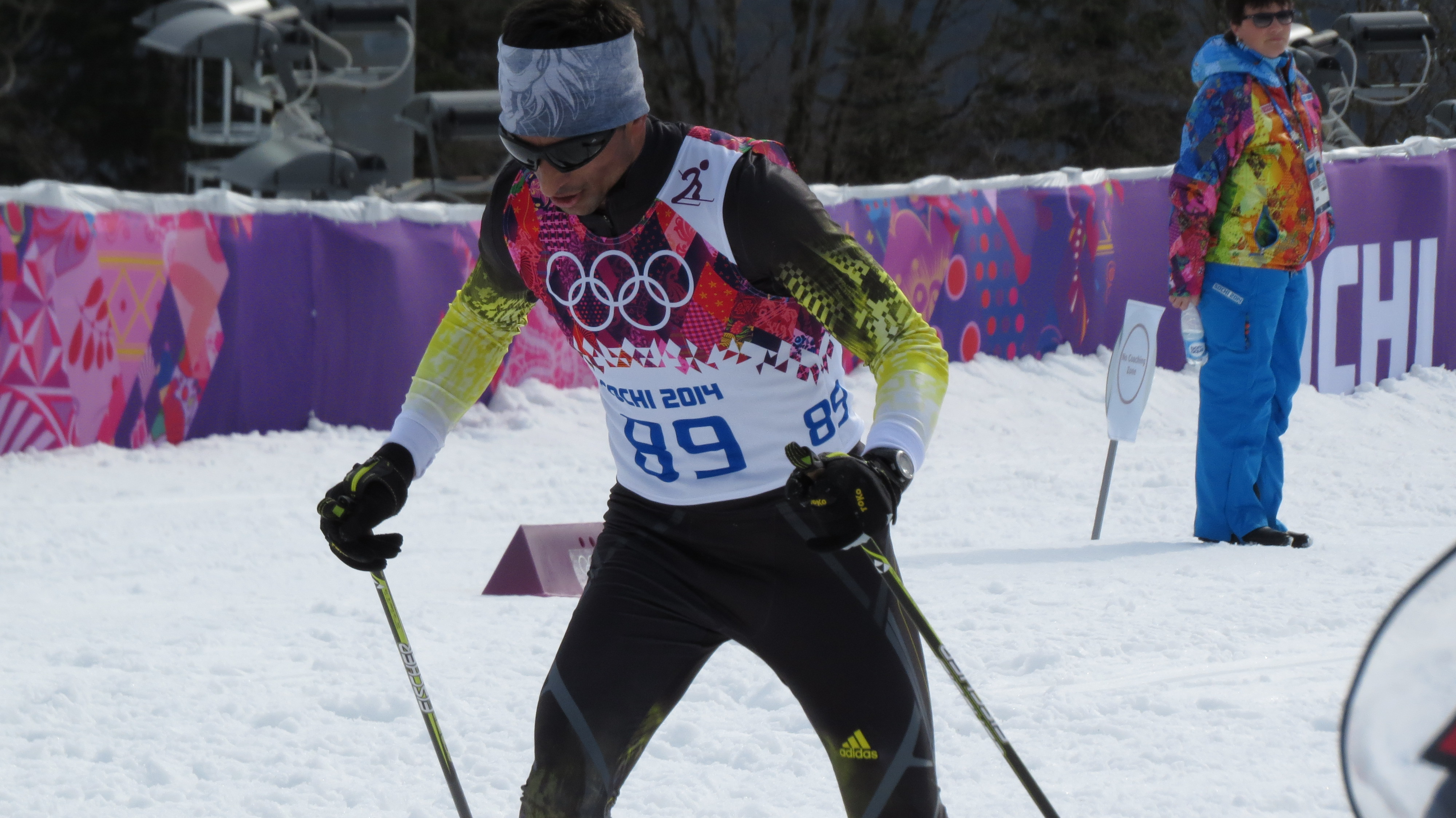
- Iqbal in 2014

Personal information
- Born: 3 April 1983 (age 43) Nowshera, Rajouri district, India

Sport
- Country: India
- Sport: Cross-country skiing
- Now coaching: Jagdish Singh
Medal record
Men's Cross-country skiing
Representing India
South Asian Winter Games
Gold medal – first place	2011 Dehradun and Auli	15 km freestyle

Nadeem Iqbal (born 3 April 1983) is an Indian cross-country skier and military officer. He was born in Rajouri a district in the Jammu division of Jammu and Kashmir in India.

Iqbal competed for India at the 2014 Winter Olympics in the 15 kilometre classical race. Iqbal became the first athlete from Jammu and Kashmir to qualify for the Winter Olympics. Iqbal finished the race in 85th position (out of 92 competitors), nearly 17 minutes behind the winner Dario Cologna of Switzerland.

== See also ==
- India at the 2014 Winter Olympics
