= Neha Ahuja =

Indian alpine skier

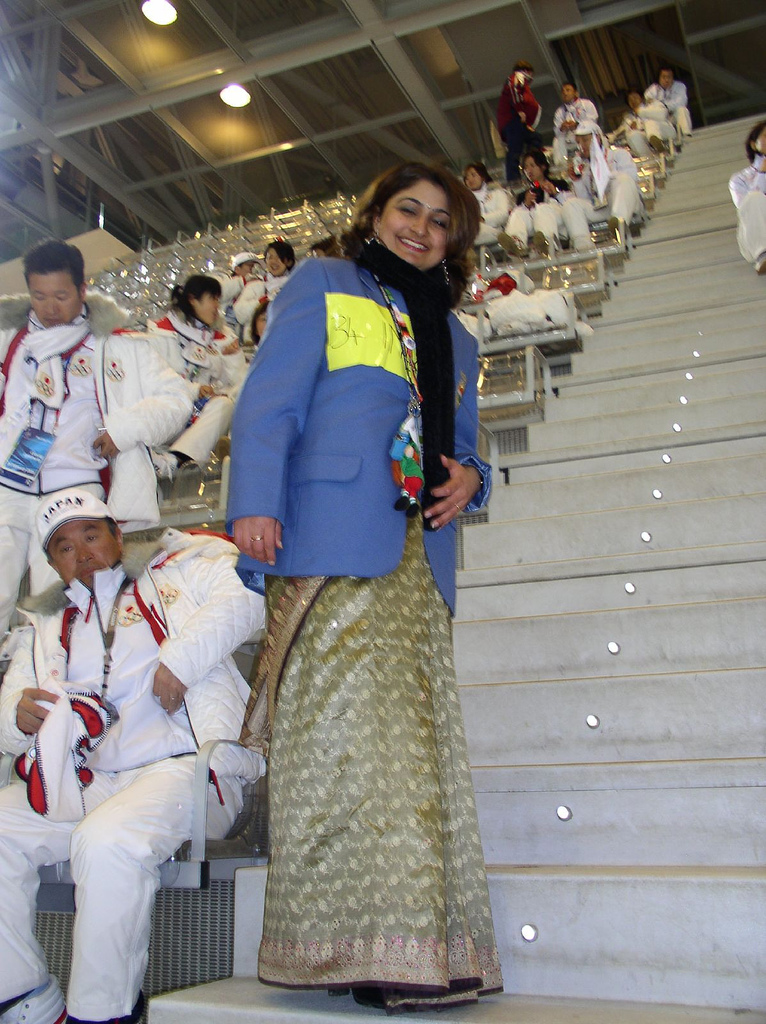

Personal information
- Born: 27 September 1981 (age 45) Delhi, India

Skiing career
- Sport: Alpine skiing
- Disciplines: Slalom, giant slalom

Olympics
- Teams: 1 – (2006)
- Medals: 0

Neha Ahuja (born September 27, 1981) is an Indian former alpine skier who represented India in the 2006 Winter Olympics held in Torino, Italy. Ahuja was also the flag bearer in the opening and closing ceremonies. She has achieved several milestones in skiing for India. She is the first Indian woman to have qualified for the Winter Olympics. She is also the first woman to qualify for both the slalom and giant slalom events in the Olympics. Ahuja was one of four Indians competing at the 2006 Winter Olympics in Turin. She placed 51st in the slalom (SL) and 42nd in the giant slalom (GS) events. Her older sister Shefali Ahuja represented India in the 3rd Winter Asian games held in Harbin, China, and her younger sister Swati Ahuja participated in the fourth season of MTV Roadies.

== Early life ==
Ahuja was born in New Delhi to Anita Ahuja (née Wadhwa) and Comdt. S.P. Ahuja, an officer in the Indian Border Security Force (BSF). Ahuja's father was also the director of winter sports in Gulmarg and was the principal of the Indian Institute of Skiing and Mountaineering. At the age of four, Ahuja and her family moved to Kashmir due to her father's posting, and that was when she first learnt to ski.

In 1994, she participated in a two-week training camp under Otto Santner and Peter Santner at the Thayer Racing Club, Kaprun, Austria, which encouraged her to continue her career as a skier. Soon after, she began training under Kazuo Sato in order to participate in the 1996 Junior Asian Winter Games being held in Japan. At the age of 16, Ahuja moved to Vail, Colorado and trained at the Vail Mountain School for the 2002 Winter Olympics in Salt Lake City, Utah. After sustaining a knee injury that year while training, she could not perform physical activity for six months. As a result, she could not participate in the Salt Lake City Winter Olympics. A year later, however, she competed in the Winter Asian Games (2003).

She then trained under Dietmar Thoni at the Bartsch Race Academy, Pitztal, Austria for the 2006 Winter Olympics.

In 1999, she graduated from Air Force Bal Bharti, and in 2003, she graduated from the University of Colorado Boulder. Additionally, she was a competitive swimmer and swam at the Delhi state level. She was also a national level diver.

== Personal life ==
Ahuja has two sons. She currently works as a Strategy Consultant at a major firm. She now plays tennis and skis recreationally.

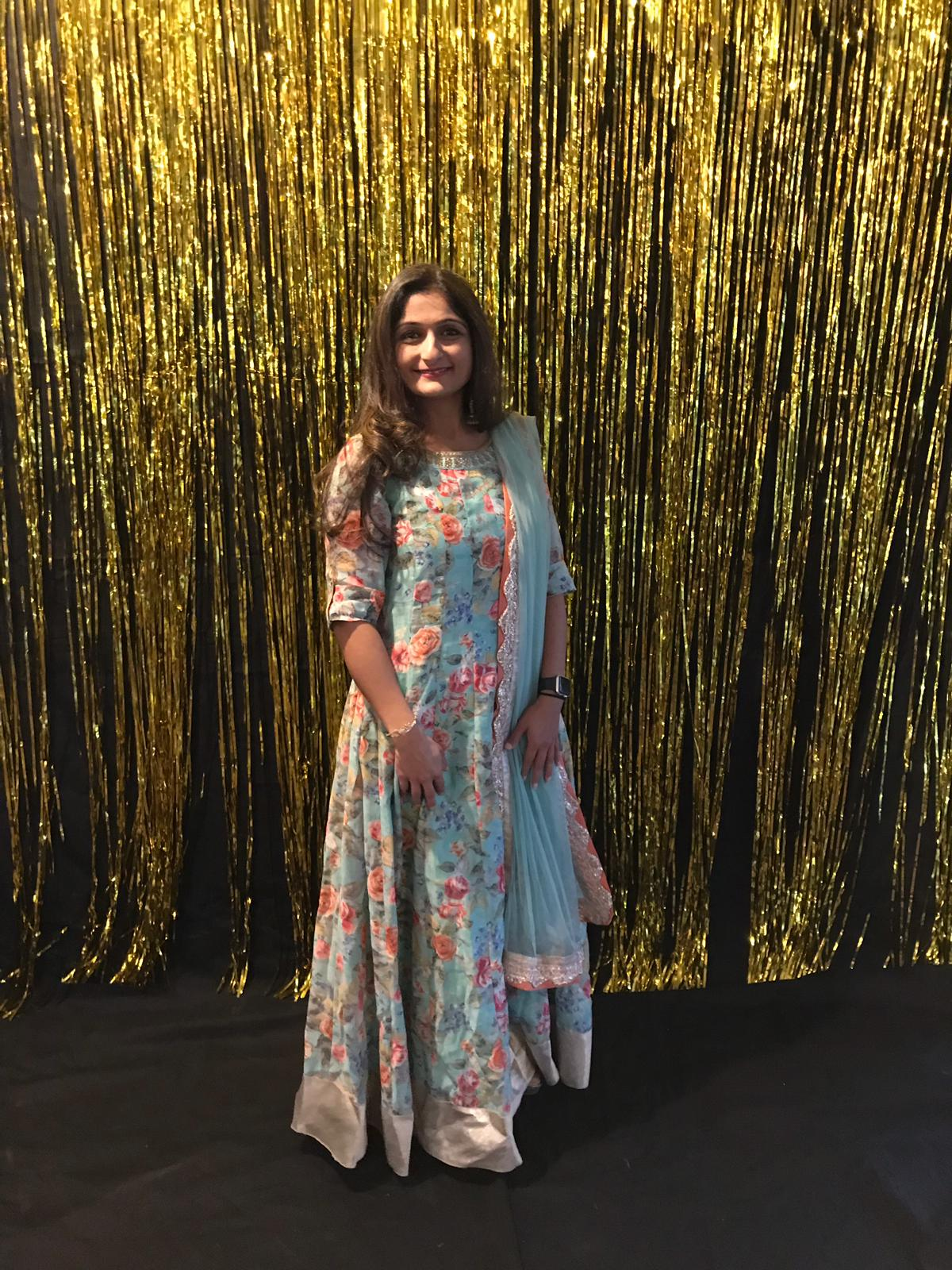
Picture of Neha Ahuja taken in 2019.

== Alpine skiing results ==
All results are sourced from the International Ski Federation (FIS).

=== Olympic results ===
Year
Year	Age	Slalom	Giant; Slalom	Super-G	Downhill	Combined	Team Event
2006	25	51	42	—	—	—	—

Winter Olympics
Preceded by Shiva Keshavan	Flag bearer for India; 2006 Torino	Succeeded by Shiva Keshavan
