= C. G. Kesavan =

Indian journalist

C. G. Kesavan (1895 – 1980) was a veteran journalist of Kerala who worked with many newspapers in south India like Swarajya, Indian Social Reformer, Justice, The Madras Mail, The Hindu and also news agencies like Free Press of India and Associated Press of India. He was a columnist of the Christian Science Monitor published in Boston, USA. Extracts of his reports in The Hindu on police atrocities on freedom fighters in Quilon during freedom struggle were quoted by Mahatma Gandhi in his Young India. He founded Keralapress the Malayalam News Agency when he was working with newspapers in Madras in 1930. He was the correspondent of The Hindu in Quilon till he died in 1980.
