= Kishor Rahtna Rai =

Indian alpine skier (born 1964)

Personal information
- Born: 5 November 1964 (age 61) Darjeeling, West Bengal, India

Skiing career
- Sport: Alpine skiing
- Disciplines: Slalom

Olympics
- Teams: 1 – (1988)
- Medals: 0

Kishor Rahtna Rai (born 5 November 1964) is an Indian alpine skier. He competed in the men's slalom at the 1988 Winter Olympics. Rai was the flagbearer of India at the opening ceremony of the 1988 Winter Olympics.

== Alpine skiing results ==
=== Olympic results ===
Year	Event	Race 1	Race 2	Total	
Year	Event	Time	Time	Time	Rank
1988	Slalom	1:31.42	1:20.79	2:52.21	49

Winter Olympics
Preceded by Jeremy Bujakowski	Flag bearer for India; 1988 Calgary	Succeeded by Shiva Keshavan
