= Tashi Lundup =

Indian cross-country skier

Personal information
- Born: October 5, 1984 (age 41) Leh, Jammu and Kashmir, India (now in Ladakh)
- Occupation: Indian Army athlete

Sport
- Country: India
- Sport: Cross-country skiing

Tashi Lundup (born 5 October 1984) is an Indian cross-country skier who has competed since 2005. He was born in Ladakh in India on 5 October 1984. He finished 83rd in the 15 km event at the 2010 Winter Olympics in Vancouver.

== Career ==
Lundup served in the Ladakh Scouts regiment of the Indian Army. He also finished 114th in the individual sprint event at the FIS Nordic World Ski Championships 2009 in Liberec.

His best career finish was third in a 10 km event at Iran in 2007.
