= Hira Lal (skier) =

Indian skier (born 1980)

Personal information
- Born: 26 November 1980 (age 45) Manali, Himachal Pradesh, India

Skiing career
- Sport: Alpine skiing
- Disciplines: Giant slalom

Olympics
- Teams: 1 – (2006)
- Medals: 0

World Championships
- Teams: 2 – (2015, 2017)
- Medals: 0

Hira Lal (born 26 November 1980) is an Indian alpine skier. He competed in the men's giant slalom at the 2006 Winter Olympics.

== Alpine skiing results ==
All results are sourced from the International Ski Federation (FIS).

=== Olympic results ===
Year
Year	Age	Slalom	Giant; Slalom	Super-G	Downhill	Combined	Team Event
2006	25	—	DNF	—	—	—	—

=== World Championship results ===
Year	Age	Slalom	Giant slalom	Super-G	Downhill	Combined
2015	35	BDNF1	103	—	—	—
2017	37	BDNS1	82	—	—	—
