= Arif Khan (skier) =

Indian alpine skier (born 1990)

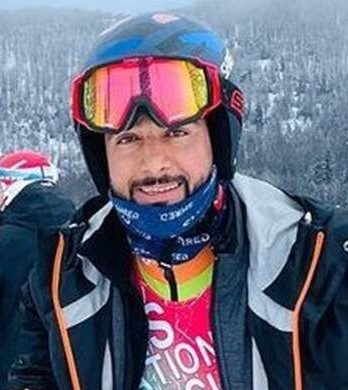
- Khan in 2022

Personal information
- Full name: Arif Mohammad Khan
- Born: 9 March 1990 (age 36) Gulmarg, Jammu & Kashmir, India
- Height: 180 cm (5 ft 11 in) (2025)
- Weight: 82 kg (181 lb) (2025)

Skiing career
- Sport: Alpine skiing
- Disciplines: Slalom, giant slalom

Olympics
- Teams: 2 – (2022, 2026)

World Championships
- Teams: 6 – (2013, 2015, 2019, 2021, 2023, 2025)
- Medals: 0
Medal record
Men's alpine skiing
Representing India
South Asian Winter Games
| Gold medal – first place | 2011 Dehradun and Auli | Giant slalom |
| Gold medal – first place | 2011 Dehradun and Auli | Slalom |

Arif Mohammad Khan (born 9 March 1990) is an Indian alpine skier, who competes in the slalom. In 2011, he won two gold medals: in the slalom and giant slalom Alpine skiing at the South Asian Winter Games.

He represented India at the 2022 Winter Olympics in the slalom and giant slalom events. He finished in the 45th position in the giant slalom event and didn't finish in the slalom event.

He again represented India at the 2026 Winter Olympics in the slalom event in which he finished in the 39th position.

Arif had previously competed at the 2017 Asian Winter Games held in Sapporo.

== Winter Olympics ==
The 31-year-old Arif was the lone Indian competitor at the Games, having qualified in Slalom and giant slalom events. India sent a six-member contingent to the Games including a coach, a technician, and a team manager.

Arif is the first Indian to secure qualification in two events of the same edition of the Games.

Khan’s expectation in Beijing was to ski and make it to the finish line. Khan now has his eyes set on the 2026 Olympics.

Khan was conferred with Jammu and Kashmir government award by The Government of Jammu and Kashmir in the sports category.

== Alpine skiing results ==
All results are sourced from the International Ski Federation (FIS).

=== Olympic results ===
Year
| Year | Age | Slalom | Giant; Slalom | Super-G | Downhill | Combined | Team Event |
| 2022 | 31 | DNF | 45 | — | — | — | — |
| 2026 | 35 | 39 | — | — | — | —N/a | —N/a |

=== World Championship results ===
Year
| Year | Age | Slalom | Giant slalom | Super-G | Downhill | Combined |
| 2013 | 23 | 59 | 91 | — | — | — |
| 2015 | 25 | DNF1 | 101 | — | — | — |
| 2019 | 29 | 79 | 116 | — | — | — |
| 2021 | 31 | BDNF1 | 45 | — | — | — |
| 2023 | 33 | 61 | DNF1 | — | — | — |
| 2025 | 35 | 44 | BDNS1 | — | — | —N/a |

=== Asian Winter Games results ===
Year
| Year | Age | Slalom | Giant slalom | Super-G | Downhill | Combined |
| 2025 | 34 | 25 | — | — | — | — |

== See also ==
- Alpine skiing at the 2022 Winter Olympics – Men's giant slalom
- 2022 Winter Olympics Parade of Nations

Winter Olympics
| Preceded by Shiva Keshavan | Flag bearer for India; 2022 Beijing | Succeeded by Incumbent |
