= Jeremy Bujakowski =

Polish–Indian alpine skier

Personal information
- Full name: Jeremy John Bujakowski
- Born: Jarema Stanisław Bujakowski; March 30, 1939 Druskininkai, Poland
- Died: June 1, 2010 (aged 71) San Bernardino, California, USA

Skiing career
- Sport: Alpine skiing
- Disciplines: Slalom, giant slalom, downhill

Olympics
- Teams: India – (1964, 1968)
- Medals: 0

Jeremy John Bujakowski, also known as Jarema Stanisław Bujakowski (March 30, 1939 – June 1, 2010), was a Polish–Indian alpine skier, and two-time representative of India at the Winter Olympics.

== Personal life ==
He was born in Druskininkai, a city in modern-day Lithuania, to Polish travellers Halina Korolec-Bujakowski and Stanisław Bujakowski, who in the years 1934 to 1936 travelled by motorcycle from Druskininkai to Shanghai. His father had served as a Warrant Officer of the No.101 Repair and Servicing Unit in the Polish Air Force in the UK during World War II.

After spending his childhood at Poland, he came to India at the age of seven in 1946 with his parents where his father was working with a petroleum company. He studied at the St Joseph's North Point, Darjeeling, and graduated from the St Xavier's College, Kolkata, before leaving for the United States for higher studies, following which he got a scholarship at University of Denver.

== Career ==
Jeremy Bujakowski was India's first and sole athlete at the 1964 Winter Olympics in Innsbruck, Austria. He competed in the men's downhill event in Alpine skiing, which he could not finish due to an injury. He returned in 1968 to represent India at the 1968 Winter Olympics in Grenoble, France, in Alpine skiing, competing again in the downhill, slalom, and giant slalom events.

== Alpine skiing ==
=== 1964 Winter Olympics ===
Men's Downhill

Athlete	Event	Race	
Athlete	Event	Time	Rank
Jeremy Bujakowski	Downhill	DNF	–

=== 1968 Winter Olympics ===
Men's Downhill and giant slalom

Athlete	Event	Race 1		Race 2		Total	
Athlete	Event	Time	Rank	Time	Rank	Time	Rank
Jeremy Bujakowski	Downhill					2:11.82	53
Jeremy Bujakowski	Giant slalom	2:01.45	69	2:00.48	63	4:01.93	65

Men's slalom

Athlete	Heat 1		Heat 2		Final					
Athlete	Time	Rank	Time	Rank	Time 1	Rank	Time 2	Rank	Total	Rank
Jeremy Bujakowski	DNF	–	57.78	2	did not advance					

Winter Olympics
Preceded by -	Flag bearer for India; 1964 Innsbruck	Succeeded by Jeremy Bujakowski
Preceded by Jeremy Bujakowski	Flag bearer for India; 1968 Genoble	Succeeded by Kishor Rahtna Rai
