= Shiva Keshavan =

Indian luger (born 1981)

Shiva Keshavan OLY
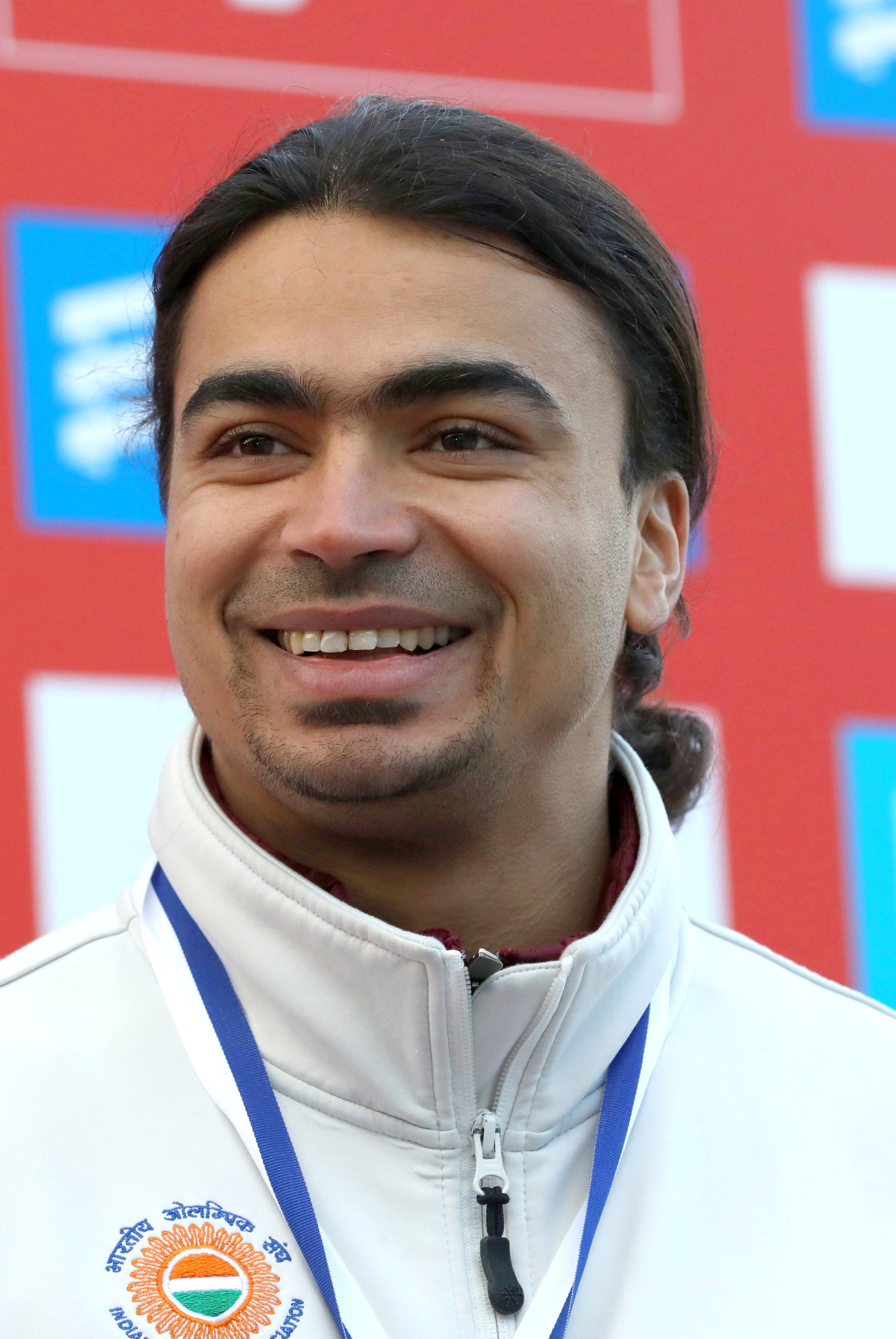
- Keshavan in 2017

Personal information
- Born: 25 August 1981 (age 45) Manali, Himachal Pradesh, India
- Website: website

Sport
- Country: India
- Sport: Luge
- Event: Men´s singles
- Turned pro: 1998

Achievements and titles
- Personal best: 134.3km/h
Medal record
Representing India
Men's luge
Asia Cup, Asian Championship
Gold medal – first place	2017 Altenberg	Men's singles
Gold medal – first place	2016 Nagano	Men's singles
Gold medal – first place	2012 Nagano	Men's singles
Gold medal – first place	2011 Nagano	Men's singles
Silver medal – second place	2015 Nagano	Men's singles
Silver medal – second place	2014 Nagano	Men's singles
Silver medal – second place	2013 Nagano	Men's singles
Silver medal – second place	2009 Nagano	Men's singles
Bronze medal – third place	2008 Nagano	Men's singles
Bronze medal – third place	2005 Nagano	Men's singles

Shiva Keshavan (born 25 August 1981) is an Indian luger. A six-time Olympian, he is the first Indian representative to compete in luge at the Winter Olympic Games. He set a new Asian speed record at 134.3 km/h (83.5 mph) after beating the previous record of 131.9 km/h (82.0 mph) and won a gold medal in the 2011 Asian Luge Cup at Nagano in Japan.

== Career ==
Keshavan skied as a child and won the Junior National Ski Championship in 1995 at the age of 14. At the age of 15, he attended a luge camp at his school conducted by world champion Günther Lemmerer. Keshavan was selected as a promising young athlete and went on to become the youngest person to ever officially qualify for the Olympic Games in luge, attending the 1998 Nagano games at the age of 16.

In 2014, Keshavan walked as an Independent Olympic Participant at the Winter Olympics opening ceremony in Sochi due to the suspension of the Indian Olympic Association. However, later on during the Sochi Winter Olympics, Indian Olympic Association made a comeback as a recognized country by the International Olympic Committee resulting in Keshavan competing under the Indian flag.

Beginning in November 2014, Keshavan collaborated with Duncan Kennedy to train for 2018 PyeongChang Winter Olympics. Duncan acted as Keshavan's personal coach while leveraging his technical expertise to improve Keshavan's sled.

Keshavan qualified for his sixth and final Olympics in 2018, where he finished 34th out of 40 athletes in the men's singles event.

In 2014 Shiva Keshavan became the founder-president of the Olympians Association of India and is committed to support the Olympic movement in India.

In 2020, Keshavan was appointed as the chief coach and the High-Performance Director of the national luge team by the Luge Federation of India.

Shiva now aims at promoting Winter Games in India, and creating an ecosystem to produce more athletes competing at the highest level.

== Training ==
In 2002, the Italian luge team offered Keshavan full use of their coaches and training facilities if he competed under the Italian flag, but he did not take the offer, insisting he wanted to continue representing India. "For me the dream was to get the Olympics to my hometown, and that was the only reason I was doing it. To show that we are also here."

Keshavan often speaks in interviews about his struggles to finance his career. Early in his career, he would borrow sleds for his races. After landing in Montreal for the 2002 games, he hitchhiked to Salt Lake City. In 2006, he did not compete for two seasons due to running out of funds. Keshavan gets most of his money from crowdfunding on the Internet and in the 2014 Sochi games, his uniform bore the names of 50,000 donors.

== Personal life ==
Keshavan is the son of an Indian father from Kerala and an Italian mother, who met while backpacking in the Himalayas in the 1970s. His parents run an Italian restaurant in Himachal Pradesh. He was born and brought up in Manali, Himachal Pradesh and attended The Lawrence School, Sanawar. He married Namita Agarwal, a former classmate at school, who is also his sports manager. The couple have a daughter. He studied humanities and political science at the University of Florence and received a master's degree in International relations from the University of Florence.

Keshavan spends time promoting the cause of winter sports in India; a grassroots level luge camp was held in India by Keshavan in 2009 for young athletes interested in trying the sport. Ten were selected to form the Junior National Luge team to train in Japan. Since then, around 200 Indian children have attended his training camps, and after retiring from competition Keshavan plans to focus on recruiting new Indian winter athletes.

== Awards and achievements ==
- Arjuna Award, Government of India - 2020 - First Winter Sport athlete to win the award
- NDTV Outstanding performer of the year award- winner, 2012
- Asian Luge cup – Gold Medal, 2011 & 2012
- Asian Luge cup – Silver Medal, 2009
- Asian Luge cup – Bronze Medal, 2005 & 2008
- Youngest luge Olympian in history - 1998 Winter Olympics
- First Indian luger to qualify for the Winter Olympic Games
- President of Olympians Association of India
- Member of Athletes' Commission and Ethics Committee with Indian Olympic Association
- Member of State Sports Council, Himachal Pradesh
- Past WADA Ambassador

== 2018 Pyeongchang Winter Olympics results ==
Athlete	Event	Run 1		Run 2		Run 3		Run 4		Total	
Athlete	Event	Time	Rankings	Time	Rankings	Time	Rankings	Time	Rankings	Time	Rankings
Shiva Keshavan	Men's singles	50.578	36	48.710	31	48.900	30	Eliminated		2:28.188	34

== Popular culture ==
Keshavan gained some fame after a training session during which he fell off his sled and yet managed to climb back on and complete the run; the video of the training run was shared widely on the internet.

Winter Olympics
Preceded by Kishor Rahtna Rai	Flag bearer for India; 1998 Nagano	Succeeded by Shiva Keshavan
Preceded by Shiva Keshavan	Flag bearer for India; 2002 Salt Lake	Succeeded by Neha Ahuja
Preceded by Neha Ahuja	Flag bearer for India; 2010 Vancouver	Succeeded by Shiva Keshavan
Preceded by Shiva Keshavan	Flag bearer for India; 2018 Pyeongchang	Succeeded by Arif Khan
