= Independent Olympic Participants at the 2014 Winter Olympics =

- IOC code: IOP

in Sochi, Russia
- Competitors: 1 in 1 sport
- Flag bearer (opening): Volunteer
- Flag bearer (closing): Did not participate
- Medals: Gold 0 Silver 0 Bronze 0 Total 0

Winter Olympics appearances (overview)
- 2014; 2018; 2022; 2026

Other related appearances
- India (1964–pres.)

Three athletes from India qualified for the 2014 Winter Olympics in Sochi, Russia held between 7 and 23 February 2014. They initially entered the competition as Independent Olympic Participants due to the ongoing suspension of India's national olympic committee (NOC), the Indian Olympic Association since 2012. However, on 11 February 2014, the IOC reinstated India's NOC, allowing two athletes with pending events to represent India at the 2014 Winter Olympics instead. Shiva Keshavan, participating in Luge, was thus the only independent athlete at the 2014 Winter Olympics.

== Background ==
India's National Olympic Committee, the Indian Olympic Association, was suspended by the International Olympic Committee due to government interference in the autonomy of the country's NOC in December 2012. It was announced on 31 December 2013 that India would be competing under the Olympic flag in Sochi. Elections by the Indian Olympic Association were scheduled two days after the opening ceremony, which would not provide enough time for the suspension to be lifted. The IOC ultimately reinstated the Indian Olympic Association on 11 February after Narayana Ramachandran, the president of the World Squash Federation, was voted in as its new president. While Shiva Keshavan had already competed in his events as an Independent Olympic Participant, two athletes who still had their events pending represented India at the 2014 Winter Olympics; this was the first time such a reinstatement of a NOC occurred as an Olympic Games were underway.

== Luge ==
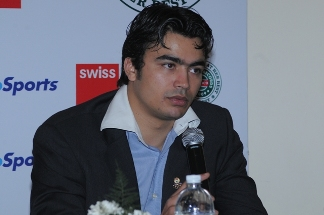
Shiva Keshavan finished 37th in the men's singles luge event.

India qualified a place in the men's singles when Shiva Keshavan finished in the top 40 (with a maximum of three per nation qualifying) during the 2013–14 Luge World Cup. As the event was held during the first weekend of the Games, Keshavan had to compete as an Independent Olympic Participant. Keshavan finished the four runs of the event in 37th position out of 39, marking his worst ever performance at the Winter Olympics.

Athlete	Event	Run 1		Run 2		Run 3		Run 4		Total	
Athlete	Event	Time	Rank	Time	Rank	Time	Rank	Time	Rank	Time	Rank
Shiva Keshavan	Men's singles	53.905	35	55.203	38	54.706	37	53.335	34	3:37.149	37
