= ABU Robocon =

Asian Oceanian College robot competition

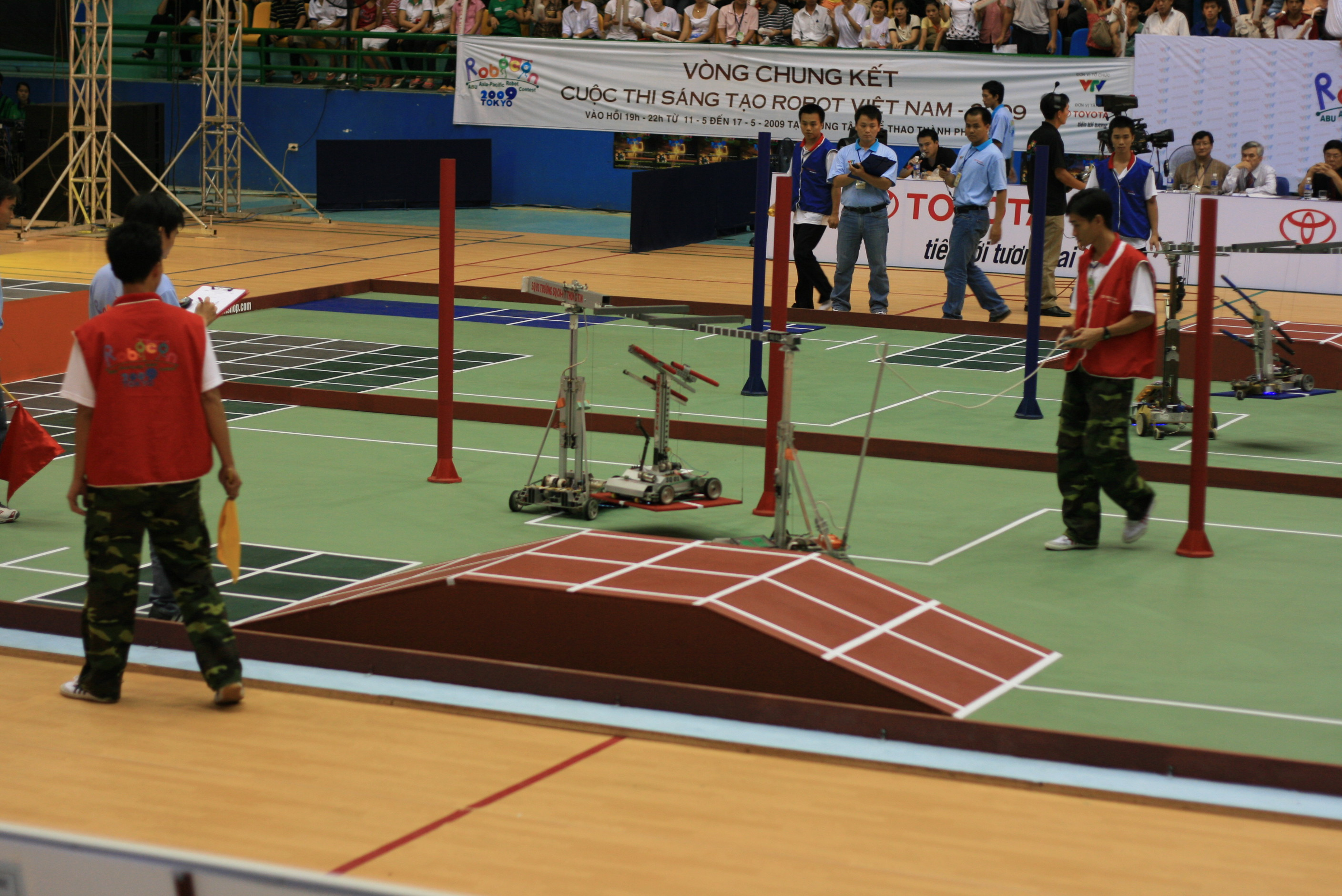
Vietnamese qualifiers of ABU Robocon 2009

The ABU Asia-Pacific Robot Contest, commonly known as ABU Robocon, is an Asian-Oceanian college robot competition, founded in 2002 by Asia-Pacific Broadcasting Union. In the competition robots compete to complete a task within a set period of time. The contest aims to build friendship among young people with similar interests who will lead their countries in the 21st century, as well as help advance engineering and broadcasting technologies in the region. The event is broadcast in many countries through ABU member broadcasters.

== History and format ==
ABU Robocon extended the concept from NHK Robocon which started in 1991 and restricted to teams from Japan only.

Each year the competition has different topics, but generally speaking, two or more robots must be used to complete the tasks. One of the robots would be manually controlled while the others are automatic. The best robots usually weight more than 10 kg and span an area of one square meter. To build the robots, contestants, who are restricted to be undergraduate students, must possess rich knowledge in programming, mechanical design and electronic circuit design.

The theme and rules for each year are determined by the host country. Participating countries organize national qualifying contests to select their representative teams for the final competition. The host country is granted the special privilege of entering two teams in the final.

Each match is played between two teams, commonly designated as red and blue. The playing field is symmetrical, and both teams’ robots begin under the same conditions, with the exception of Robocon 2015, which used a turn-based format inspired by badminton, and Robocon 2025, which is based on basketball.

A typical match (excluding Robocon 2015 and Robocon 2025) lasts three minutes but may end earlier if a team achieves a “K.O.” victory, which immediately concludes the game. If neither team achieves this condition, the team with the higher score at the end of the three minutes is declared the winner.

Earlier editions of Robocon tend to emphasize the competitiveness of the game, in which winners achieve their win by employing strategic approaches to deploy their robots as well as preventing their opponent from reaching the goal. Vietnam's win in ABU Robocon 2004 and 2006, as well as China's victory in ABU Robocon 2008 demonstrated this strategy. To mitigate the problems, later editions reduce the combat nature and put more emphasis on technology, designing and making the robot perform complicated maneuvers, which require teams to be more creative on designing robots.

== Competitions ==
=== ABU Robocon 2027 ===
ABU Robocon will be held in Solo, Indonesia. The theme is based on "The Pursuit of Mustika Nusantara" where to accomplish this task, teams must design machines that combine raw lifting strength with sophisticated automation. There are two robots, the Transporter Robot(TR) which acts as the agile gatherer, navigating the lower terrain to harvest the heavy Earth Blocks and delivering them to the teams designated transfer zone. Next the Builder robot (BR), a fully autonomous robot which acts as the master architect which is actually supposed to stack the foundations and rebuild the lost pillars sealing the energy circuit by placing the crowning Sky Block at the very top. Which is then enshrined by the Mustika orb. This grueling, three-minute marathon is designed to test each teams robots and their ability to conduct this task.

=== ABU Robocon 2026 ===
ABU Robocon 2026 was held in Hong Kong. The theme is based on Kung-Fu, with each team building 2 robots R1 and R2.

=== ABU Robocon 2025 ===
ABU Robocon 2025 was held on 24 August 2025 at the ASA Arena, located in Ulaanbaatar, Mongolia. The theme based on basketball, with each team fielding two robots for gameplay. A total of 14 teams from 13 countries participated. The team from Japan was the champion.

Unlike previous editions, the game time is regulated to be 120 seconds for preliminary round matches, and 160 seconds for knockout round matches.

=== ABU Robocon 2024 ===
The competition was held in Quảng Ninh, Vietnam on 25 August 2024. Total 13 teams from 12 countries participated. The team from Hong Kong crowned the Grand Prix title, while the Vietnam 1 team was the first runner-up.

The theme was "Harvest Day". It was related to Vietnamese's rice cultivation on terraced fields.

=== ABU Robocon 2023 ===
ABU Robocon 2023 took place in Phnom Penh, Cambodia on 27 August 2023. The themes were "Casting flowers over Angkor Wat" and "Throwing rings into poles". Total 14 teams from 13 countries participated. The team from Japan was the champion, and the Hong Kong team finished second.

=== ABU Robocon 2022 ===
ABU Robocon 2022 was scheduled at Delhi, India and the game will be based on the game of lagori. In this game, two teams will design two robots, with each team will take turn playing as seeker and hitter. The seeker's first robot will first break the pile of stones using three small balls. Then the seeker's second robot will rebuild the pile of stones, but it also carries a ball on its head. The hitter's robot would attempt to throw their own balls to dislodge the ball on the seeker's head, and the round immediately ends once they succeeded. The team scores points based on the number of stones they displaced and then rebuilt, with the teams scoring more points declared the winner.

=== ABU Robocon 2021 ===
ABU Robocon 2021 was originally scheduled at Jimo, China and the game was based on the traditional game of East Asian countries pitch-pot, or throwing arrows to a pot. In this game, each team designs two robots. One robot can pick up arrows and throw them to the five pots located on the field, but is restricted to the outer area of the field. The other robot, in addition to throwing arrows from the outer area, can navigate through both the outer and inner area of the field, rotating pots, blocking throwing attempts of the opponent, or handing leftover arrows on the field to the first robot. Team scores point based on the number of arrows thrown into each pot, but if a team got the arrow to all five pots, they will achieve the K.O victory which immediately ends the game.

Due to the COVID-19 pandemic, the onsite contest was not held. The participants instead did a demonstration run of their robots at their local universities as a one-player game.

=== ABU Robocon 2020 ===
ABU Robocon 2020 was originally scheduled to host in Suva, Fiji and the game will be based on Fiji's national sport rugby. The theme is "ROBO RUGBY 7s", in this game, each team designs two robots, one as pass robot, and another as try robot. Each can either be manual or automated. The pass robot will pick up the rugby balls, and the try robot needs to either place them to the trying spot, or to kick the ball passing through a pole. Team scores points depending on the step and the zone location, but points can be awarded to the opponent's team if the kicking ball lands on the opponent's zone. The game ends when three minutes had passed, or when all seven kicking balls (shared for both teams) have been kicked.

Due to the COVID-19 pandemic, the contest, originally scheduled in August 2020, was postponed. An online event was instead scheduled in December 2020, where teams gave presentations of their robot design, and judges give out votes to select the winner. The University of Tokyo won the contest.

=== ABU Robocon 2019 ===
ABU Robocon 2019 was held at Ulaanbaatar, Mongolia on 25 August 2019. The theme was "Sharing the knowledge". It was related to the Urtuu system of Mongolian tradition. Total 17 teams from 16 different countries participated in this Competition. The Hong Kong, China team won the grand Prix, While Mongolia Team 1 was first runner up.

=== ABU Robocon 2018 ===
The competition was held in Ninh Bình, Vietnam on 26 August 2018. The theme was ném còn (lit. 'throwing shuttlecock'), coming from a traditional game in the Northwest region of Vietnam. The Vietnam team 2 from Lạc Hồng University was the winner of ABU Robocon 2018.

=== ABU Robocon 2017 ===
The ABU Robocon 2017 was held at Tokyo, Japan on 27 August 2017. The theme was "The Landing Disc". Total 19 teams from 18 countries participated. The winner of ABU Robocon 2017 was the team from Lạc Hồng University (Vietnam), while the Malaysian team was the first runner-up.

=== ABU Robocon 2016 ===
The 2016 ABU Robocon was held at Bangkok, Thailand. The theme was "Clean Energy Recharging the World", whose concept behind was the utilization of renewable energy sources. The match was between two teams, each team was consisted of two robots. After a controversial final match (which required a replay), the team from University of Technology Malaysia won the ABU Robocon 2016.

=== ABU Robocon 2015 ===
The ABU Robocon 2015 was held on 23 August 2015 in Yogyakarta, Indonesia. The contest theme was "Robominton-Badminton RoboGame". The venue for the contest was Sportorium of Universitas Muhammadiyah Yogyakarta (UMY). In the contest, the two teams made two robots to play the badminton game against each other. The team from Hung Yen University of Technology and Education, Vietnam won the ABU Robocon 2015.

=== ABU Robocon 2014 ===
The ABU Robocon 2014 was held on 24 August 2014 in Pune, India. The theme was "A Salute for Parenthood". The winner of ABU Robocon 2014 was LH-NVN, coming from Lạc Hồng University, Vietnam.

=== ABU Robocon 2013 ===
The ABU Robocon 2013 was held in Danang, Vietnam on 18 August 2013. 19 teams from 18 countries participated. The theme was "The Green Planet". The winner of ABU Robocon 2013 was Kanazawa Institute of Technology coming from Japan.

=== ABU Robocon 2012 ===
The ABU Robocon 2012 was held in Hong Kong on 19 August 2012 where 17 teams from 16 countries or regions participated. The theme declared by Hong Kong was "Peng On Dai Gat, In Pursuit of Peace and Prosperity". The winner was the team from University of Electronic Science and Technology of China.

=== ABU Robocon 2011 ===
The ABU Robocon 2011 was held in Bangkok, Thailand on 28 August 2011 where 19 teams from 18 countries participated. Russian and Laotian teams competed for the first time. The theme was declared by Thailand as "Loy Krathong, Lighting Happiness with Friendship". The winner was the team from Dhurakij Pundit University, coming from the host country.

=== ABU Robocon 2010 ===
The ABU Robocon 2010 was held in Cairo, Egypt on 21 September 2010. 17 teams from 16 countries participated. The theme was declared by Egypt as "Robo-Pharaohs Build Pyramids". The Chinese team from University of Electronic Science and Technology of China was the champion.

=== ABU Robocon 2009 ===
The ABU Robocon 2009 was held in Tokyo, Japan on 22 August 2009. 20 teams from 19 countries competed. Japan declared the theme as "Travel Together for the Victory Drums". The winner was the team from Harbin Institute of Technology, China. It was the third successive win for China in ABU Robocon.

=== ABU Robocon 2008 ===
The ABU Robocon 2008 was held at Maharashtra Institute of Technology (MIT), Pune, India on 31 August 2008. Total 17 teams from 16 countries participated. The theme was Govinda, based on a mythological story of Lord Krishna (a Hindu god) and the annual Dahi Handi festival in Northern India. The team from Xi'an Jiaotong University, China was the champion.

== Results ==
| Year | Host city | Theme | Grand Prix | 1st Runner-up | ABU Robocon Award |
|---|---|---|---|---|---|
| 2002 | (Japan) Tokyo | Reach for the Top of Mount Fuji | (Vietnam) Ho Chi Minh City University of Technology | University of Science and Technology of China | (Japan) Kanazawa Institute of Technology |
| 2003 | (Thailand) Bangkok | Takraw Space Conqueror | (Thailand) Sawangdandin Industrial and Community Education College | (Thailand) King Mongkut's Institute of Technology Ladkrabang | (South Korea) Chungnam National University |
| 2004 | (South Korea) Seoul | Reunion of Separated Lovers, Gyeonwu & Jiknyeo | (Vietnam) Ho Chi Minh City University of Technology | (China) Southwest University of Science and Technology | (Mongolia) Mongolian University of Science and Technology |
| 2005 | (China) Beijing | Climb on the Great Wall Light the Holy Fire | (Japan) University of Tokyo | (China) University of Science and Technology Beijing | (Egypt) Higher Technological Institute, 10th of Ramadan City |
| 2006 | (Malaysia) Kuala Lumpur | Building the World's Tallest Twin Tower | (Vietnam) Ho Chi Minh City University of Technology | (Thailand) Samut Songkhram Technical College | Universiti Teknologi Malaysia |
| 2007 | (Vietnam) Hanoi | Hạ Long Bay Discovery | (China) Xi'an Jiaotong University | (Indonesia) Electronic Engineering Polytechnic Institute of Surabaya | (Egypt) Higher Technological Institute, 10th of Ramadan City |
| 2008 | (India) Pune | Govinda | (China) Xi'an Jiaotong University | (Egypt) Higher Technological Institute, 10th of Ramadan City | (China) Xi'an Jiaotong University |
| 2009 | (Japan) Tokyo | Travel Together for the Victory Drums | (China) Harbin Institute of Technology | University of Hong Kong | (China) Harbin Institute of Technology |
| 2010 | (Egypt) Cairo | Robo-Pharaohs built pyramids | University of Electronic Science and Technology of China | (Vietnam) Lạc Hồng University | (Egypt) Higher Technological Institute, 10th of Ramadan City |
| 2011 | (Thailand) Bangkok | Loy Krathong, Lighting Happiness with friendship | (Thailand) Dhurakij Pundit University | (Thailand) Kamphaengphet Technical College | (Japan) University of Tokyo |
| 2012 | Hong Kong | Peng On Dai Gat (In pursuit of peace and prosperity) | University of Electronic Science and Technology of China | (Vietnam) Lạc Hồng University | (Japan) University of Tokyo |
| 2013 | (Vietnam) Da Nang | The Green Planet | (Japan) Kanazawa Institute of Technology | (Vietnam) Lạc Hồng University | (Indonesia) Electronic Engineering Polytechnic Institute of Surabaya |
| 2014 | (India) Pune | A Salute for Parenthood | (Vietnam) Lạc Hồng University | (Japan) Nagoya Institute of Technology | (Vietnam) Lạc Hồng University |
| 2015 | (Indonesia) Yogyakarta | Robominton | (Vietnam) Hung Yen University of Technology and Education | Hong Kong University of Science and Technology | (Vietnam) Hung Yen University of Technology and Education |
| 2016 | (Thailand) Bangkok | Clean Energy Recharging the World | Universiti Teknologi Malaysia | (China) Northeastern University | (Japan) University of Tokyo |
| 2017 | (Japan) Tokyo | The Landing Disc | (Vietnam) Lạc Hồng University | Universiti Teknologi Malaysia | (Vietnam) Lạc Hồng University |
| 2018 | (Vietnam) Ninh Bình | "NÉM CÒN" The Festival Wishing Happiness & Prosperity | (Vietnam) Lạc Hồng University (Note: Competed as Team Vietnam 2) | (China) Northeastern University | (Japan) University of Tokyo |
| 2019 | (Mongolia) Ulaanbaatar | Share the knowledge | Chinese University of Hong Kong | (Mongolia) Mongolian University of Science and Technology | (Vietnam) Lạc Hồng University |
| 2020 | (Fiji) Suva (Note: Online contested due to COVID-19 pandemic) | Robo Rugby 7s | (Japan) University of Tokyo | Hong Kong University of Science and Technology | Hong Kong University of Science and Technology (best presentation) |
| 2021 | (China) Jimo | Throwing arrows into pots | (Indonesia) Sepuluh Nopember Institute of Technology | (Mongolia) Mongolian University of Science and Technology | (China) Wuhan University |
| 2022 | (India) New Delhi | Lagori | Chinese University of Hong Kong | (Indonesia) Sepuluh Nopember Institute of Technology | University of Electronic Science and Technology of China |
| 2023 | (Cambodia) Phnom Penh | Casting Flowers over Angkor Wat | (Japan) Toyohashi University of Technology | Chinese University of Hong Kong | (Japan) Toyohashi University of Technology |
| 2024 | (Vietnam) Quảng Ninh | Harvest Day | Chinese University of Hong Kong | (Vietnam) Hung Yen University of Technology and Education (Note: Competed as Team Vietnam 1) | (Vietnam) Hung Yen University of Technology and Education |
| 2025 | (Mongolia) Ulaanbaatar | Robot Basketball | (Japan) University of Tokyo | University of Hong Kong | (Vietnam) Lạc Hồng University |
| 2026 | Hong Kong | Kung Fu Quest | University of Hong Kong | Chinese University of Hong Kong | University of Electronic Science and Technology of China |
| 2027 | (Indonesia) Solo | The Pursuit Of Mustika Nusantara | | | |
| 2028 | TBA | | | | |

=== Winners of ABU Robocon ===
| Country/Territory | Titles | Year(s) |
|---|---|---|
| Vietnam | 7 | 2002, 2004, 2006, 2014, 2015, 2017, 2018 |
| China | 5 | 2007, 2008, 2009, 2010, 2012 |
| Japan | 5 | 2005, 2013, 2020, 2023, 2025 |
| Hong Kong | 4 | 2019, 2022, 2024, 2026 |
| Thailand | 2 | 2003, 2011 |
| Indonesia | 1 | 2021 |
| Malaysia | 1 | 2016 |

== See also ==
- Robocon India
