= Robocon India =

Asia-Pacific robotic competition

The Robocon India is an Indian robotic competition organized by Doordarshan, the India's national public service broadcaster. It is contested every year and the winning team will represent India at the international competition.

== History ==
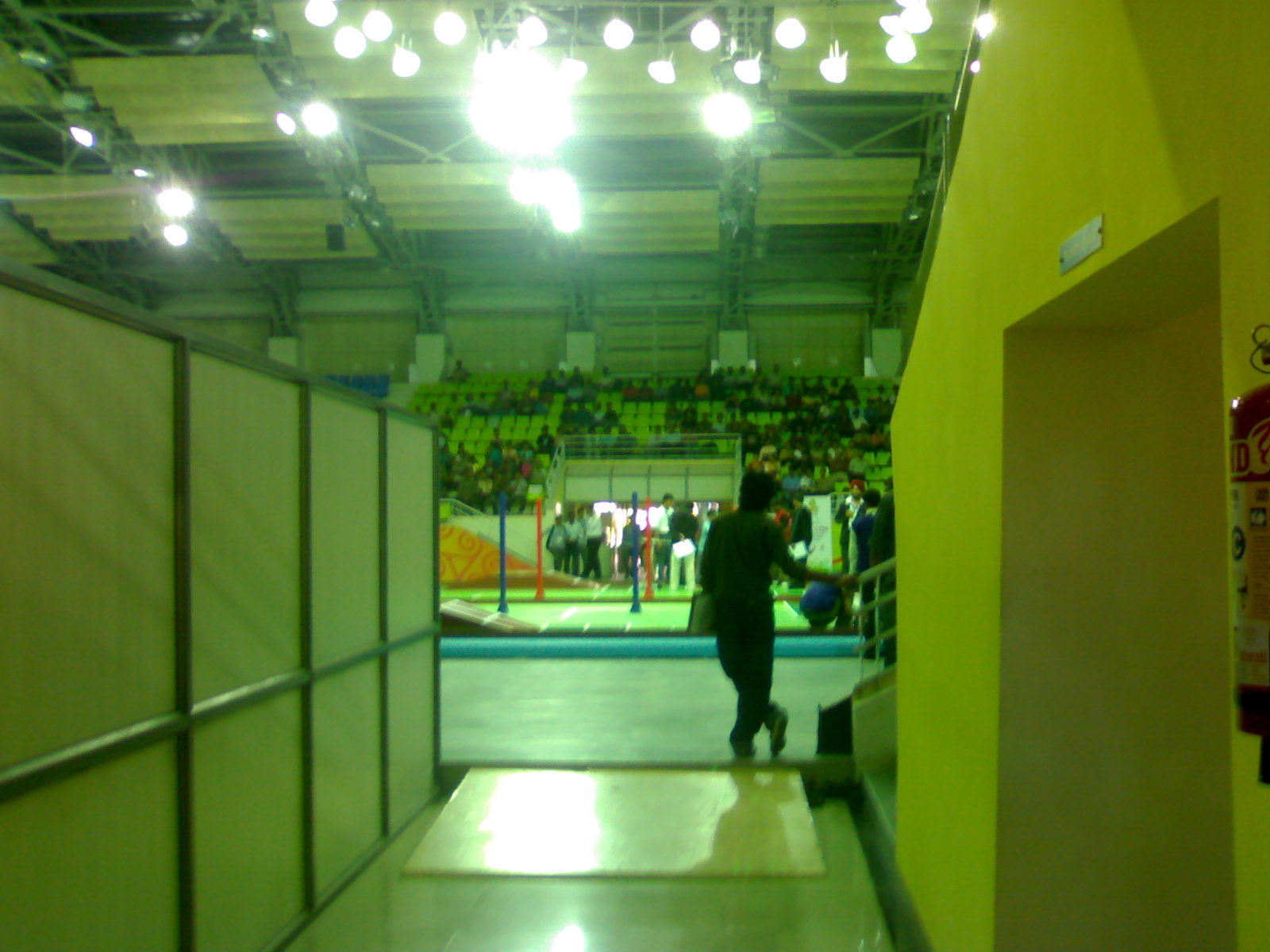
Robocon India 2009

First Robocon India contest was held in 2002, in which only four teams from three colleges had participated at IIT Kanpur. Going from strength to strength, this number has reached 66 in Indian National Robocon 2012 and 107 in 2018 held at the Boxing Arena of Shree Shiv Chhatrapati Sports Complex, Balewadi, Pune.

Mumbai Doordarshan Kendra organised Robocon India from 2005 to 2018. The initiative was taken by Mr Mukesh Sharma, the Director of Doordarshan Kendra Mumbai.

== Format ==
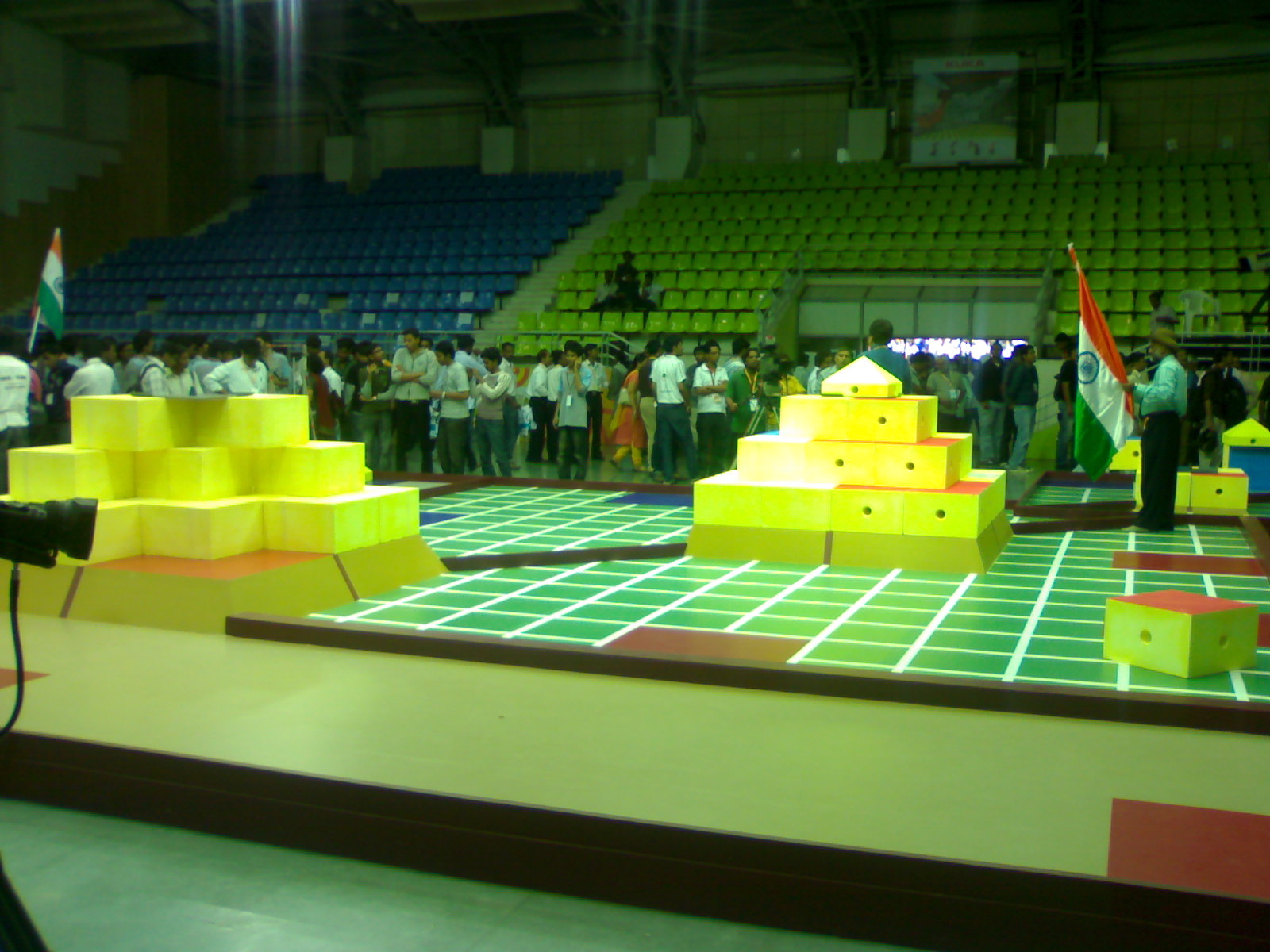
Robocon India 2010

Every year finals of Robocon India are held on First Saturday of March. The best engineering institutes across the country compete with each other for the honour of representing Indian National team at the International version of the competition for three gruelling days.

Elimination rounds are held on days preceding the First Saturday of March. This routine schedule been fixed in India through mutual consultations of participating colleges and Doordarshan of India. International Contests are held in August every year when the national contests of all the countries have been completed and their representatives selected. The host country has the privilege of fielding two teams. India hosted its first international contest in August 2008 in the MIT Sports grounds, Pune. In 2014 again, India hosted the international contest on 24 August. For the last four years the National Robotics Championship has been organized in the famous Shree Shiv Chhatrapati Sports Complex, Mahalunge, Balewadi, Pune.

== ABU Robocon ==
The ABU Robocon ("Robocon" stand for Robotic Contest) is organised by the Asia-Pacific Broadcasting Union (ABU), a collection of over 20 countries of Asia Pacific Region. NHK, Japan had already been organising such contests at national level and also became the host of the first ABU Robocon in 2002. Since then, every year one of the member broadcasters hosts this international event.

The broadcasters of each participant country are responsible for conduct of their national contests to select the team which will represent their country in the International Contest. Teams from engineering and technological colleges are eligible for participation. Participating Teams are expected to design and fabricate their own robots and organize their teams including an Instructor, Team Leader, Manual Robot Operator and an Automatic Robot Operator.

== Recent competitions ==
=== Robocon India 2023 ===
Gujarat Technological University won the Robocon India 2023 and represented India in ABU Robocon 2023, which was organized by Cambodia on 27 August 2023.

DD Robocon 2023 Qualification Matches
| Match | Team 1 | Team 2 | Score (Team 1) | Score (Team 2) |
|---|---|---|---|---|
| 1 | LD College of Engineering | Government College of Engineering and Research, Avasari Khurd | 220 | 30 |
| 2 | Gujarat Technological University | Parul Institute of Technology | 220 | 20 |
| 3 | MIT World Peace University | SRM Institute of Science and Technology | 150 | 0 |
| 4 | Parul Institute of Technology | U. V. Patel College of Engineering | 110 | 0 |
| 5 | Government College of Engineering and Research, Avasari Khurd | JSPM Rajarshi Shahu College of Engineering and Research | 120 | 0 |
| 6 | Institute of Technology, Nirma University | Padmabhooshan Vasantdada Patil Institute of Technology ,Pune | 120 | 70 |
| 7 | College of Engineering, Pune | MIT World Peace University | 100 | 120 |
| 8 | BRACT Vishwakarma Institute of Technology | Institute of Technology, Nirma University | 100 | 120 |

=== Robocon India 2022 ===
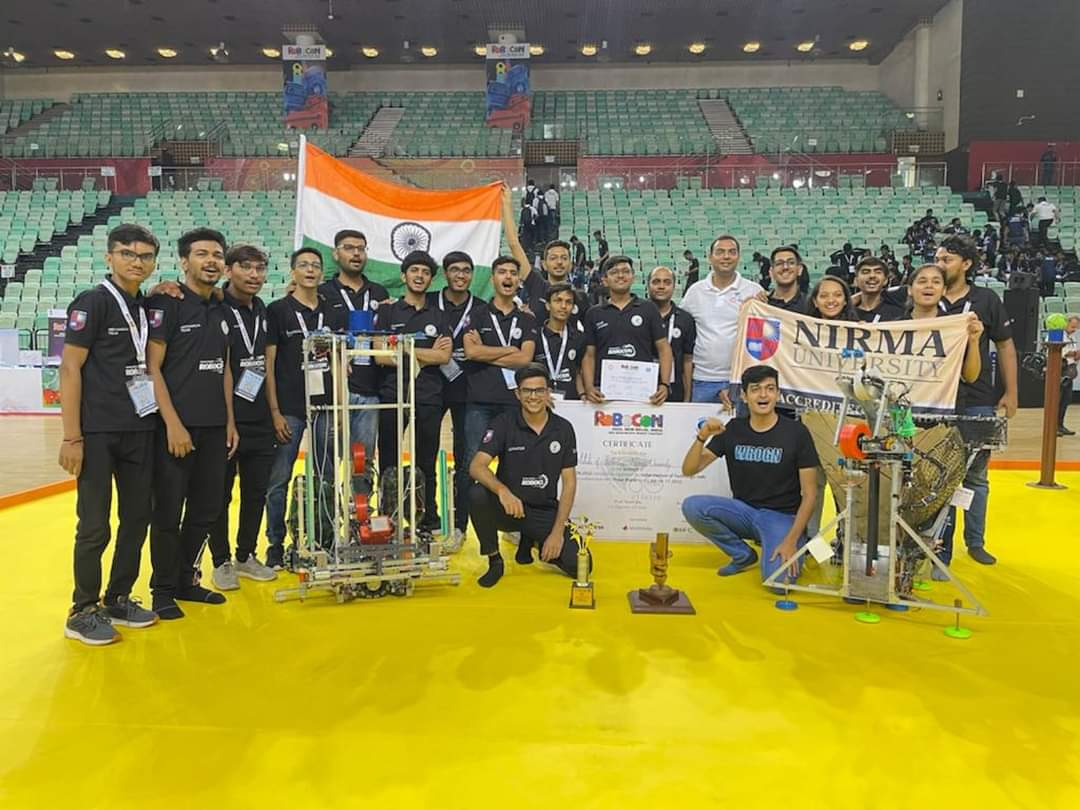
Nirma University, the 2022 winner of Robocon India

Quarter Finals (National ROBOCON 2022)
| Team Code | Institute Name | Short Name |
|---|---|---|
| QF1 | MIT World Peace University, Pune | MTT |
| QF2 | Government College of Engineering and Research Avasari Khurd, Pune | ABHEDYA |
| QF3 | Pimpri Chinchwad College of Engineering | Automatons |
| QF4 | Institute of Technology, Nirma University | Nirma Robocon |
| QF5 | Parul Institute of Technology, Parul University | TEAM PU ROBOCON |
| QF6 | K. J. Somaiya College of Engineering | KJSCE Robocon |
| QF7 | Pune Institute of Computer Technology | PICT Robotics |
| QF8 | BRACT's Vishwakarma Institute of Technology, Pune | VIT PUNE |

Quarter-finals
MTT | Q1
VIT PUNE | Q8
NIRMA | Q4
PU | Q5
ABHEDYA | Q2
KJSCE | Q7
AUTOMATONS | Q3
PICT | Q6

Semi-finals
MTT | SF1
NIRMA | SF4
AUTOMATONS | SF2
ABHEDYA | SF3

Final
NIRMA | F1
ABHEDYA | F2

=== Awards ===
DD-ROBOCON 2022 awards:

- Winner: Institute of Technology, Nirma University, Ahmedabad - as team INDIA A (Captain: Arya Kargathara)
- Host Country Second Winner (1st runner-up): Government College of Engineering and Research, Avasari Khurd - as team INDIA B (Captain: Sushant Phalke)
- 2nd runner-up: Pimpri Chinchwad College of Engineering, Pune

fusion Design awards:

- fusion Design Award: KJSCE Robocon (K. J. Somaiya College of Engineering)
- fusion Impact Award: PU Robocon (Parul University)

Special awards:

- Visvesvaraya Award for the Best Design: GTU Robotics Club from Gujarat Technical University.
- PARAM Award for the Best Software: BRACT's Vishwakarma Institute of Technology.
- Ashoka Award for the Best Aesthetics: Team Rudra from Marathwada Mitra Mandal's College of Engineering.

Other awards:

- Best Report Award: Padmabhooshan Vasantdada Patil Institute of Technology, Bavdhan, Pune.
- IHSC Award: MIT World Peace University, Pune.
- Best software fusion Design: National Institute of Technology, Durgapur.
- Abdul Kalam Award for the Best New Team: Panchjanya from Birla Vishvakarma Mahavidyalaya.

=== Robocon India 2021 ===
With the 20th anniversary of the ABU Robocon, the theme challenges teams to play the ancient game by using the robots equipped with the modern technology. The game will be between two teams having two robots each.

- Winner: Nirma University (ITNU)
- Host Country Second Winner: Government College of Engineering and Research, Avasari (ABHEDYA)

=== Robocon India 2020 ===
- Winner: MIT Tech Team (MTT) from MIT World Peace University, Pune

=== Robocon India 2019 ===
The National ABU Robocon 2019 was held in the Lecture Hall Complex of IIT Delhi. Final match was played between L. D. Engineering College, Ahmedabad and Institute of Technology, Nirma University, Ahmedabad on 16 June 2019. L. D. Engineering College, Ahmedabad won the National level Robocon 2019 contest. Nirma University was first runners up and Gujarat Technological University was second runners up. The ABU Robocon 2019 was held at Ulaanbaatar, Mongolia. The theme was "Sharing the knowledge". It is related to the Urtuu system of Mongolian tradition. The winning team would represent India at Mongolia for International Robocon contest.

The host of Robocon India 2019 was IIT Delhi.

==== Format ====
The format of Robocon India 2019 was changed. It was consisted of three stages, however, teams opposed this format. This new format was not allowing all teams to took part in Robocon 2019, only the qualifying teams after stage 1 and 2 were allowed to took part.

In the first stage, the evolution is based on the report and CAD Model submitted. The maximum points for a team was 100, allocated as follows:

- Solution ideas (20 points)
- Design detail Document (40 points)
- CAD modeling (40 points).

Total 86 teams participated in the first stage and 54 teams were qualified for the second stage.

In the second stage, evolution is based on the video of actual robots performing different task as per rule-book of ABU Robocon 2019. The total points was 100 and was allocated as follows:

- Shagai placing and throwing (20 points)
- Gerege passing mechanism (20 points)
- Movement of manual robot (20 points)
- Movement of autonomous robot (40 points)

26 teams were qualified for the third stage. It was the actual competition held at Lecture Hall Complex of IIT Delhi on 16 June 2019. Eight teams were finalized for the quarterfinals based on their points in league matches.

Quarter Finals (National ROBOCON 2019)
| Team Code | Institute Name | Short Name |
|---|---|---|
| QF1 | Institute of Technology, Nirma University, Ahmedabad | ITNU |
| QF2 | Indian Institute of Technology Roorkee | IITR |
| QF3 | L.D. College of Engineering, Ahmedabad | LDCE |
| QF4 | Gujarat Technological University, Ahmedabad | GTU |
| QF5 | KJ Somaiya College of Engineering, Mumbai | KJSCE |
| QF6 | Vadodara Institute of Engineering, Vadodara | VIER |
| QF7 | Government College of Engineering and Research, Avasari (Pune) | GCOEARA |
| QF8 | Government College of Engineering, Aurangabad | GECA |

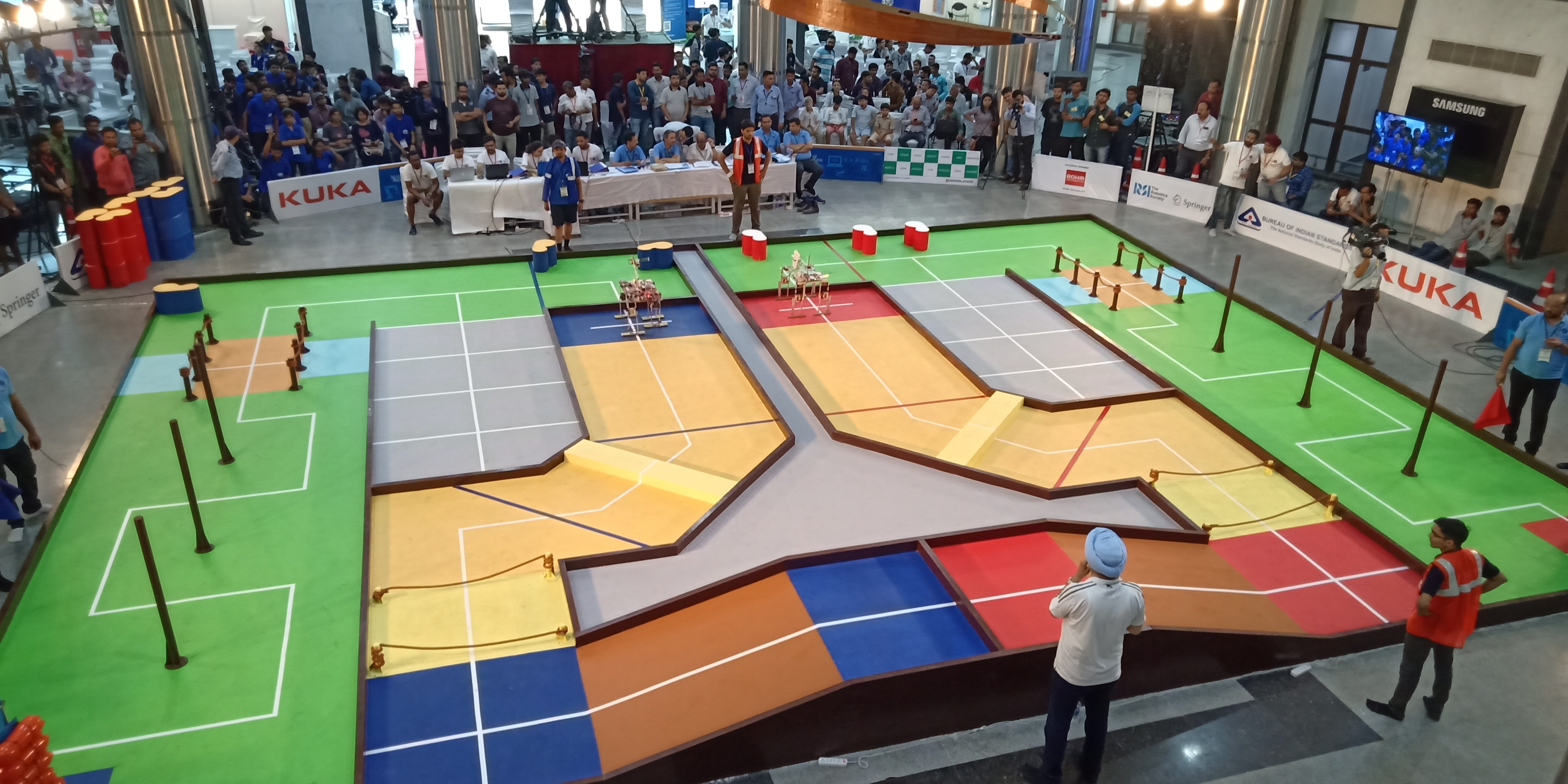
Robocon 2019 Quarter Finals

Quarter-finals
ITNU | QF1
GECA | QF8
GTU | QF4
KJSCE | QF5
LDCE | QF3
VIER | QF6
IITR | QF2
GCOEARA | QF7

Semi-finals
ITNU | SF1
GTU | SF4
LDCE | SF2
GCOEARA | SF3

Final
ITNU | F1
LDCE | F2

==== Awards ====
- Judges Special Award 1: IIT Roorkee
- Judges Special Award 2: Government College of Engineering and Research, Avasari
- Best Report Award: Sardar Patel College of Engineering, Mumbai
- Springer 100 Euro Book Coupon Award: All the Quarter Finalists
- MathWorks Modelling Award:
  - 1st winner: Government College of Engineering, Aurangabad
  - 2nd winner: Pimpri Chinchwad College of Engineering, Pune
  - 3rd winner: College of Engineering, Pune
- DD-ROBOCON 2019 Awards:
  - Winner: L. D. College of Engineering, Ahmedabad (Captain: Shashish Nav)
  - 1st runner-up: Institute of Technology, Nirma University, Ahmedabad (Captain: Paras Savnani)
  - 2nd runner-up: Gujarat Technological University (GTU), Team A
  - Prof. Balakrishna Memorial Award (for the Winner): L. D. College of Engineering, Ahmedabad

=== Robocon India 2018 ===
The National ABU Robocon 2018 was held in the Badminton Hall of the Shree Shiv Chhatrapati Sports Complex, Balewadi, Pune on the 1–3 March 2018. The theme for Robocon 2018 was announced by Vietnam as ném còn (throwing shuttlecock). The goal of the game is to throw the shuttlecocks through the ring at height. In Vietnamese culture, the game is about celebration and making friendship.

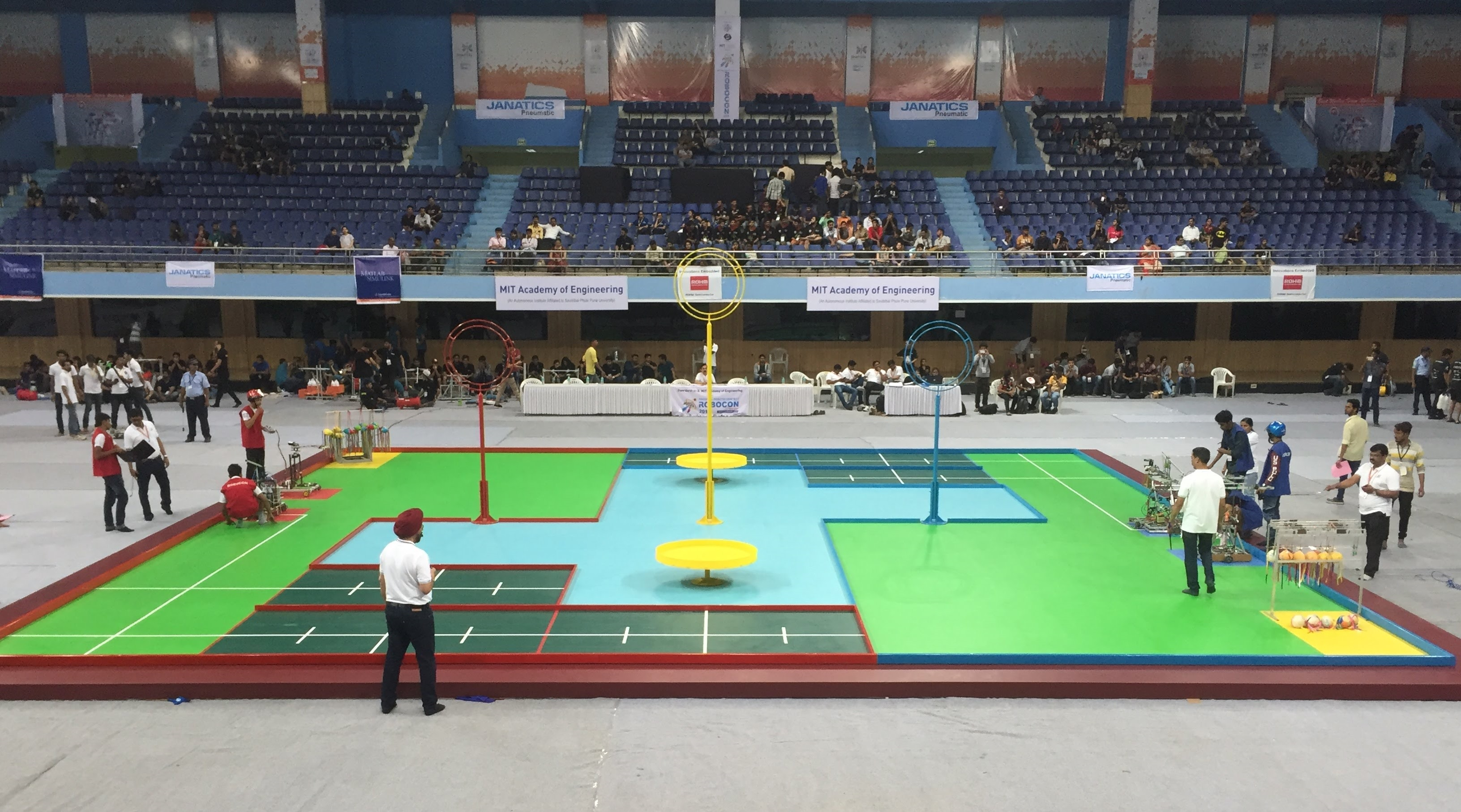
Robocon India 2018

Institute of Technology, Nirma University, Ahmedabad won the Robocon India 2018. MIT Tech Team from Maharashtra Institute of Technology, Pune, was the first runner-up and K. J. Somaiya Institute of Engineering and Information Technology, Mumbai, was the second runner up. The team from L.D. Engineering College, Ahmedabad won the best idea award. IIT Roorkee won the best innovative design award. Neotech Institute of Technology, Vadodara won the Rookie award. Nirma University also received the award for the fastest job-completing robot, finishing the entire game in just 44 seconds.

Institute of Technology, Nirma University, Ahmedabad (Team India Captain: Paras Savnani) went on to represent India at ABU Robocon 2018, held at Ninh Binh, Vietnam, on 24–27 August 2018, where the team received the ROHM Award for their innovative design.

=== Robocon India 2017 ===
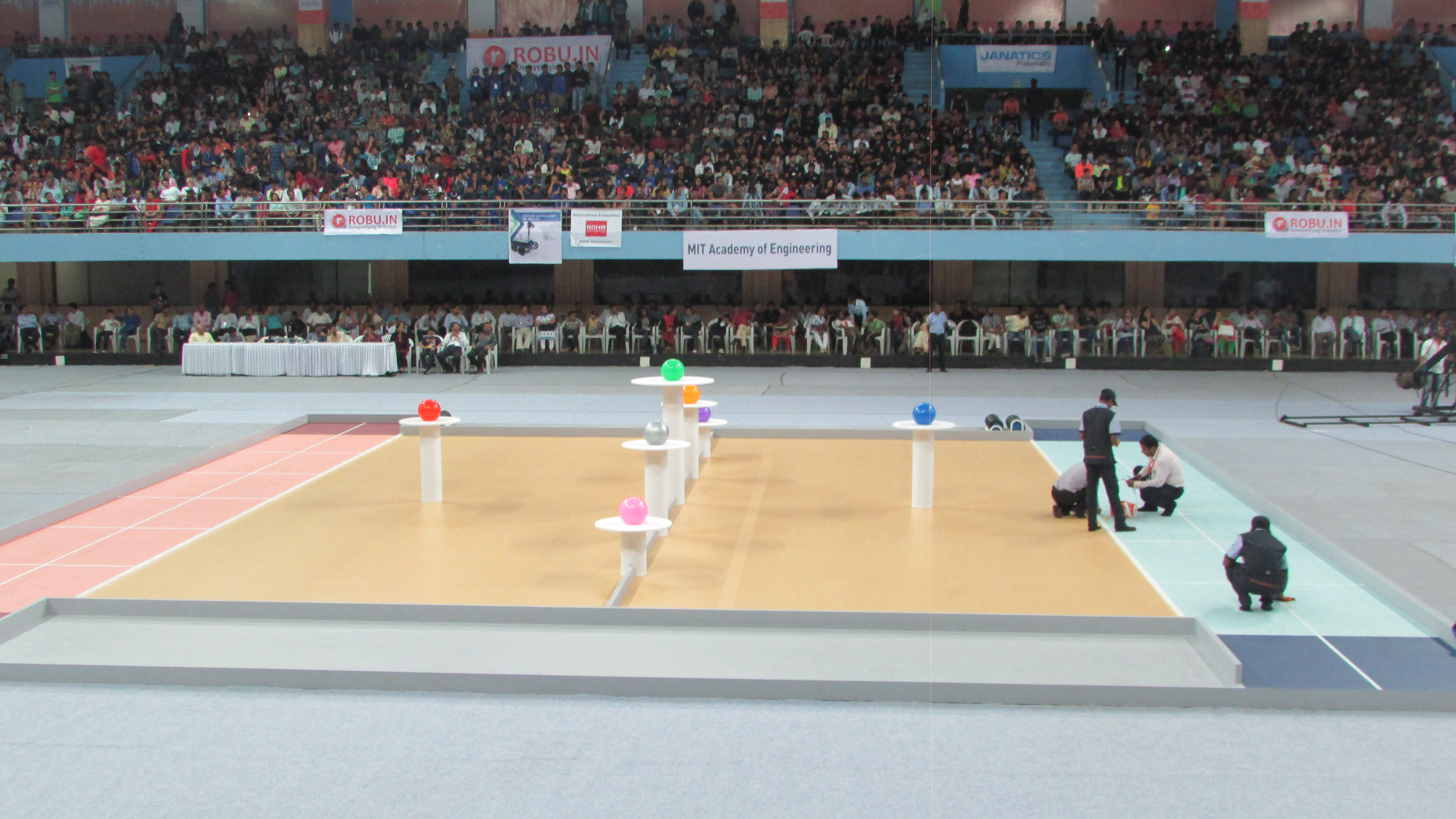
Robocon India 2017

The Robocon India 2017 took place in the Shri Shiv Chhatrapati Krida Sankul, Pune on 2–4 March 2017. The contest theme has been declared as "Asobi: The Landing Disc”. College of Engineering, Pune won the competition. Maharashtra Institute of Technology, Pune, was the first runner-up.

=== Robocon India 2016 ===
The National ABU Robocon 2016 took place in the Shri Shiv Chhatrapati Krida Sankul, Pune on 3–5 March 2016. The theme for Robocon 2016 has been declared as Chai-Yo: Clean Energy Recharging the World. Vadodara Institute of Engineering, Vadodara won the National ABU Robocon 2016 Contest. College of Engineering, Pune, was the first runner-up.

=== Robocon India 2015 ===
The National ABU Robocon 2015 took place in the Badminton Hall of the Shree Shiv Chhatrapati Sports Complex, Balewadi, Pune on 7 March 2015. The theme for Robocon 2015 has been declared by Televisi Republik Indonesia (TVRI) as Robomintion: Badminton Robo-Game. Institute of Technology, Nirma University, Ahmedabad won the National ABU Robocon 2015 Contest and were the first runners-up. Muffakham Jah College of Engineering and Technology (MJCET) stood third in the contest and was also awarded the Best Design and Aesthetics robot at the Asia Pacific Broadcasting Union Robotics Contest (ABU Robocon) 2015 held at Maharashtra Institute of Technology, Pune. U.V.Patel College of Engineering, Mehsana, Gujarat won the Best Idea Award. Additionally, Team Rudra from Marathwada Mitra Mandal's College of Engineering, just in its first year of competition won the "Best Rookie Award".

=== Robocon India 2014 ===
The National ABU Robocon 2014 was held in the Badminton Hall of the Shree Shiv Chhatrapati Sports Complex, Balewadi, Pune from 6 March to 8 March 2014. The theme for Robocon 2014 declared by MITAOE was A Salute to Parenthood. Institute of Technology, Nirma University, Ahmedabad won the National Contest while Veermata Jijabai Technological Institute (VJTI), Mumbai were the First Runner-up. Both these Institutes got the chance to represent India in the international contest. MIT Robocon Tech Team representing Maharashtra Institute of Technology, Pune was the second runner-up.

The International ABU Robocon 2014 was held in India. Lạc Hồng University, Vietnam won the International ABU Robocon 2014 held at Balewadi, Pune.

=== Robocon India 2013 ===
The National ABU Robocon 2013 was held in the Badminton Hall of the Shree Shiv Chhatrapati Sports Complex, Balewadi, Pune. MIT Tech Team from Maharashtra Institute of Technology won the contest and represented India in the international contest.

The International ABU Robocon 2013 was held in Danang, Vietnam. The Theme for Robocon 2013 declared by VTV was The Green Planet. The International ABU Robocon 2013 was won by Kanazawa Institute of Technology, Japan.

=== Robocon India 2012 ===
The National ABU Robocon 2012 was held in the Boxing Arena of The Shree Shiv Chhatrapati Sports Complex, Balewadi, Pune. MIT Tech Team from Maharashtra Institute of Technology won the contest and represented India in the international contest and L. D. College of Engineering won the best innovative design award.

The theme for ABU Robocon 2012 was declared by Hong Kong as Peng On Dai Gat. It was won by University of Electronic Science and Technology of China.

=== Robocon India 2011 ===
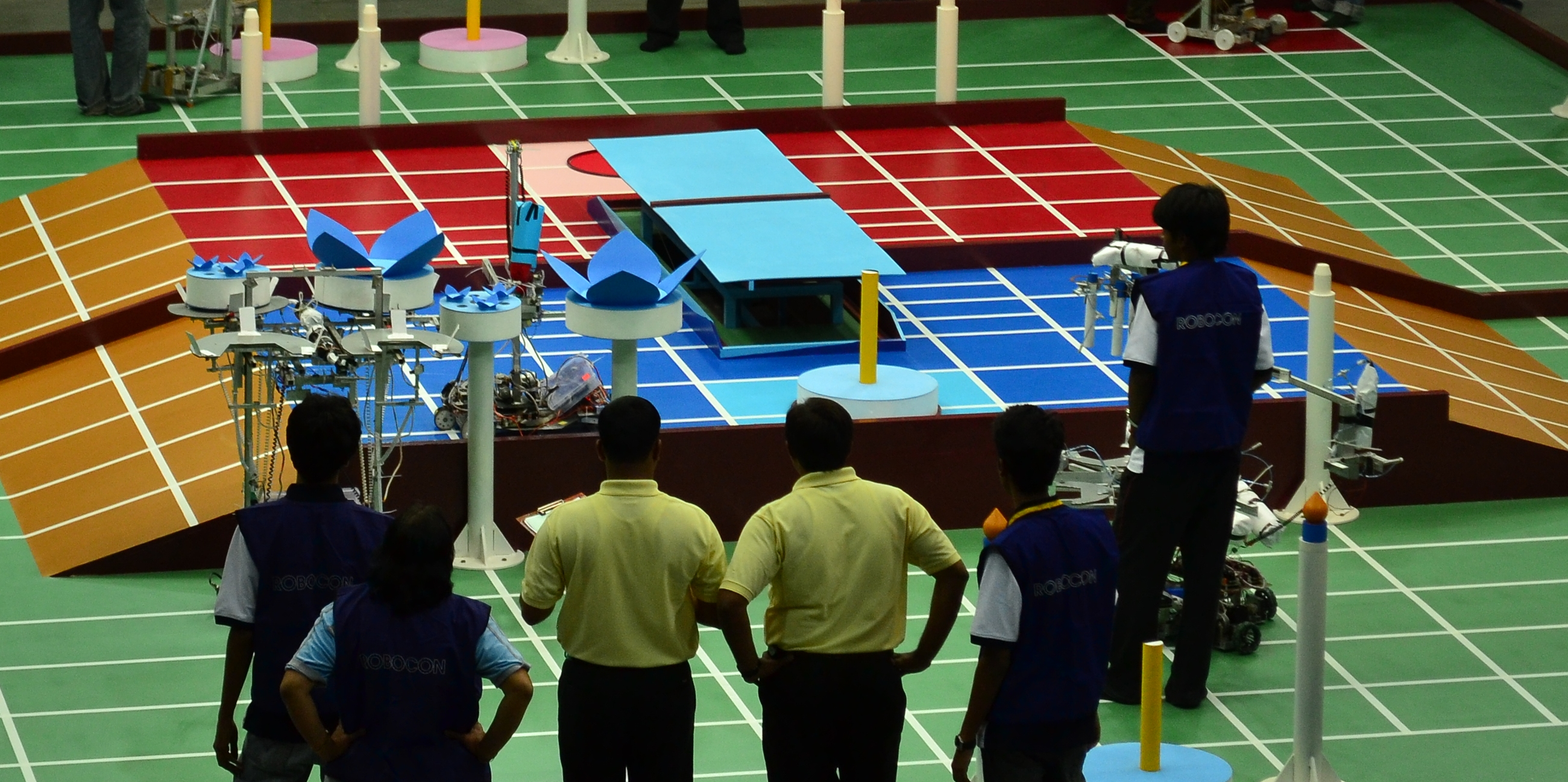
Robocon India 2011

The Theme for Robocon 2011 declared by Thailand was Krathong, Lighting Happiness with Friendship. It was won by Institute of Technology, Nirma University and this institute got a chance to represent India at International Robocon 2011. The winner of ABU Robocon 2011 was Dhurakij Pundit University from Thailand.

=== Robocon India 2010 ===
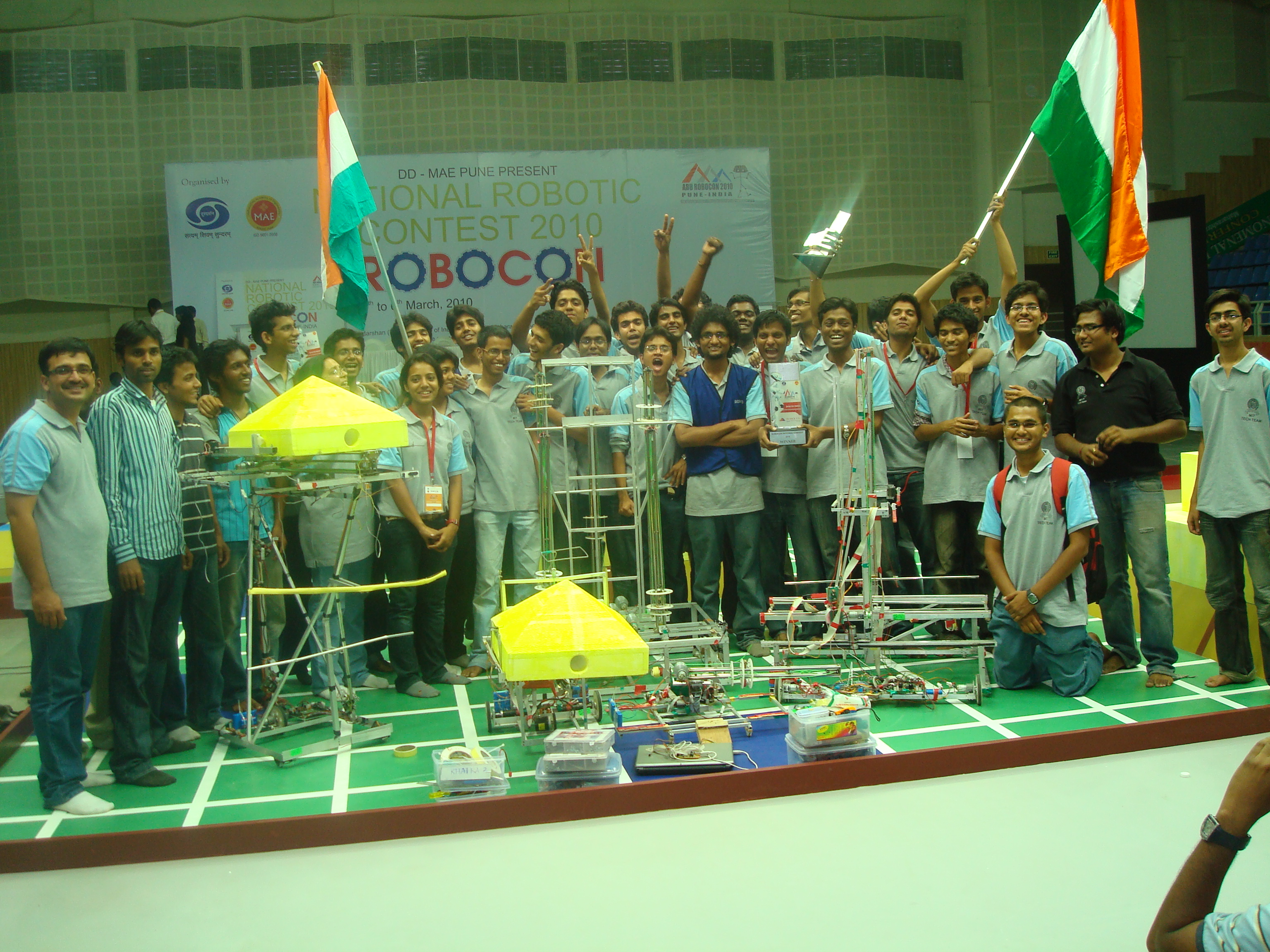
Robocon 2010 Winner: MIT, Pune

The theme for Robocon 2010 declared by Egypt was Robo-Pharaohs Build Pyramids.

It was won by MIT Robocon Tech Team from MIT Pune.

=== Robocon India 2009 ===
The official theme was Kago, the traditional Japanese palanquin, carried by human beings replaced by robots. It was won by IIT Madras.

=== Robocon India 2008 ===
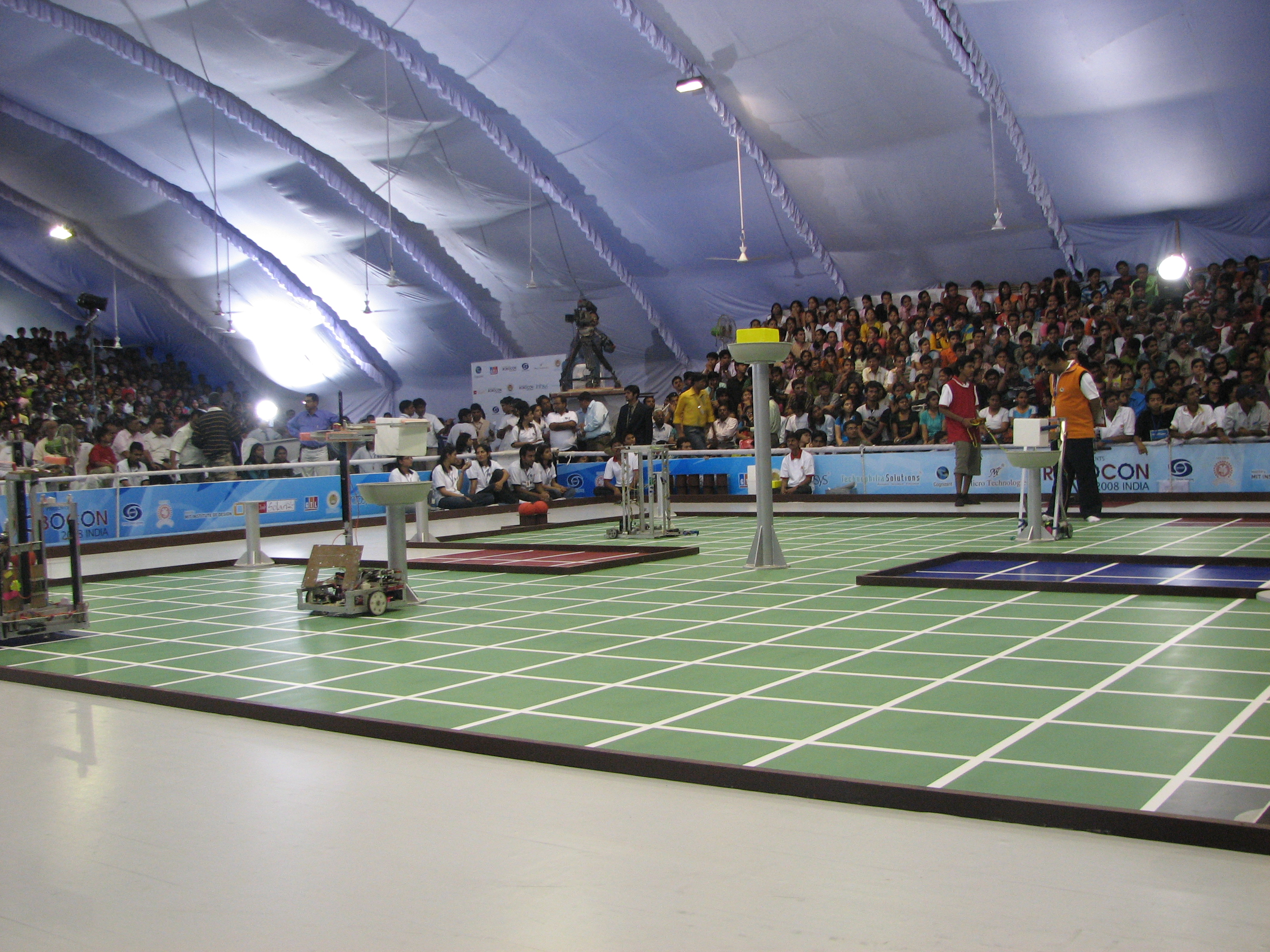
Robocon India 2008

The theme for Robocon 2008 declared by India was Govinda, a traditional Indian Deity who used to play earthly games by capturing butter/cheese from heads of Gopis. It was won by Institute of Technology, Nirma University, Ahmedabad. Runner-up was MIT Robocon Tech Team from MIT Pune. Both teams represented India at ABU Robocon as the host country was allowed to send two teams.

=== Robocon India 2007 ===
It was won by IIT Delhi.

=== Robocon India 2005 ===
Total 14 teams participated in the contest held on 24–25 June 2005 at MIT, Pune. The theme was Climb The Great Wall And Light The Holy Fire.

It was won by IIT Bombay.

=== Robocon India 2004 ===
Total 12 teams participated in the contest held on 26–27 June 2004 at Institute of Technology, Nirma University, Ahmedabad. The theme was Reunion of Separated Lovers, Gyeonu and Jingnyeo.

It was won by VESIT, Mumbai, while L. D. College of Engineering, Ahmedabad was runner-up.

==== Awards ====
- Most Aesthetically Built Robot: Vivekanand Education Society's Institute Of Technology, Mumbai
- Most Functional Robot: L. D. college of Engineering, Ahmedabad
- Most Innovative Design: Institute of Technology, Nirma University, Ahmedabad
- Consolation Prize for Simplest Design: U. V. Patel College of Engineering, Mehsana

=== Robocon India 2003 ===
Total seven teams from five different universities participated in the contest held on 13–14 July 2003 at Nirma Institute, Ahmedabad. The theme was Takraw Space Conqueror.

It was won by Institute of Technology, Nirma University, Ahmedabad.

=== Robocon India 2002 ===
Four teams from three different universities participated in the contest held at IIT Kanpur on July 20–21, 2002. The theme was Reach for the top of Mt. Fuji and the participating teams were VESIT, Mumbai; IIT Kanpur and Institute of Technology, Nirma University, Ahmedabad.

It was won by Institute of Technology, Nirma University, Ahmedabad.

== Results ==
| Year | Host city | Host Broadcaster | Theme | Grand Prix | National Winner | Indian Contest Co Organised by |
|---|---|---|---|---|---|---|
| 2002 | Tokyo, Japan | NHK | Reach for the Top of Mount Fuji | (Vietnam) Ho Chi Minh City University of Technology | (India) Institute of Technology, Nirma University | IIT Kanpur |
| 2003 | Bangkok, Thailand | MCOT | Takraw Space Conqueror | (Thailand) Sawangdandin Industrial and Community Education College | (India) Institute of Technology, Nirma University | Nirma University, Ahmedabad |
| 2004 | Seoul, South Korea | KBS | Reunion of Separated Lovers, Gyeonu & Jingnyeo | (Vietnam) Ho Chi Minh City University of Technology | (India) VESIT, Mumbai | Nirma University, Ahmedabad |
| 2005 | Beijing, China | CCTV | Climb on the Great Wall Light the Holy Fire | (Japan) University of Tokyo | (India) IIT Bombay | MIT, Kothrud Pune |
| 2006 | Kuala Lumpur, Malaysia | RTM | Building the World's Tallest Twin Tower | (Vietnam) Ho Chi Minh City University of Technology | (India) Institute of Technology, Nirma University | MIT, Kothrud Pune |
| 2007 | Hanoi, Vietnam | VTV | Halong Bay Discovery | (China) Xi'an Jiaotong University | (India) IIT, Delhi | MIT, Kothrud Pune |
| 2008 | Pune, India | Doordarshan | Govinda | (China) Xi'an Jiaotong University | (India) Institute of Technology, Nirma University | MIT, Kothrud Pune |
| 2009 | Tokyo, Japan | NHK | Travel Together for the Victory Drums | (China) Harbin Institute of Technology | (India) IIT Madras | MITSOT, Pune & MITAOE |
| 2010 | Cairo, Egypt | ERTU | Robo-Pharaohs built pyramids | University of Electronic Science and Technology of China | (India) MIT Robocon Tech Team | MITAOE |
| 2011 | Bangkok, Thailand | MCOT | Loy Krathong, Lightning Happiness with friendship | (Thailand) Dhurakij Pundit University | (India) Institute of Technology, Nirma University | MITAOE |
| 2012 | Hong Kong | RTHK | Peng On Dai Gat (In pursuit of peace and prosperity) | University of Electronic Science and Technology of China | (India) MIT Robocon Tech Team | MITAOE |
| 2013 | Đà Nẵng, Vietnam | VTV | The Green Planet | (Japan) Kanazawa Institute of Technology | (India) MIT Robocon Tech Team | MITAOE |
| 2014 | Pune, India | Doordarshan | A Salute for Parenthood | (Vietnam) Lac Hong University | (India) Institute of Technology, Nirma University | MITAOE |
| 2015 | Yogyakarta, Indonesia | Indonesia | Badminton | (Vietnam) Hung Yen University of Technology and Education | (India) Institute of Technology, Nirma University | MITAOE |
| 2016 | Bangkok, Thailand | Modernine TV/MCO | Clean Energy Recharging the World | Universiti Teknologi Malaysia | (India) Vadodara Institute of Engineering, Kotambi Vadodara | MITAOE |
| 2017 | Tokyo, Japan | NHK | The Landing Disc | (Vietnam) Lac Hong University | (India) College of Engineering, Pune | MITAOE |
| 2018 | Ninh Bình, Vietnam | VTV | The Flying Dragon | (Vietnam) Lac Hong University | (India) Institute of Technology, Nirma University | MITAOE |
| 2019 | Ulaanbaatar, Mongolia | Mongolian National Broadcaster | Great Urtuu | The Chinese University of Hong Kong | (India) L. D. College of Engineering Ahmedabad | IIT Delhi |
| 2020 | Suva, Fiji | | ROBO RUGBY 7s | | MIT Pune | IIT Dehli |

== Gallery ==
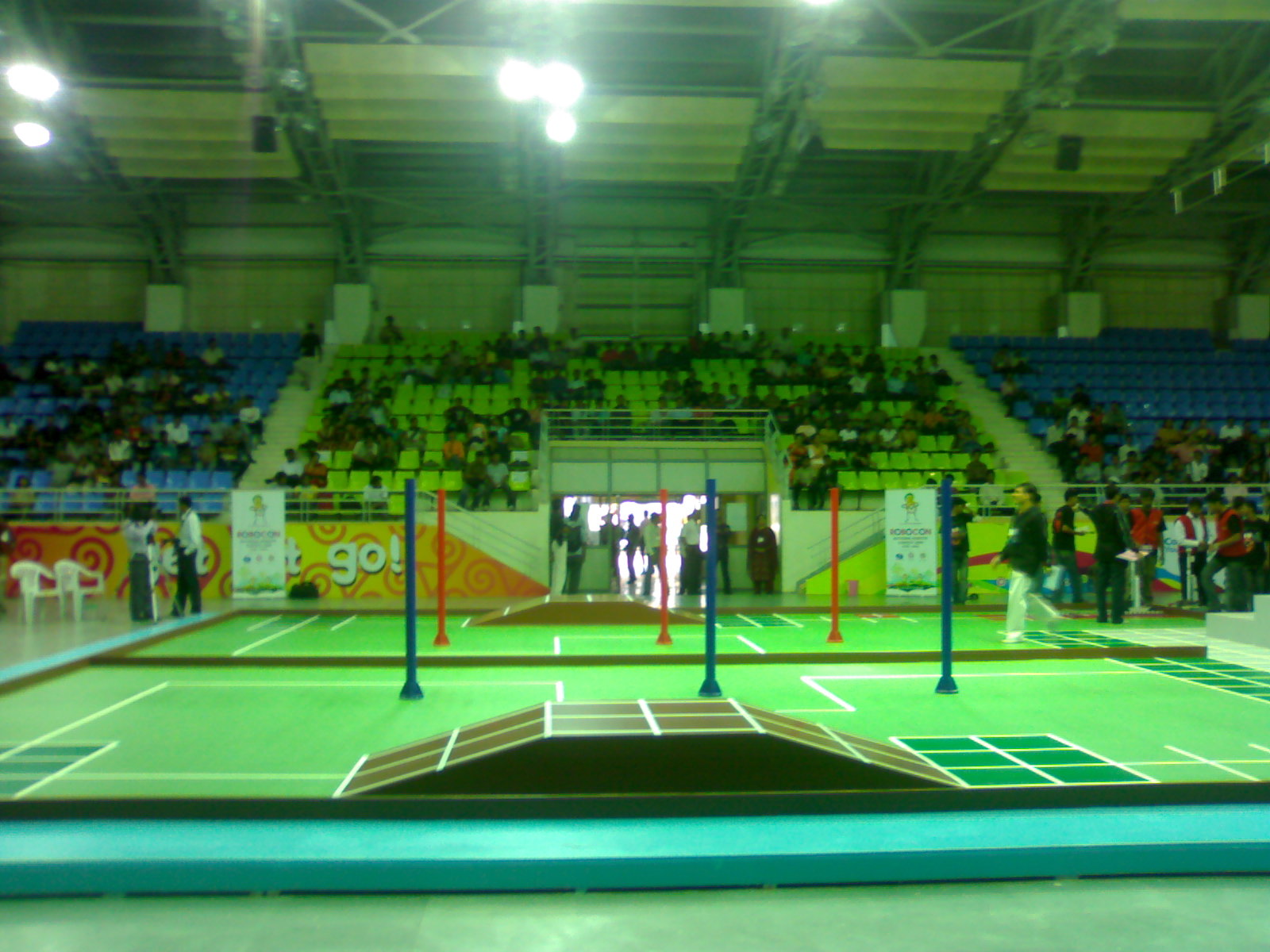
View of competition venue during Robocon India 2009

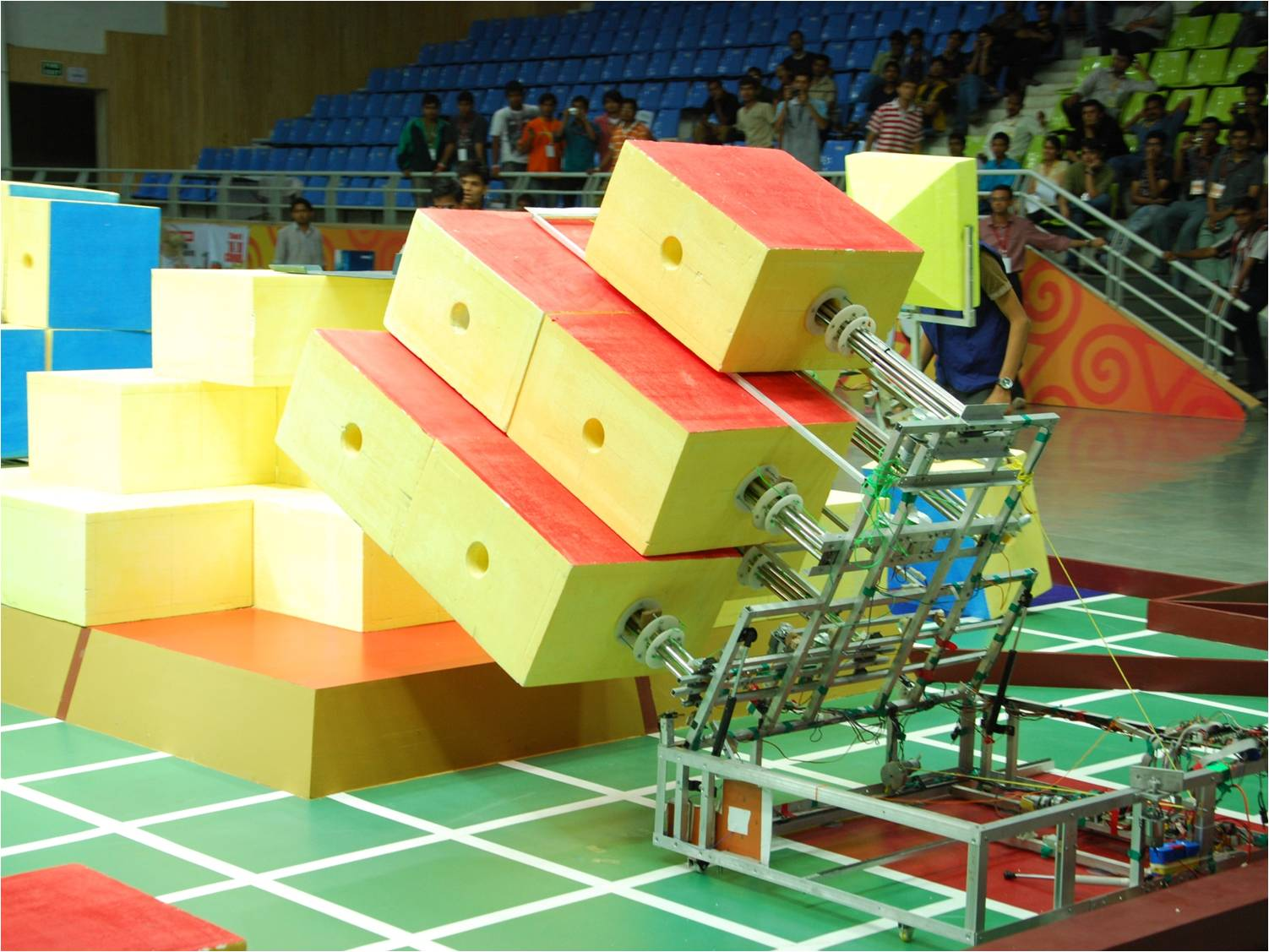
Robocon India 2010

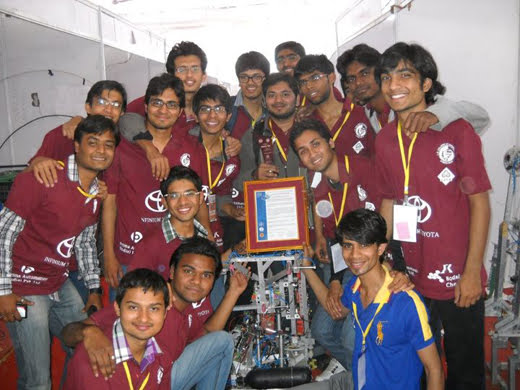
Best Innovative Design Award for Team Robocon LDCE in 2012

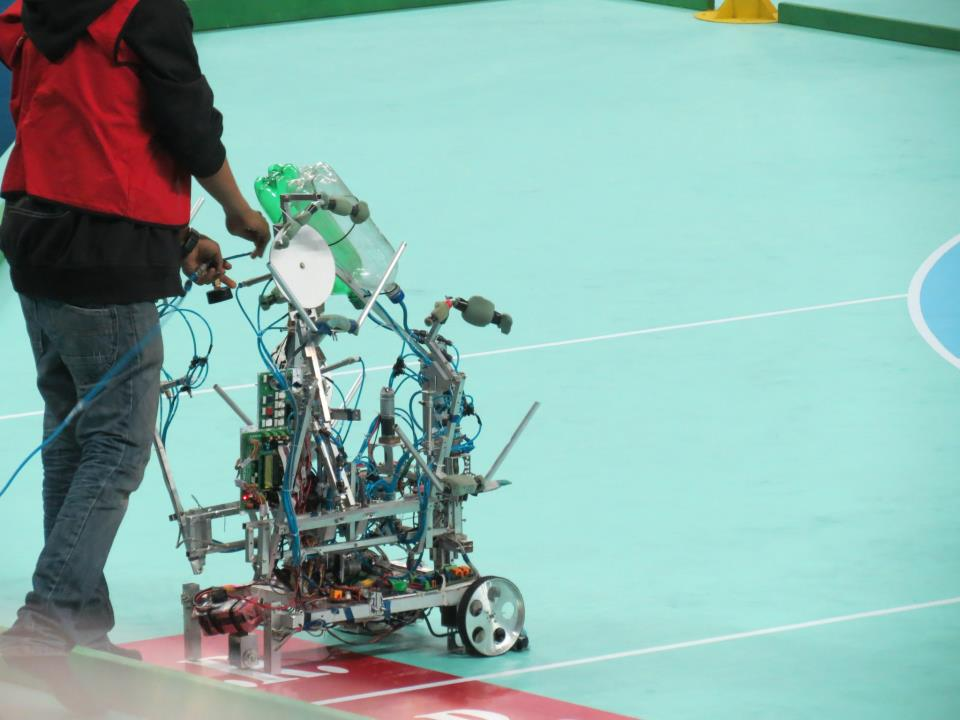
Robocon India 2013

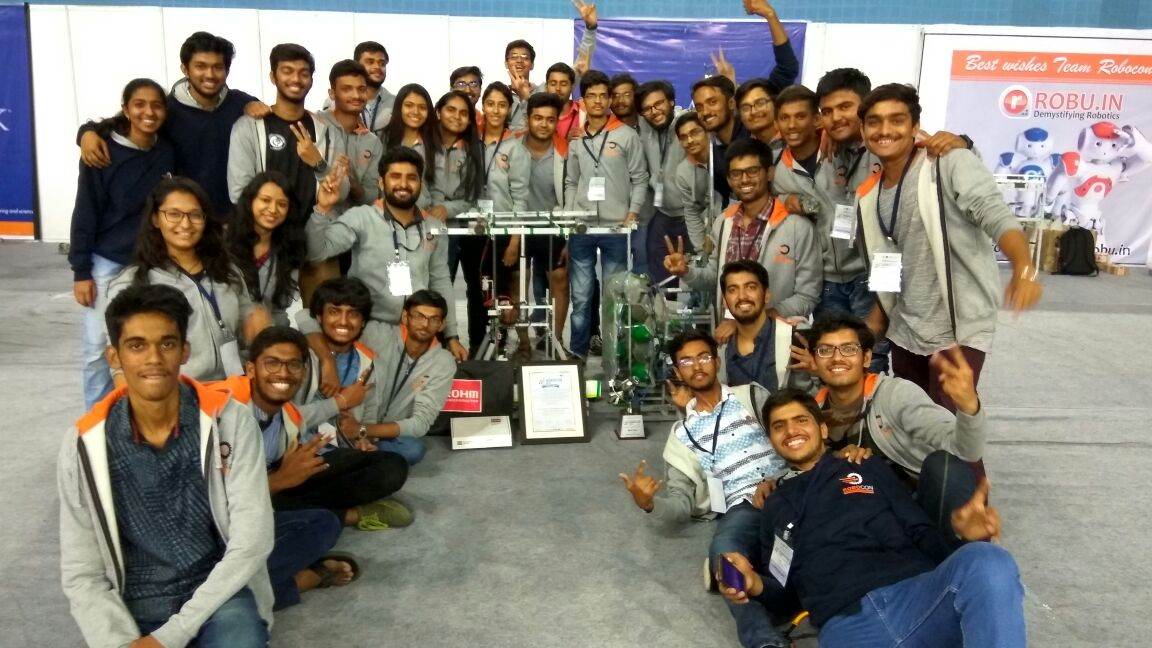
Best Idea Award 2018 for Team Robocon LDCE

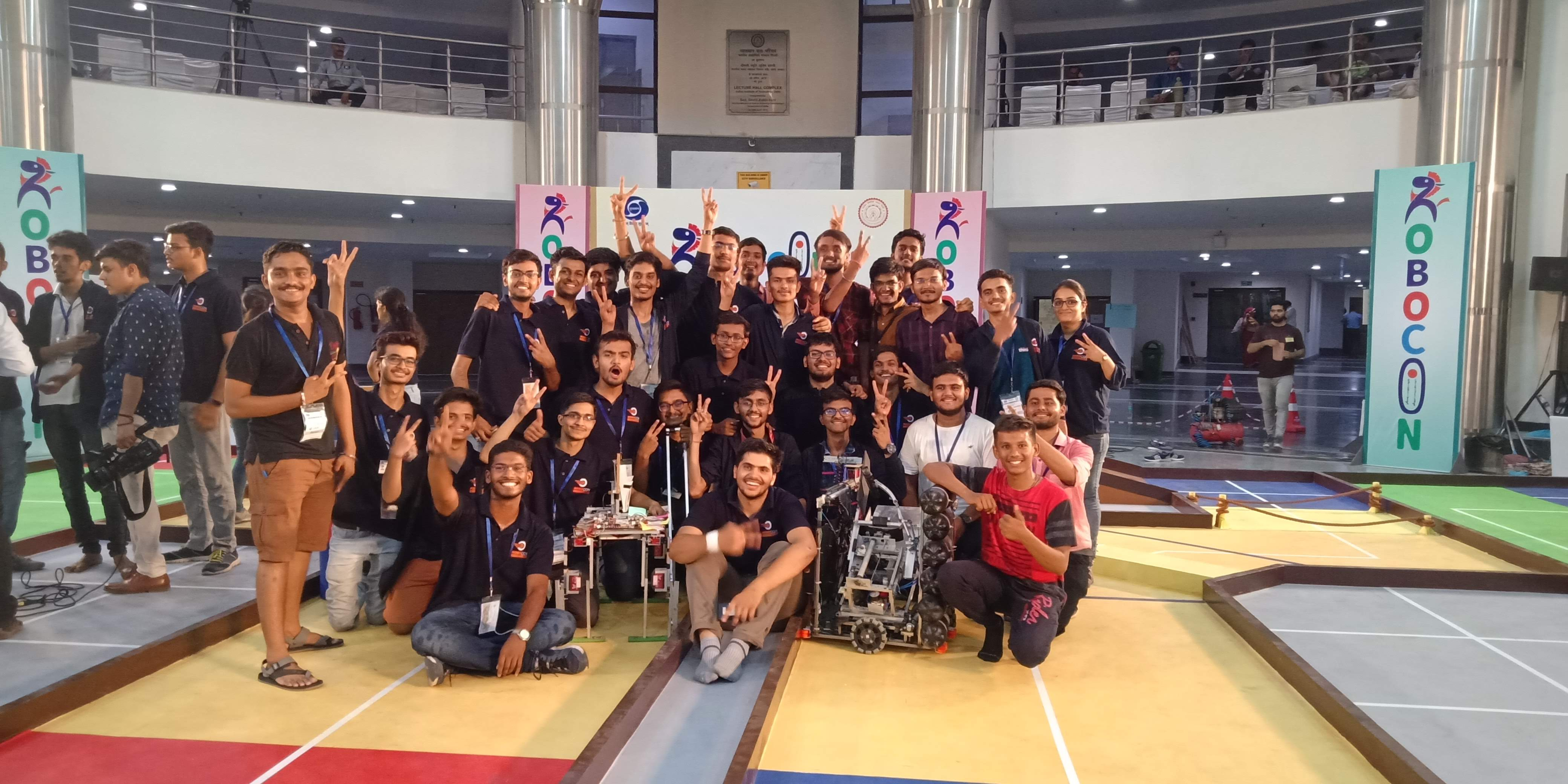
India in ABU Robocon 2019
