= MIT Robocon Tech Team =

MIT Tech Team (Robocon)
- Former name: MIT Robocon Team
- Motto in English: We Don’t just build Robots, we build people who build robots.
- Type: College club
- Established: 2007
- Accreditation: Official Robotics Club of MITWPU
- President: Jayesh Sangave
- Faculty Advisor: Prof. Dr. Saket Yeolekar
- Students: 30
- Location: Mahaveer Building, near basketball court, MITWPU campus, Pune, India
- Website: https://robocon.in/

MIT Tech Team (Robocon), Pune, India is one of Robocon India teams and the official robotics club of MIT-WPU. It is a team of students from different fields of the MIT WPU Faculty of Engineering and Technology, known for its consistent performance in the Indian National Robocon.

== History ==
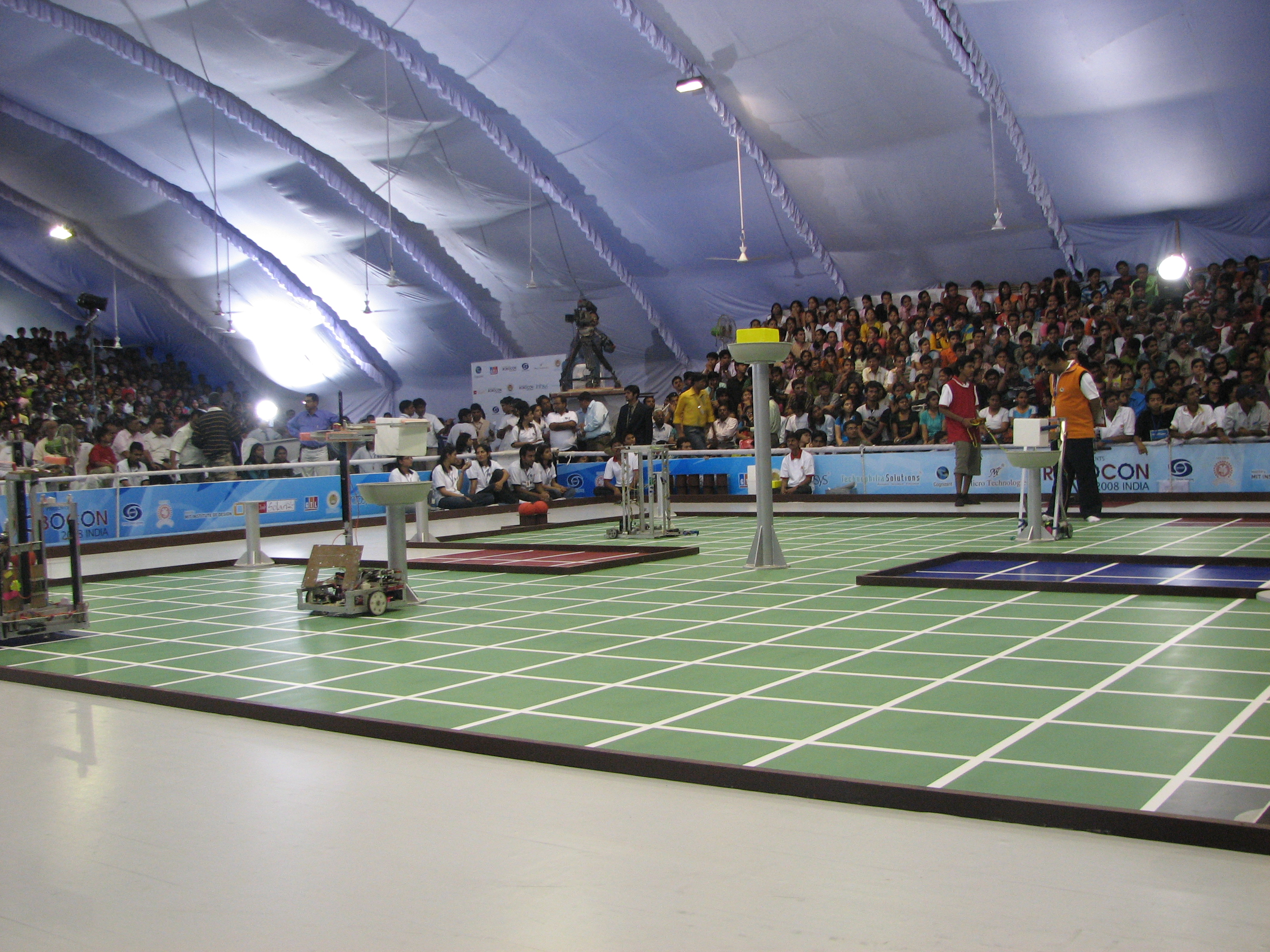
MIT Tech team at Robocon India 2008

It was founded in 2007 by MIT-Pune, now MIT-WPU. The team was established under the guidance of Prof. Ms. S.H. Kulkarni, Prof. Dr. Saket Yeolekar, and Prof. Dr. Vishwanath Karad, who also played a crucial role in mentoring the team. It started its legacy in 2008 when MIT hosted the Asia-Pacific Broadcasting Union (ABU) Robocon competition and became the Indian National Winner. The Robotics Innovation Lab is one of the initiatives taken by the institute to help students get hands-on experience in the field of robotics. The team competes annually in several competitions, the most prominent of which is ABU Robocon.

== Achievements ==
Year	Theme	Achievements
2024	‘Harvest Day' (Vietnam)	Second runner-up in Indian National Robocon
2023	'Casting Flowers over Angkor Wat' (Cambodia)	First runner-up in Indian National Robocon
2022	'Lagori' (India)	IHSC Award and Helping Hand Award at Indian National Robocon (IIT Delhi)
2020	'Robo Rugby 7s' (India)	Winner of Indian National Robocon; Represented India at International ABU Robocon; Prof. Balakrishna Memorial Award
2018	'Ném Còn' (Vietnam)	Finalist and first runner-up in Indian National Robocon (Pune)
2017	'Asobi, the Landing Disc'	First runner-up at Indian National Robocon (Pune) | Represented India at International ABU Robocon; Best aesthetic award 2nd runner-up in Mathworks Modelling awards
2016	'Chai-Yo, Clean Energy Recharging the World'	National Rank 4 in Indian National Robocon (Pune); Best Idea award Fastest Pole climbing robot
2014	'A Salute to Parenthood' (India)	Second Runner-up in Indian National Robocon (Pune)
2013	'The Green Planet' (Vietnam)	Winner of Indian National Robocon (Pune); Represented India at International ABU Robocon; Highest aggregate score in ABU Robocon (Vietnam); Prof. Balakrishna Memorial Award
2012	'Peng On Dai Gat' (Hong Kong)	Winner of Indian National Robocon (Pune); Represented India at International ABU Robocon; Award for securing 5th rank at international ABU Robocon; Fastest job completion robot Prof. Balakrishna Memorial Award
2011	'Krathong: Lighting Happiness with Friendship' (Thailand)	Indian Semi-finalist (Pune)
2010	'Robo-Pharaohs Build Pyramids' (Egypt)	Winner of Indian National Robocon; Represented India at International ABU Robocon; Best Innovation award Prof. Balakrishna Memorial award
2008	'Govinda' (India)	Runner-up in Indian National Robocon (India); Represented India at International ABU Robocon; Misumi Sponsors Award

== Departments ==
MIT Tech Team has the following departments:

- Dynamics: It includes designing, manufacturing, fabrication, and the mechanical structure of the bot, along with using SolidWorks.
- Circuits: It involves building electronic circuits, working with microcontrollers and their peripherals, developing firmware, designing power systems, embedded systems, MCUs, and custom boards, along with programming in C and C++.
- Controls:It includes ROS2 (Robot Operating System) for the control and simulation of robots, Computer vision for object and color detection, Gazebo, a 3D robot simulation environment used for testing and validating robotic algorithms and systems, and programming languages such as Python and C++.
- Non-Tech (Management): Event management, marketing, sponsorship, finance, web development, graphic designing, video editing, and content writing.
