= Pimpri Chinchwad College of Engineering =

Engineering college in Pune, India

Pimpri Chinchwad College of Engineering, Pune
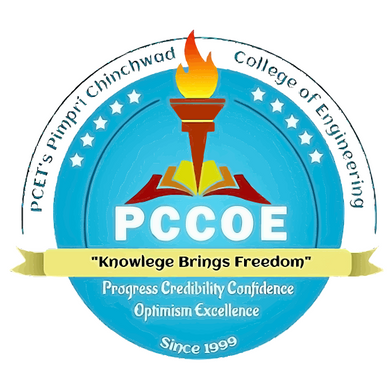
- Motto: Value Added Quality Education
- Type: Private Autonomous Engineering College (Permanent Un-Aided) Co-ed
- Established: 1999
- Director: Sankalp Pakalwar
- Administrative staff: 350
- Students: 4,000
- Location: Pune, Maharashtra, India; 18°39′7″N 73°45′43″E
- Campus: Urban, 13 acres (5.3 ha)
- Website: www.pccoepune.com

Pimpri Chinchwad College of Engineering (PCCOE) is an autonomous engineering college in the city of Pune, India, established in 1999.

The Pimpri Chinchwad College of Engineering is affiliated with Savitribai Phule Pune University (SPPU), formerly the University of Pune. The university houses 46 academic departments. It has about 307 recognised research institutes and 612 affiliated colleges offering graduate and undergraduate courses.

== Courses Offered ==
=== Academic Programs and Departments ===
==== Undergraduate Programs ====
PCCoE offers a variety of undergraduate programs in the field of engineering. The available departments and their programs are:

- Mechanical Engineering
- Electronics and Telecommunication Engineering
- Computer Engineering
- Information Technology
- Civil Engineering

==== Detailed Undergraduate Programs ====
Choice Code	Course Name	Start Year	Intake
617519110	Civil Engineering	2012	60
617524510	Computer Engineering	2001	240
617524610	Information Technology	2001	160
617537210	Electronics and Telecommunication Engineering	2001	180
617561210	Mechanical Engineering	1999	180
617524590L	Computer Engineering (Regional Language)	2021	60
617591110	Computer Science and Engineering (Artificial Intelligence and Machine Learning)	2021	120

==== Postgraduate Programs ====
In addition to undergraduate programs, PCCoE provides advanced postgraduate courses for students who wish to further their education. These include:

P.G. Engineering Programs Offered By PCCoE (DTE Code : 6175)

Sr. No.	Name of Program	Choice Code	Intake
1	Mechanical Engineering - Design	617590410	18
2	Mechanical Engineering - Computational Mechanics	617559610	18
3	Electronics and Telecommunication Engineering - VLSI and Embedded Systems	617534110	18
4	Computer Engineering	617524510	18
5	Artificial Intelligence & Data Science	617524610	18
6	Construction Management (Civil Engineering)	617521010	18

== Achievements ==
=== Accolades and Accreditations ===
- National Board of Accreditation (NBA) Accreditation (received four times for Mechanical Engineering, Computer Engineering, E&TC Engineering and received thrice for IT Engineering and Received for Civil Engineering)
- NAAC Accredited with ‘A’ Grade (3.20 score)
- Recognition under the 2(f) and 12 (B) UGC scheme
- Ph.D. Research Centre in (Mechanical Engineering, Computer Engineering and Electronics & Telecommunication Engineering)
- ISO 9001:2015 Re-Certification by TUV NORD since 2017
- ISO 9001:2008 Certified by TUV NORD since 2014 for Three Years

=== Rankings and Awards ===
- Silicon India Education Rankings 2024: PCCOE ranked 22nd in India among the Top 100 Engineering Colleges, 5th in West India among the Top 10 Engineering Colleges, and 7th in Engineering Colleges with the Latest Labs Facilities.
- The WEEK Best College Survey 2024: PCCOE ranked 67th in India among Private Engineering Colleges, 12th in West Zone among Private Engineering Colleges, and 10th in Maharashtra among Private Engineering Colleges.
- Times All India Engineering Institutes Ranking Survey 2024: PCCOE ranked 15th in the Top 175 Engineering Institute Ranking and 3rd in the Top 20 Private Engineering Institute Rankings 2024 in the West Region.
- Outlook ICARE Ranking 2024: PCCOE Ranked 41st in Top 100 Private Engineering Colleges.
- DataQuest Top T Schools 2024 PCCoE Ranked 60th among the top engineering colleges in INDIA
- Times Engineering Survey 2023 : PCCoE ranked 16th in INDIA among Top 175 Engineering Institutes in Times Engineering Survey 2022
- India Today Engineering Survey 2023 : PCCoE ranked 108th in INDIA among top 200 Private Engineering Colleges in India Today Engineering Survey 2022
- Outlook Best College Rankings 2023 : PCCoE Ranked 44th in INDIA among top 100 Private Engineering Colleges
- The WEEK Best College Survey 2023 : PCCoE Ranked 71st among private engineering colleges in INDIA.
- DataQuest Top T Schools 2023: PCCoE Ranked 60th among the top engineering colleges in INDIA
- DataQuest Top 100 T-Schools based on Employability Index 2023: PCCoE Ranked 8th in INDIA and 2nd in Wes Region.
- NIRF 2022: PCCoE Ranked in Top 251–300 Engineering Colleges across the Country by NIRF Ranking
- Times Engineering Survey 2022 : PCCoE ranked 18th in INDIA among Top 175 Engineering Institutes in Times Engineering Survey 2022
- India Today Engineering Survey 2022 : PCCoE ranked 113th in INDIA among top 200 Private Engineering Colleges in India Today Engineering Survey 2022
- Outlook-iCARE Best College Rankings 2022 : PCCoE Ranked 45th in INDIA among top 100 Private Engineering Colleges
- The WEEK Best College Survey 2022 : PCCoE Ranked 69th among private engineering colleges in INDIA.
- NIRF 2021: PCCoE Ranked in Top 251–300 Engineering Colleges across the Country by NIRF Ranking
- Times Engineering Survey 2021 : PCCoE ranked 20th in INDIA among Top 175 Engineering Institutes in Times Engineering Survey 2021
- India Today Engineering Survey 2021 : PCCoE ranked 76th in INDIA among top 200 Private Engineering Colleges in India Today Engineering Survey 2021
- Outlook-iCARE Best College Rankings 2021 : PCCoE Ranked 47th in INDIA among top 100 Private Engineering Colleges
- The WEEK – Hansa Research Best College Survey 2021 : PCCoE Ranked 61st among private and 88th among all engineering colleges in INDIA.
- ISTE National Award Best Private Engineering College to PCCoE: PCCoE received the “VVR Seshadri Rao Gudlavelluru Engg College National award for Best Private Engineering College 2020”
- NIRF 2020: PCCoE Ranked at 197 position among Engineering Colleges in India in NIRF-2020
- Times Engineering Survey 2020 : PCCoE ranked 21st in INDIA among Top 100 Private Engineering Institutes in Times Engineering Survey 2020
- Outlook-Toluna Engineering Rankings 2020: PCCoE Ranked 51st in INDIA among top 110 Private Engineering Colleges
- India Today Engineering Survey 2020 : PCCoE ranked 80th in INDIA among top 200 Private Engineering Colleges in India Today Engineering Survey 2020
- The WEEK – Hansa Research Best College Survey 2020 : PCCoE Ranked 14th in west zone, 67th among private and 97th among all engineering colleges in INDIA.
- NIRF 2019: PCCoE Ranked at 192 position among Engineering Colleges in India in NIRF-2019
- DataQuest Top T Schools 2019: PCCoE Ranked 7th in West Zone Top 10 T Schools, 20th among Private T Schools in INDIA, 34th in Top Government + Private T Schools in INDIA. Among only 4 Engineering Colleges Ranked from Pune and Among Only 3 Engineering Colleges affiliated to SPPU, Pune
- Times Engineering Survey 2019 : PCCoE ranked 25th in INDIA among Top 100 Private Engineering Institutes in Times Engineering Survey 2019
- India Today Engineering Survey 2019 : PCCoE ranked 69th in INDIA among top 200 Private Engineering Colleges in India Today Engineering Survey 2019
- Outlook Drishti Engineering Survey 2019 : PCCoE ranked 69th in INDIA among top 200 Private Engineering Colleges in Outlook Drishti Engineering Survey 2019
- Swachhta Ranking Awards 2019 : PCCoE Ranked 3rd in INDIA in category 'Non-Residential College- AICTE'
- NIRF 2018: PCCoE Ranked among top 151-200 Engineering Colleges in India in NIRF-2018
- Times Engineering Survey 2018: PCCoE Ranked 30th in INDIA Among Private Engineering Colleges and Overall 45th in India in i3RC-Times Engineering Survey 2018 (All India Rank 30th among Private Engineering Colleges )
- India Today Magazine Engineering College Rankings-2018: PCCoE Ranked 45th in INDIA in India Today Magazine Engineering College Rankings-2018
- Outlook Top 100 Engineering Colleges-2018: PCCoE Ranked 41th in INDIA Among Private Engineering Colleges and Overall 61th in Outlook Top 100 Engineering Colleges-2018
- DataQuest Survey 2018 : PCCoE ranked 23rd in India in Top 100 T-Schools. Third in West Zone. Fifth in Industry Interface in India
- NIRF 2017: PCCoE Ranked in Top 150 – 200 Engineering Colleges across the Country by NIRF Ranking, Ministry of HRD's 2016 – 17.
- TIMES Engineering Institute Ranking Survey 2017: PCCoE Ranked at 52nd Position among Top 100 Engineering Colleges in India and also ranked at 31st Position among Top 50 Private Engineering Institutes in India
- Data Quest Engineering Colleges Survey 2017: PCCoE 55th All India Rank, 12th position in All India Ranking for B Schools, 1st position in Industry Institute Interface, 4th position overall in West Zone base on Placements
- Honored with Engineering Education Excellence Award 2015 by Indo Global Chamber of Commerce Industries and Agriculture.
- Honored with 'College of Substance" award by Natarajan education Society

== Technical Events ==
To provide a platform for budding engineers to showcase their technical abilities and knowledge PCCOE organizes intercollegiate events "TECHLLIGENT" and "SPECTRUM". SPECTRUM is a unique event in SPPU for First-Year Engineering Students. TECHLLIGENT consists of events and competitions related to models, projects, papers, demonstrations, and coding. Students of PCCOE have active participation in international level competitions like "ROBOCON", 'SAE BAJA', 'Supra', 'ESVC3000', ACM ICPC, and Smart India Hackathon (SIH). An event called "ZEST" is organized by the Department of MBA.

== See also ==
- List of educational institutions in Pune
