= Higher Technological Institute =

Private technological institute in Egypt

Coordinates: 30.3062°N 31.7562°E

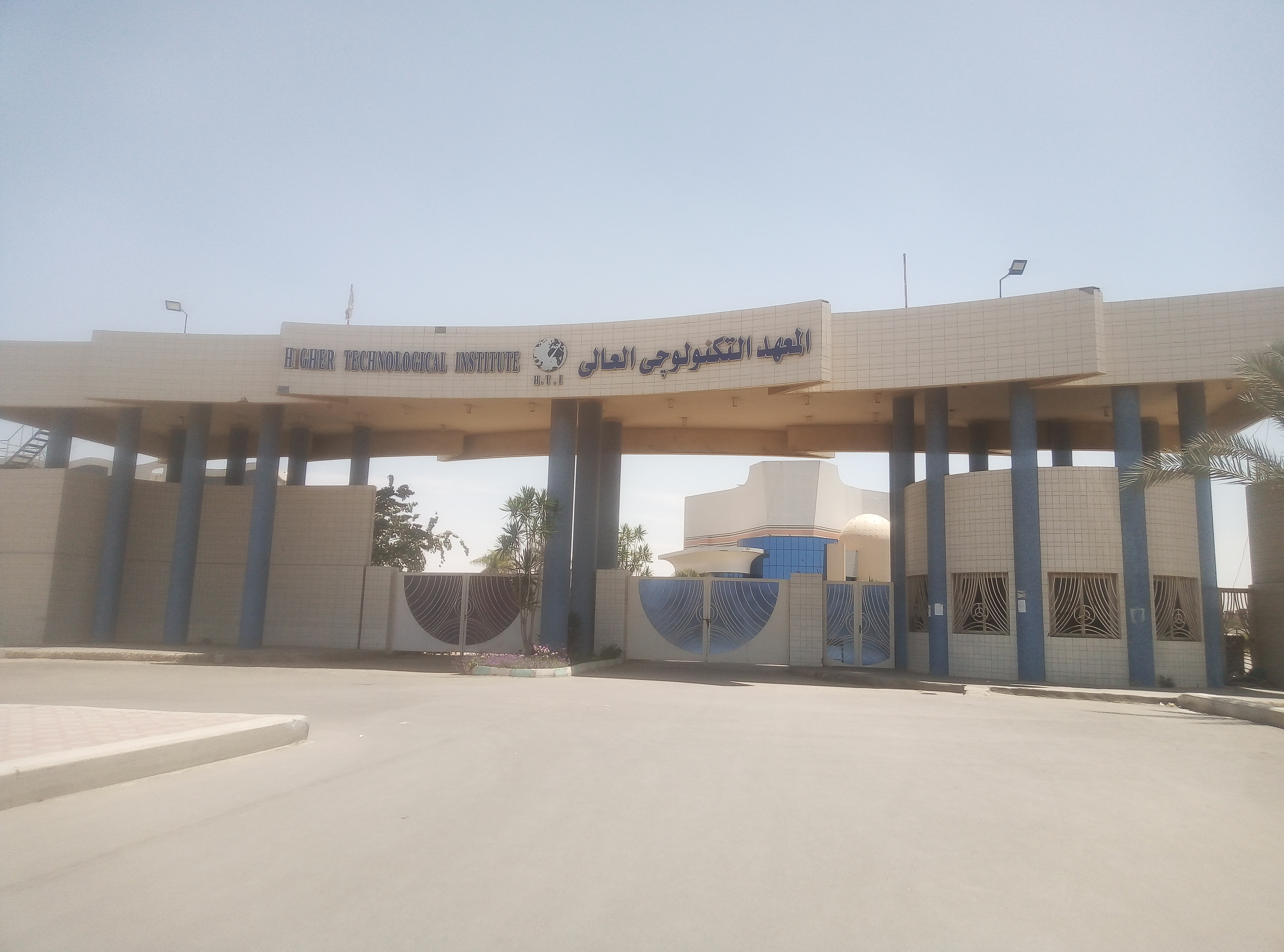
- Type: Private
- Established: 1988
- President: Prof. Mustafa Kamel
- Location: 10th of Ramadan, Egypt
- Campus: 10th of Ramadan City
- Nickname: HTI
- Website: www.hti.edu.eg

Higher Technological Institute is the first private technological institute in Egypt. It is a co-educational, land-grant, space-grant, research university located in 10th of Ramadan City. It is considered one of the top engineering institutions in the Middle East and the flagship campus of the Higher Technological Institute System which comprises four main campuses within the city – the Higher Technological Institute at Tenth of Ramadan City, the Higher Technological Institute at 6 October City, the Higher Technological Institute at Mersa Matrouh, and the Higher Technological Institute at Al Minya. More than 20,000 students are enrolled in many undergraduate, graduate, and professional programs. It is classified as a research university with very high research activity in environmental development. Founded by Prof. Mustafa Kamel, its present name was adopted in 1987 and classes were first held on September 21, 1988. It is noted for its strong engineering majors (particularly mechanical engineering and architecture), business, computer sciences, communication disorders, creative writing, and history programs. It was founded by Prof. Mustafa Kamel on 27 October 1988, according to the law of non-profit national higher institutions No. 52 of 1970. The first academic year started on 21 September 1988. Total enrollment for the fall semester of 2014 was 21,976. The university campus comprises exactly 220 acres (89 ha), including Old Main, the first permanent academic building erected. The ratio of students to faculty is 40:1.

The official announcement of Higher Technological Institute as the first educational organization in Egypt joins LABVIEW Academy was on 7 March 2015 under supervision of Prof. Dr. Yehia Hendawy.

Higher Technological Institute has four branches: 10th of Ramadan City (Main Campus), 6th of October City Campus, Mersa Matruh Campus, and Al Minya Campus.

== Departments ==
=== Engineering Department ===
Higher Technological Institute offers two engineering degrees; diploma and bachelor's degrees; both degrees require a 44 units preparatory program to be passed before graduation. However; it is recommended to finish most of it before declaring a major as most of its courses are prerequisites for major courses.

- Architectural Engineering: 209 units program leading to bachelor's degree or 129.5 for a diploma.
- Biomedical Engineering: 205 units program leading to bachelor's degree or 124.5 for a diploma.
- Chemical Engineering: 209 units program leading to bachelor's degree or 124.5 for a diploma.
- Civil Engineering: 211 units program leading to bachelor's degree or 127.5 for a diploma.
- Electrical Engineering and Computers: 207 units program leading to bachelor's degree or 126.5 for a diploma.
- Mechanical Engineering - General: 207 units program leading to bachelor's degree or 126.5 for a diploma.
- Mechanical Engineering - Mechatronics: 207 units program leading to bachelor's degree or 126.5 for a diploma.
- Textile Engineering: 207 units program leading to bachelor's degree or 128.5 for a diploma.

=== Technological Management and Information (Arabic) ===
- Accounting
- Economics and Political Science
- Marketing
- Technology Management

=== Technological Management and Information (English) ===
- Accounting
- Economics and Political Science
- Marketing
- Technology Management
- Management and Information Systems

=== Computer science ===
- Computer science
- Computer networks
- Information system

== 6th of October City Campus ==
=== Departments and Disciplines ===
==== Engineering Department ====
- Architectural Engineering
- Civil Engineering
- Electrical Engineering
- Mechanical Engineering - General
- Mechanical Engineering - Automotives

== Mersa Matruh City Campus ==
=== Departments and Disciplines ===
==== Technological Management and Information (Arabic) ====
- Technology Management
