= 10th of Ramadan =

10th of Ramadan العاشر من رمضان
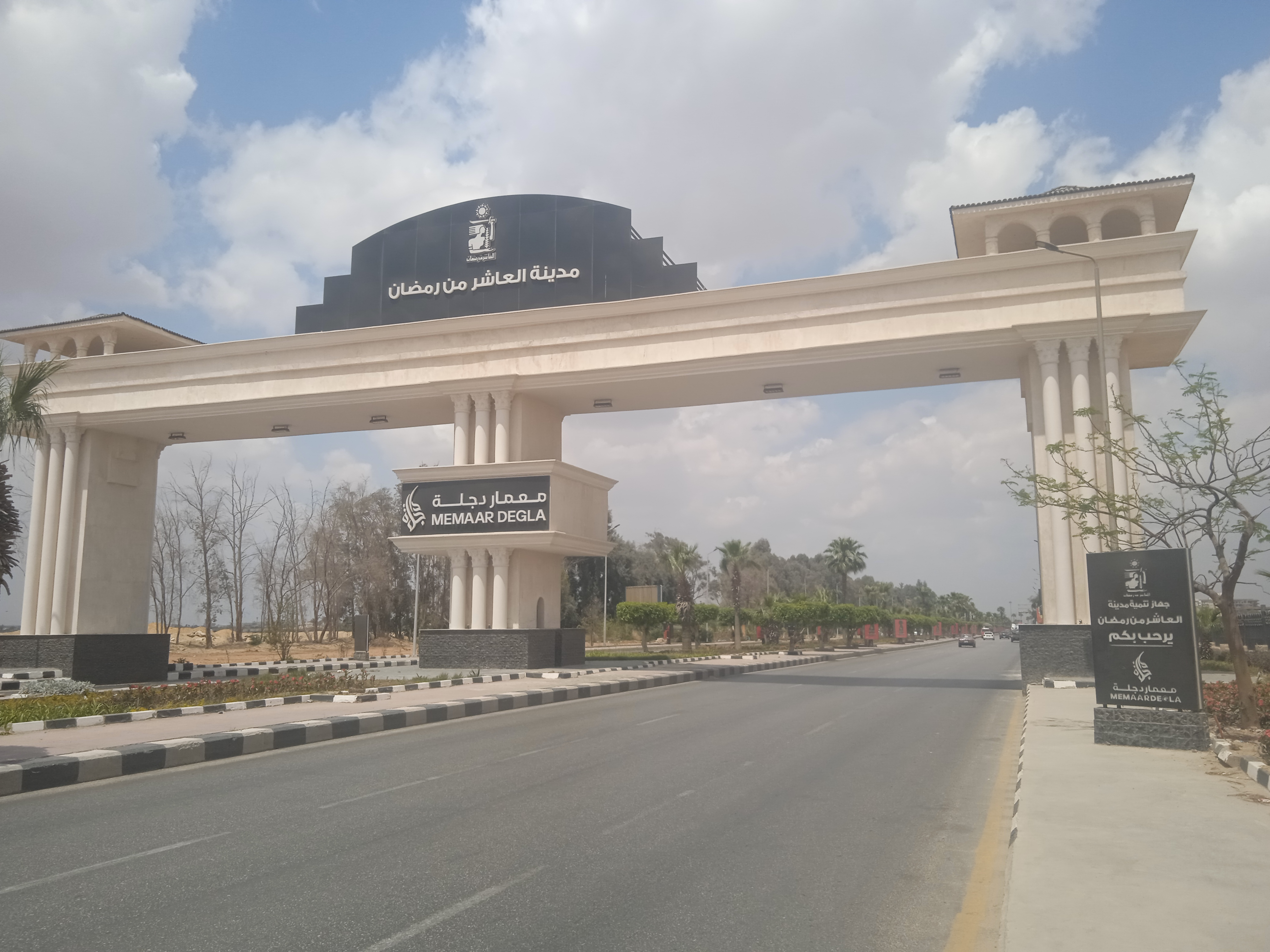

- Location within Egypt
- Coordinates: 30.306503°N 31.741455°E
- Country: Egypt
- Governorate: Sharqia
- Named for: Start of the October War

Area
  - Total: 66.08 km^{2} (25.51 sq mi)
- Elevation: 111 m (364 ft)

Population (2023)
  - Total: 263,321
  - Density: 3,985/km^{2} (10,320/sq mi)
- Time zone: UTC+2 (EET)
  - Summer (DST): UTC+3 (EEST)
- Area code: +20 (55)

10th of Ramadan (Arabic: العاشر من رمضان, romanized: Al-ʿĀshir min Ramaḍān) is an Egyptian city located in the southeast of Sharqia Governorate, on 95,000 acres of land. It is a first-generation new urban community, and one of the most industrialized. It is in close proximity to the city of Cairo, and is considered part of Greater Cairo. It is located on the Cairo-Ismailia desert highway. It was established by Presidential Decree No. 249 in 1977, in a bid to attract foreign and local capital with the intent of providing job opportunities for the country's youth, as well as to move people away from the Nile Valley to ease the stress on existing infrastructure and reduce congestion.

== History ==
The city was named for the commencement of the Ramadan War (the Yom Kippur War of 1973), which began on 10 Ramadan 1393 AH according to the Islamic calendar. It shares its name with the nearby 6th of October city. The city has beautiful landmarks including (but not limited to) the Tenth of Ramadan Mosque and the Ramadan City Public Park.

== Geography ==
10th of Ramadan is located on the Cairo–Ismailia desert highway, 46 km (29 mi) from Cairo and 20 km (12 mi) from the city of Bilbeis.

=== Climate ===
The Köppen climate classification system classifies its climate as hot desert (BWh), like the rest of Egypt.

Climate data for 10th of Ramadan
Month	Jan	Feb	Mar	Apr	May	Jun	Jul	Aug	Sep	Oct	Nov	Dec	Year
Mean daily maximum °C (°F)	18.5 (65.3)	19.9 (67.8)	23.6 (74.5)	27.9 (82.2)	32 (90)	34.5 (94.1)	34.9 (94.8)	34.7 (94.5)	32.1 (89.8)	30 (86)	25.2 (77.4)	20.6 (69.1)	27.8 (82.1)
Daily mean °C (°F)	13.1 (55.6)	14 (57)	17 (63)	20.4 (68.7)	24.2 (75.6)	27 (81)	28 (82)	28.1 (82.6)	25.7 (78.3)	23.6 (74.5)	19.7 (67.5)	15 (59)	21.3 (70.4)
Mean daily minimum °C (°F)	7.8 (46.0)	8.2 (46.8)	10.4 (50.7)	13 (55)	16.5 (61.7)	19.6 (67.3)	21.1 (70.0)	21.5 (70.7)	19.3 (66.7)	17.3 (63.1)	14.2 (57.6)	9.5 (49.1)	14.9 (58.7)
Average precipitation mm (inches)	7 (0.3)	4 (0.2)	3 (0.1)	2 (0.1)	0 (0)	0 (0)	0 (0)	0 (0)	0 (0)	2 (0.1)	4 (0.2)	4 (0.2)	26 (1.2)
Source: Climate-Data.org

== Economy ==
=== Agriculture ===
47 million Egyptian pounds have been invested in afforestation in the city.

=== Industry ===
Some of the industries present in the city include electronics, food processing, ready-made garments, plastic, paper, textiles, building materials, steel, pharmaceuticals and furniture. There are many industrial zones in the city with a total of 5083 factories.

==== Industrial zones ====
Name	Area (km^{2})
A1	10.46
A2	7.62
A3	4.06
A4	5.33
A5	9.47
A6	8.33
B1	5.24
B2	9.85
B3	0.31
B4	3.00
C1	0.75
C2	0.75
C3	0.11
C4	0.16
C5	1.23
C6	1.29
C7	0.33
C8	0.15
Total	72.32

=== Labor force ===
The population of the city is approximately 650,000 people. The factories provide 353,656 jobs, paying an annual total of roughly 18.3 million pounds.

== Infrastructure ==
The city's infrastructure includes a water supply, sewers, an electrical grid and telecommunications.

=== Water supply ===
The city has been connected to two water purification plants with a capacity of 621,000 m^{3}/day and station wells with a capacity of 20,000 m^{3}/day.

== Services ==
=== Health ===
10th of Ramadan includes many medical facilities, the most important of which are:

- 10th of Ramadan Central Hospital
- Health insurance hospital
- 10th of Ramadan Comprehensive Health Insurance Clinic
- Ibn Sina Hospital
- Eye Specialist Center

=== Education ===
The city includes many educational and research facilities, the most important of which are:

- Branch of the Higher Technological Institute
- Egyptian American Integrated School
- Egyptian Japanese School
- Tariq bin Ziyad Schools
- Future Experimental School
- Many Al-Azhar institutes

== See also ==
- Obour
- List of cities and towns in Egypt
