= Hung Yen University of Technology and Education =

University in Hưng Yên Province, Vietnam

Coordinates: 20.938317°N 106.31239°E

- Trường Đại học Sư phạm Kỹ thuật Hưng Yên
- Former name: University of Technical Education in Hưng Yên
- Type: Government-funded
- Established: January 2003
- President: Bui Trung Thanh, Ph.D. associate professor
- Location: Khoái Châu district, Hưng Yên Province, Vietnam
- Campus: Khoái Châu, Mỹ Hào and Hải Dương campus

Hung Yen University Technology and Engineering is a public university located in Hung Yen Province, Vietnam. Its functions include application-oriented teaching and training technology engineers and technical teachers.

== History ==
On December 21, 1966, Hung Yen Industrial High School under the Ministry of Heavy Industry was established under Decision No. 1265 /BCNNg/KH of the Ministry of Heavy Industry.

On December 3, 1970, the school belonged to the General Department of Technical Workers Training, Ministry of Labor with the name of Vocational School, with the task of training vocational teachers for Technical Workers' schools and vocational training institutions.

On March 5, 1979, the school was upgraded to Technical Education College I of the General Department of Vocational Training according to Decision No. 80 / TTg of the prime minister.

From July 1, 1987, the school was directly under the Ministry of Education and Training.

On June 1, 2003, the school was upgraded to Hung Yen University of Technical Education through Decision No. 04/2003 / QD-TTg, a public school directly under the Ministry of Education and Training.

== Location ==
- Headquarters: Dan Tien Commune, Khoai Chau District, Hung Yen Province, Vietnam.
- My Hao Campus: Nhan Hoa Ward, My Hao Town, Hung Yen Province, Vietnam.
- Hai Duong Campus: 68 Do Ngoc Du, Tan Binh Ward, Hai Duong City, Hai Duong Province, Vietnam.

== Governance ==
- President: Assoc. Prof. Dr. Bui Trung Thanh.
- Vice Presidents:Dr. Nguyen Minh Quy.
- Chair of University Council: Assoc. Prof. Dr. Chu Van Tuan.

== Training areas ==
Hung Yen University of Technology and Education is currently training 29 university majors, 8 master's and 2 doctoral degrees, namely:

PhD programs:

1. Mechanical engineering;

2. Electronic engineering.

Masters:

1. Mechanical engineering;

2. Electronic engineering;

3. Control engineering and automation;

4. Electrical engineering (intensive Electrical System);

5. Information technology;

6. Chemical engineering;

7. Automobile engineering;

8. Business administration;

9. Mechatronics.

Bachelors:

Information Technology

- Computer technology
- Computer networks and communications
- Software engineering

Electrical and Electronics Engineering

- Industrial automation
- Industrial electronics
- Electrical system
- Electronics and telecommunications
- Automatic control

Mechanical Engineering

- Welding technology
- Computer-Aided mechanical technology designs

Mechatronics engineering technology

- Mechatronics engineering
- Maintenance and Mechatronics Engineering Technology
- Refrigeration Engineering and Air conditioning

Automotive engineering technology

- Automotive engineering technology
- Mechatronics of automobiles and specialized vehicles

Technology pedagogy

Garment technology

- Garment technology
- Fashion Design
- Merchandising

Business administration

- Technology business administration
- Marketing products and services

Accounting (Business accounting)

Economics (Investment economics)

Chemical engineering technology

- Applied chemical engineering
- Production quality management and industrial environment - QA / QC / ISO14001

Environmental technology

- Environmental engineering
- Management of environment and labor safety

English linguistics

== Staffs ==
Total number of staff (as of September 2018): 602 people. Specifically, there are 04 Professors, 33 Associate Professors, 93 PhDs, 132 PhDs, 246 Masters, 4 Master's students, 47 bachelors and other qualifications: 43.

In which the teaching team consists of 459 people, including 04 Professors, 33 Associate Professors, 93 PhDs, 130 PhDs, 196 Masters, 03 Master's students.

== Faculties ==
Currently the University has 11 faculties and 1 division.

== Departments – Centers – Campuses ==
- Department of Human Resource
- Department of Academic Affairs
- Department of Financial Accounting
- Department of Administration
- Department of Inspection and Legal Issues
- Department of Student Affairs
- Department of Science and Technology Management and International Cooperation
- Department of Equipment and Construction
- Department of Quality Assurance
- Center for Admissions and Communications
- Library Information Center
- My Hao campus
- Hai Duong campus
