= Lạc Hồng University =

University in Đồng Nai Province, Vietnam

Coordinates: 10.9545°N 106.8023°E

- Type: University
- Established: August 8, 1997
- Address: 10 Huỳnh Văn Nghệ, Bửu Long, Biên Hòa, Đồng Nai, Vietnam
- Campus: Urban/Suburban
- Website: en.lhu.edu.vn

Lạc Hồng University (Vietnamese: Đại Học Lạc Hồng) is a university in Đồng Nai Province. Established in 1997, it marks the first university of the province.

As an educational establishment with interdisciplinary and multi-level training, LHU offers programs in vocational training, college, bachelor of arts and postgraduate degrees. It has 12 faculties and 21 majors with an enrollment of more than 20,000 students.
