= Exercise Eskimo =

A military exercise named Exercise Eskimo was held in the winter of 1944–45, in Saskatchewan to test existing methods of winter warfare by Canadian Army and the United States Army Air Corps. The troops would arrive in Prince Albert, Saskatchewan by train and then move to their destinations which were often further north. Montreal Lake was a target area for dropping supplies by B-17 Flying Fortress and the then secret B-29.

Colour motion picture footage of the exercise was released in the CBC miniseries "The War in Colour".
