= Cold-weather warfare =

Warfare in cold temperatures

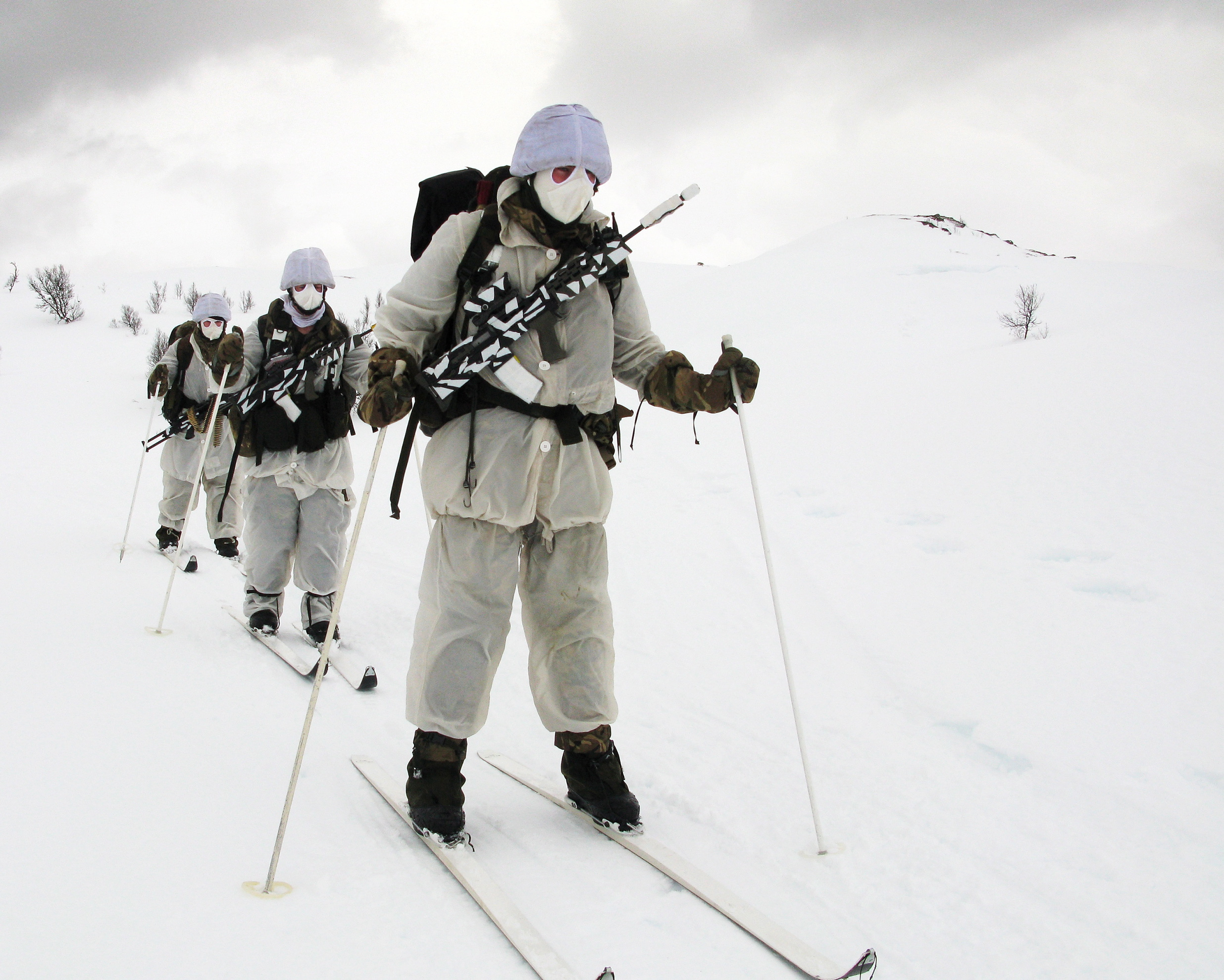
United Kingdom Royal Marine reservists training for winter operations in Norway in 2014

Cold-weather warfare, also known as cold-region warfare, arctic warfare or winter warfare, encompasses military operations affected by snow, ice, thawing conditions, or cold, both on land and at sea, as well as the strategies and tactics used by military forces in these situations and environments.

Cold-weather conditions occur year-round at high elevation or latitudes, and elsewhere materialize seasonally during the winter period. Mountain warfare often takes place in cold weather or on terrain that is affected by ice and snow, such as the Alps and the Himalayas. Historically, most such operations have been during winter in the Northern Hemisphere. Some have occurred above the Arctic Circle where snow, ice, and cold may occur throughout the year.

At times, cold—or its aftermath, thaw—has been a decisive factor in the failure of a campaign, as with the French invasion of Russia in 1812, the Soviet invasion of Finland in 1939, and the German invasion of the Soviet Union during World War II.

== History ==
Northern and Eastern Europe were the venues for some well-documented winter campaigns. During World War II several actions took place above the Arctic Circle. Recent cold-weather conflicts have occurred in the Himalayas.

=== Pre–1800 ===
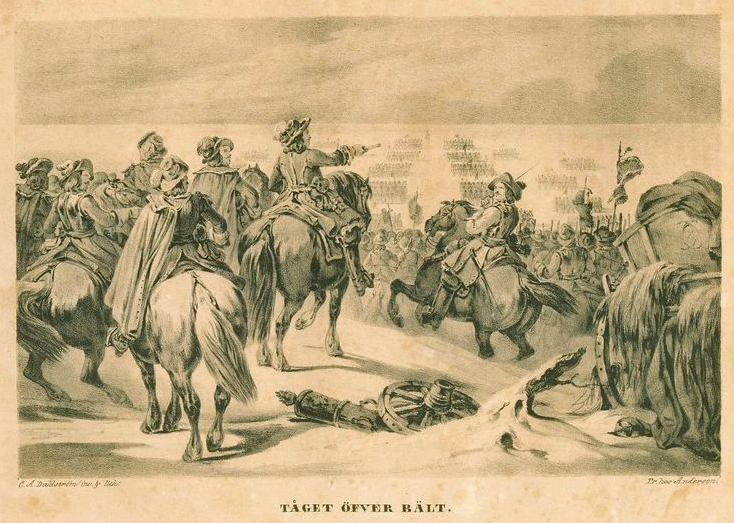
The 1658 March Across the Belts in the Second Northern War

In 1242, the Teutonic Order lost the Battle on the Ice on Lake Peipus to Novgorod. In 1520, the decisive Battle of Bogesund between Sweden and Denmark occurred on the ice of lake Åsunden.

In 1643 or 1644, Prince Rupert made an abortive attack on the Parliamentarian stronghold of Aylesbury, England. 500 men are reported to have frozen to death on 21 January. On 25 January a sudden thaw caused a bridge to collapse over the River Weaver, splitting Royalist cavalry forces at the Battle of Nantwich resulting in their defeat.

The 1557 Siege of Katsurayama was fought between the forces of the Japanese daimyō Takeda Shingen and Uesugi Kenshin as part of the Kawanakajima campaigns. Katsurayama castle was a strategically vital Uesugi stronghold in the contested Shinano Province and, when it was isolated from reinforcements due to late snow in early 1557, the Takeda clan used this opportunity to seize it under Baba Nobuharu, shielded from view by heavy snowfall.

Sweden and Denmark fought several wars during the 16th and 17th centuries. As a great deal of Denmark consists of islands, it was usually safe from invasion, but in January 1658, most of the Danish waters froze. Charles X Gustav of Sweden led his army across the ice of the Belts to besiege Copenhagen. The war ended with the treaty of Roskilde, a treaty very favorable to the Swedish.

During the Great Northern War, Swedish king Charles XII set off to invade Moscow, but was eventually defeated at the Battle of Poltava after being weakened by cold weather and scorched earth tactics. Sweden suffered more casualties during the same war as Carl Gustaf Armfeldt with 6,000 men tried to invade Trondheim. Three thousand of them died of exposure in the snow during the Carolean Death March.

=== 19th century ===
During the Finnish War, the Russian army unexpectedly crossed the frozen Gulf of Bothnia from Finland to Åland and, by 19 March 1809, reached the Swedish shore within 70 kilometres (43 mi) from the Swedish capital, Stockholm. This daring maneuvre decided the outcome of the war.

Napoleon's invasion of Russia in 1812 resulted in retreat in the face of winter with the majority of the French army succumbing to frostbite and starvation, rather than combat injuries.

The Battle of Weihaiwei was a battle of the First Sino-Japanese War in the winter of 1895 in Weihai, Shandong, China between the forces of the Japan and Qing China. Through a well coordinated offensive of both naval and land forces, hampered by snow and cold, the Japanese destroyed the forts on shore and sank much of the Chinese fleet.

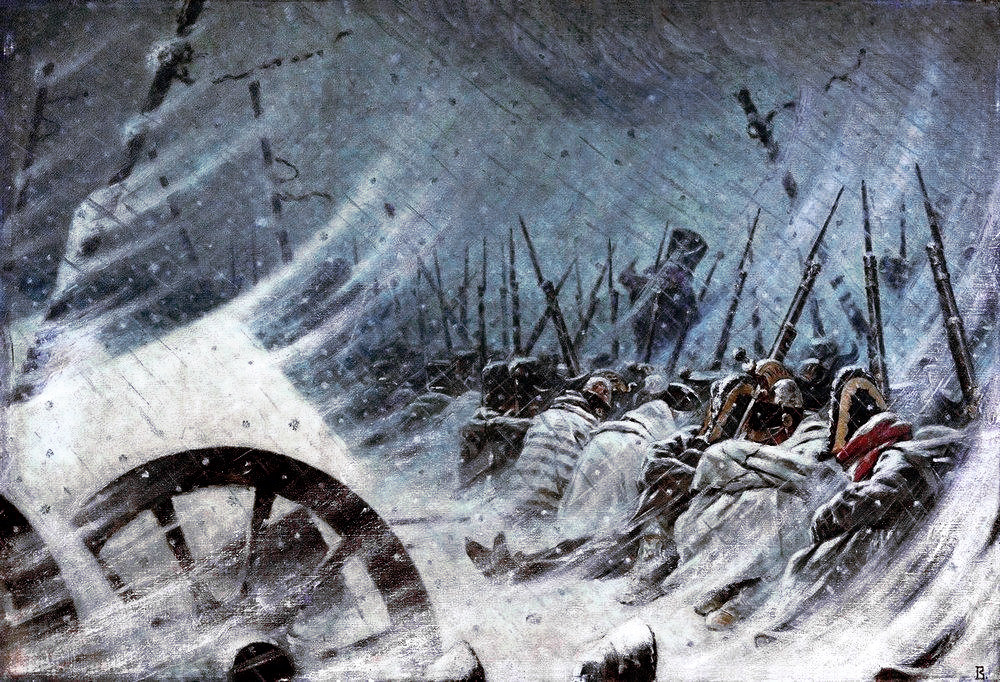
A bivouac of Napoleon's army during retreat from Russia in 1812

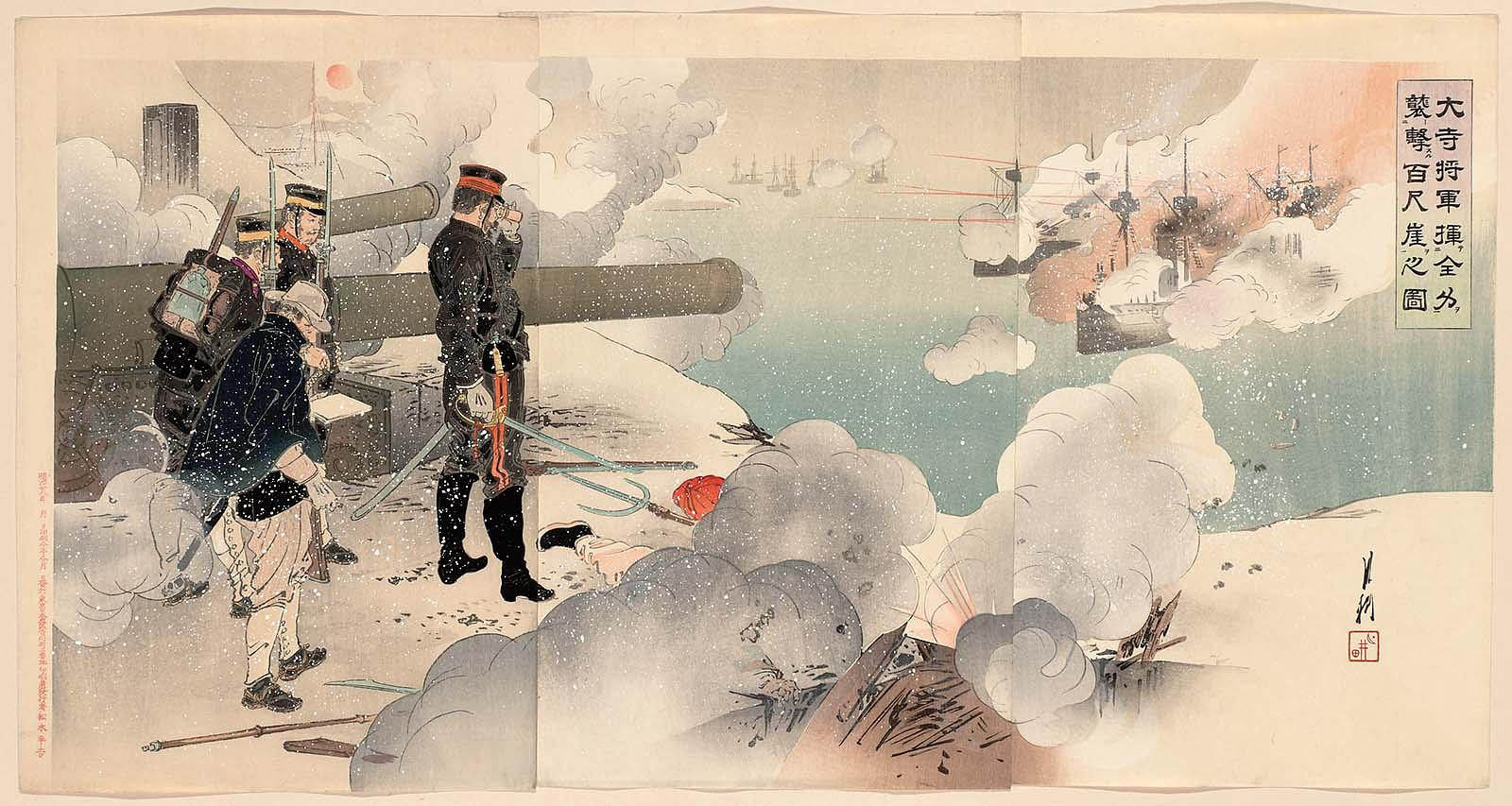
Japanese troops during the 1895 Battle of Weihaiwei

=== 20th century ===
==== World War I ====
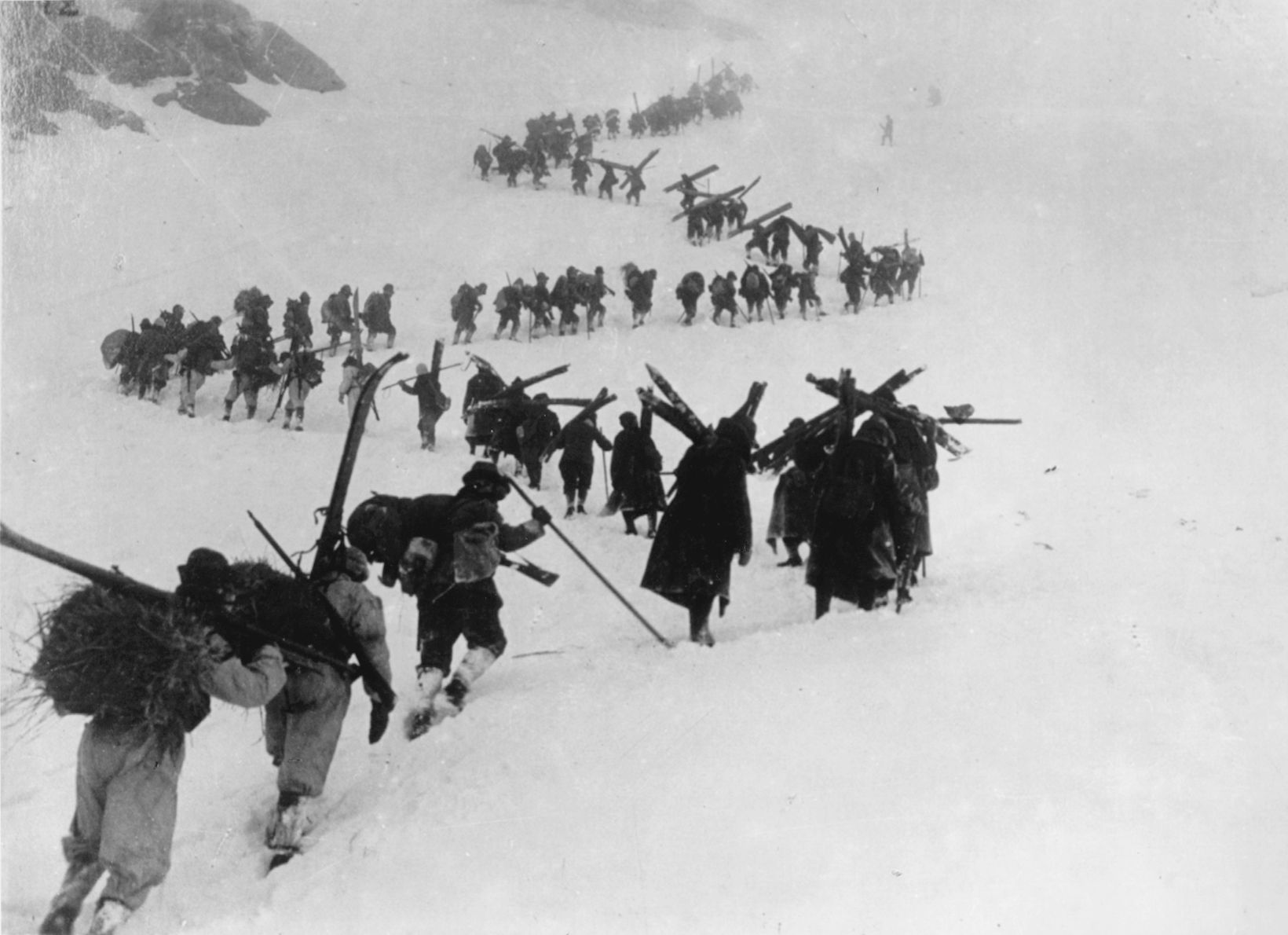
Italian mountain troops in WWI

During the First World War, soldiers on the Western front involved in trench warfare were forced to deal with freezing conditions, trench foot, frostbite, and disease. The winter of 1916-17 was exceptionally cold, which caused great hardship and deaths among the soldiers. Equipment and vehicles also were not suited for the freezing conditions.

At the Battle of Sarikamish, Ottoman troops were unprepared for winter fighting and suffered major losses, with 25,000 freezing to death before the battle even began.

On the Italian front, fighting bogged down in trench warfare but at mountain elevations. On White Friday, thousands of troops from both Italy and Austria-Hungary were killed in avalanches in the Dolomites.

==== World War II ====
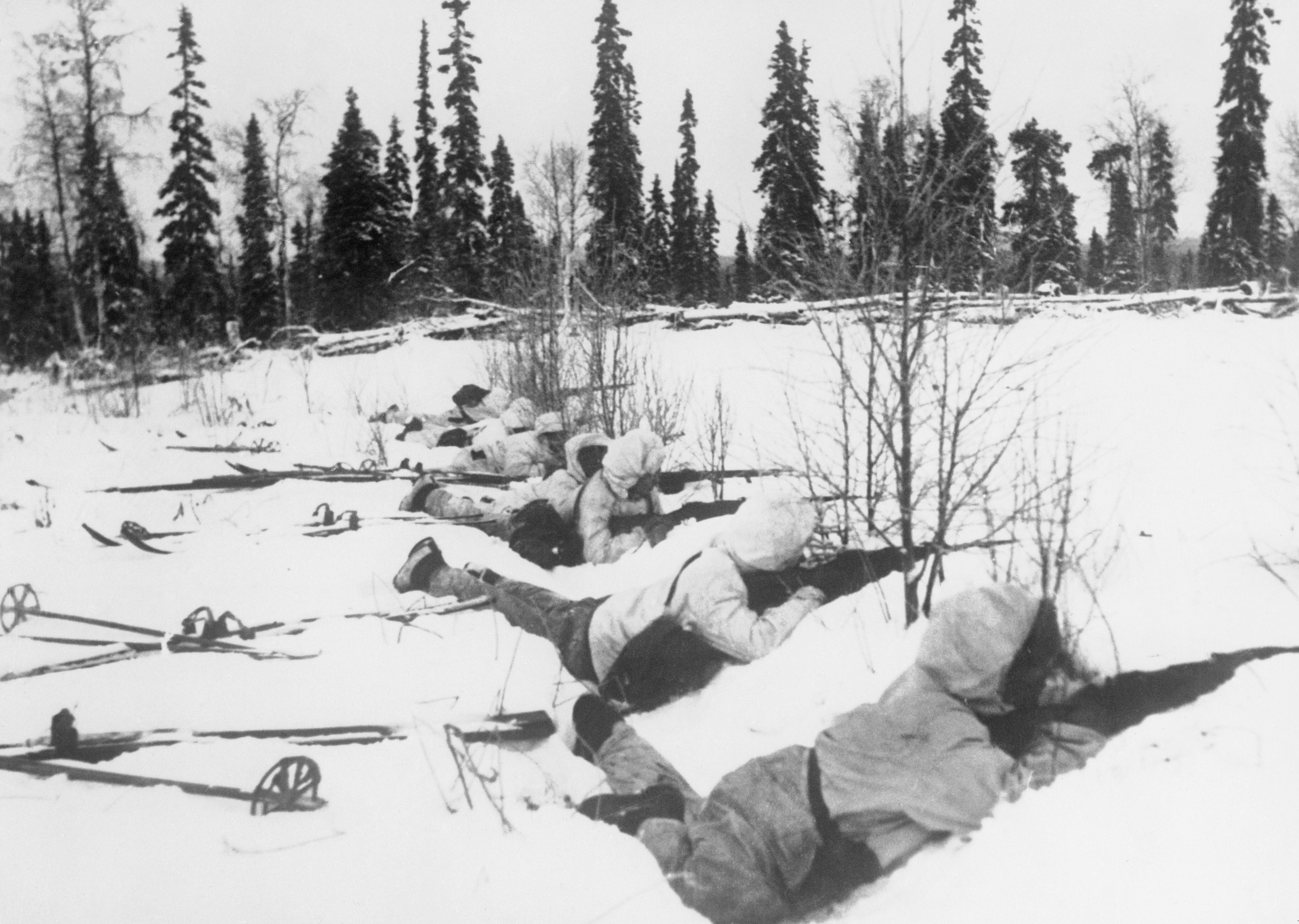
Finnish ski troops during the 1939 Winter War

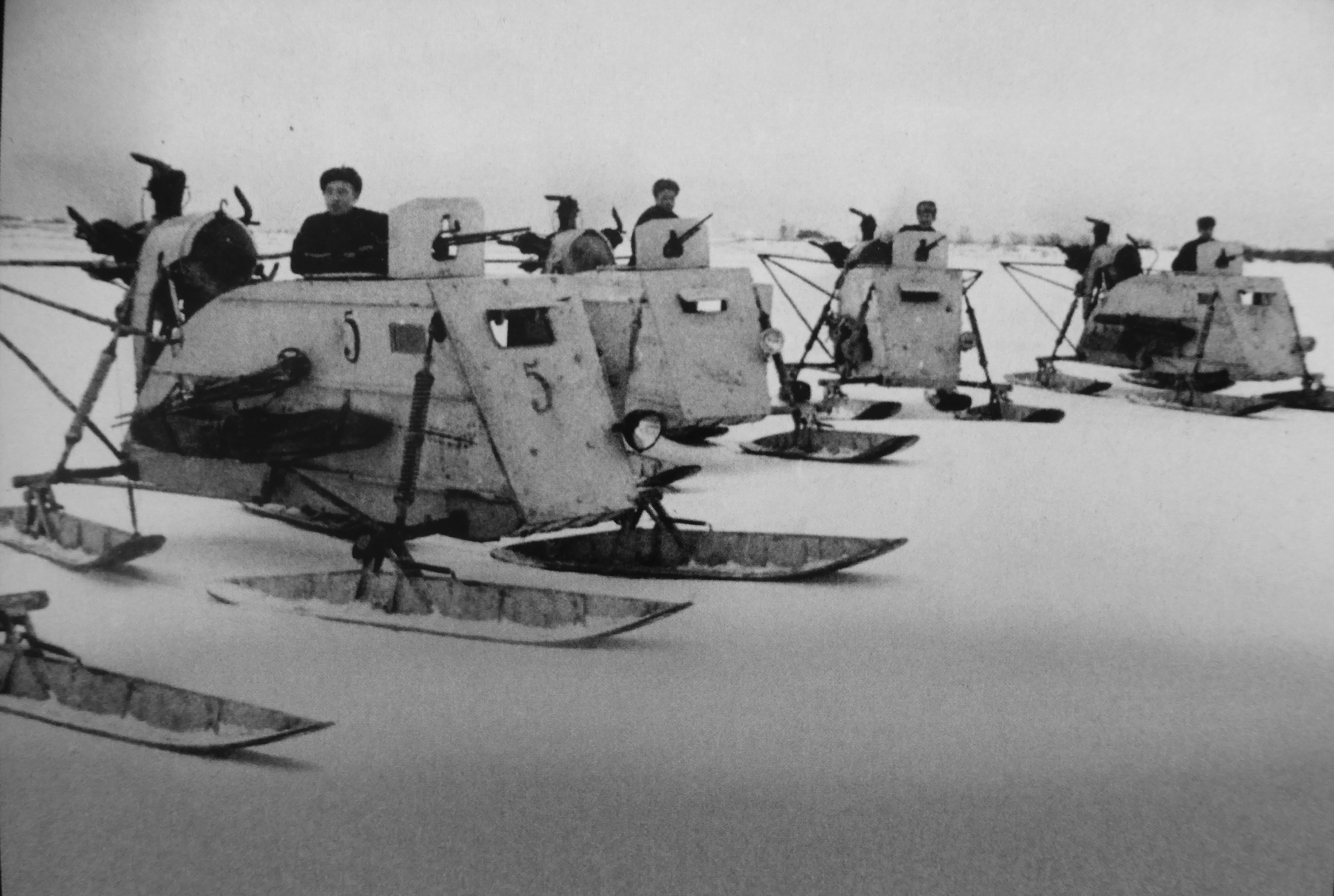
NKL-26 aerosledges of Soviet 44th Separate Aerosledge Battalion near Novgorod, January 1944

The Finnish Army used ski troops during the Winter War and the Second World War in which the numerically superior but road-bound Soviet forces were vulnerable to attack by mobile, white-clad ski troops, approaching from untracked, frozen terrain.

The Wehrmacht maintained elite mountain troops, Gebirgsjäger. They were organized in small, specialized units, which relied on pack animals. Typical weapons were light machine guns, mortars, and anti-tank guns. Control of ridge lines was paramount, using a limited number of outposts. They operated on the principles of fewer arms, but more ammunition per weapon and the economical use thereof.

In Operation Barbarossa in 1941, both Russian and German soldiers had to endure terrible conditions during the Russian winter. The German-Finnish joint offensive against Murmansk (Operation Silver Fox) in 1941 saw heavy fighting in the Arctic environment. Subsequently, the Petsamo-Kirkenes Operation conducted by the Soviet Army against the Wehrmacht in 1944 in northern Finland and Norway drove the Germans out. In late 1944, Finland turned against its former cobelligerents of Nazi Germany under Soviet pressure and pressured the Germans to withdraw in the ensuing Lapland War. While use of ski infantry was common in the Soviet Army, Germany formed only one division for movement on skis. From June 1942 to August 1943, the United States and Canada fought the Japanese in the Aleutian Islands Campaign in the Alaska Territory.

==== In the Arctic ====
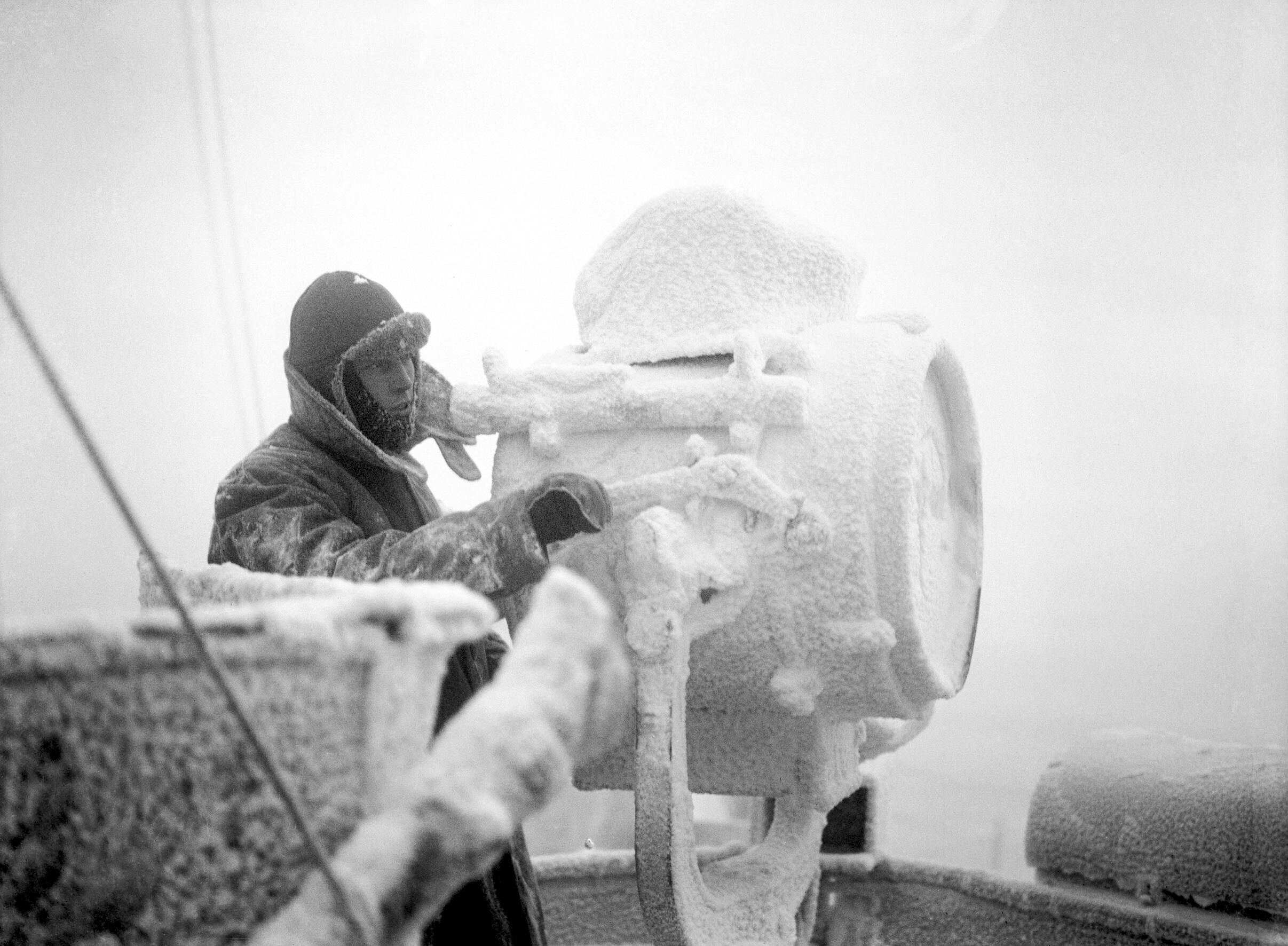
Rime ice on a 20-inch (51 cm) signal projector on the cruiser, HMS Sheffield (C24), escorting a 1941 Arctic convoy to the Soviet Union in World War II

The following actions were fought in the Arctic by land and naval forces in World War II between 1941 and 1945 in the following theaters of operations:

Finland – The Winter War was a military conflict between the Soviet Union (USSR) and Finland. It began with a Soviet invasion of Finland on 30 November 1939, three months after the outbreak of World War II, and ended three and a half months later with the Moscow Peace Treaty on 13 March 1940.

In the Battle of Suomussalmi, Finns leveraged cold weather to disadvantage the Soviet enemy troops by targeting field kitchens and campfires for their attacks, thereby denying those troops warmth and nutrition. The Finns rotated their troops so that they could regularly return to warm shelters to recuperate after an attack or patrol. Heavy Soviet equipment and their associated troops were restricted to roads, while Finnish ski troops had broad mobility to outflank the enemy. The threat of Finnish snipers, whom the Russians called "cuckoos", further demoralized the Soviets. The Finns mined ice routes over lakes to sink Soviet equipment.

The Lapland War was fought between Finland and Germany from September 1944 to April 1945 in Finland's northernmost Lapland Province. It included:

- Operation Birke (birch) was a German operation late in World War II in Finnish Lapland to protect access to nickel.
- Operation Nordlicht (northern lights) was a German scorched-earth retreat operation in Finland during the end of World War II.
- The Petsamo–Kirkenes Offensive was a major military offensive during World War II, mounted by the Soviet Army against the Wehrmacht in 1944 in northern Finland and Norway.

Norway – The liberation of Finnmark was a military operation, lasting from 23 October 1944 until 26 April 1945, in which Soviet and Norwegian forces wrestled away control of Finnmark, the northernmost county of Norway, from Germany. It started with a major Soviet offensive that liberated Kirkenes.

Northern Russia – Operation Silver Fox was a joint German–Finnish military operation offensive during World War II. It failed to achieve its main goal to cut off and ultimately capture the key Soviet port at Murmansk through attacks from Finnish and Norwegian territory.

Spitsbergen – Operation Gauntlet was a Combined Operations raid by Canadian troops, with British Army logistics support and Free Norwegian Forces servicemen on the Norwegian island of Spitsbergen, 600 miles (970 km) south of the North Pole, from 25 August to 3 September 1941. Operation Fritham was a Norwegian military operation, based from British soil, that had the goal of securing the rich coal mines on the island of Spitsbergen (a part of Svalbard) and denying their use to Nazi Germany. Operation Zitronella (Citronella) was an eight-hour German raid on Spitzbergen on 8 September 1943. This marks the highest latitude at which a land battle has ever been fought. However, given the extreme conditions, the German and Allied troops were at times compelled to assist each other to survive.

United States – The Aleutian Islands Campaign was a campaign conducted by both the United States and Imperial Japan from 3 June 1942 to 15 August 1943 in Attu and Kiska, part of the Aleutian Islands in Alaska during World War II.

==== Post World War II ====
Comparison of Chinese and U.S. military winter field uniforms, 1951

The Battle of Chosin Reservoir was a stark example of cold affecting military operations in the Korean War. There were many cold injuries and malfunctions of materiel, both vehicles and weapons.

The Sino-Indian War was a Himalayan border conflict between China and India that occurred in 1962. India initiated a Forward Policy in which it placed outposts along the border in 1961. China launched simultaneous offensives in Ladakh and across the McMahon Line on 20 October 1962. Chinese troops advanced over Indian forces in both theaters. Much of the fighting took place in harsh mountain conditions, entailing large-scale combat at altitudes of over 4,000 metres (14,000 feet). Many troops on both sides succumbed to the freezing cold temperatures.

Argentine troops suffered from cold-wet conditions, holding positions in the 1982 Falklands War.

The Siachen conflict is a military confrontation between India and Pakistan over the disputed Siachen Glacier region in Kashmir. The conflict began in 1984 with India's successful Operation Meghdoot during which it gained control over all of the Siachen Glacier. A cease-fire went into effect in 2003.

=== Historical lessons learned ===
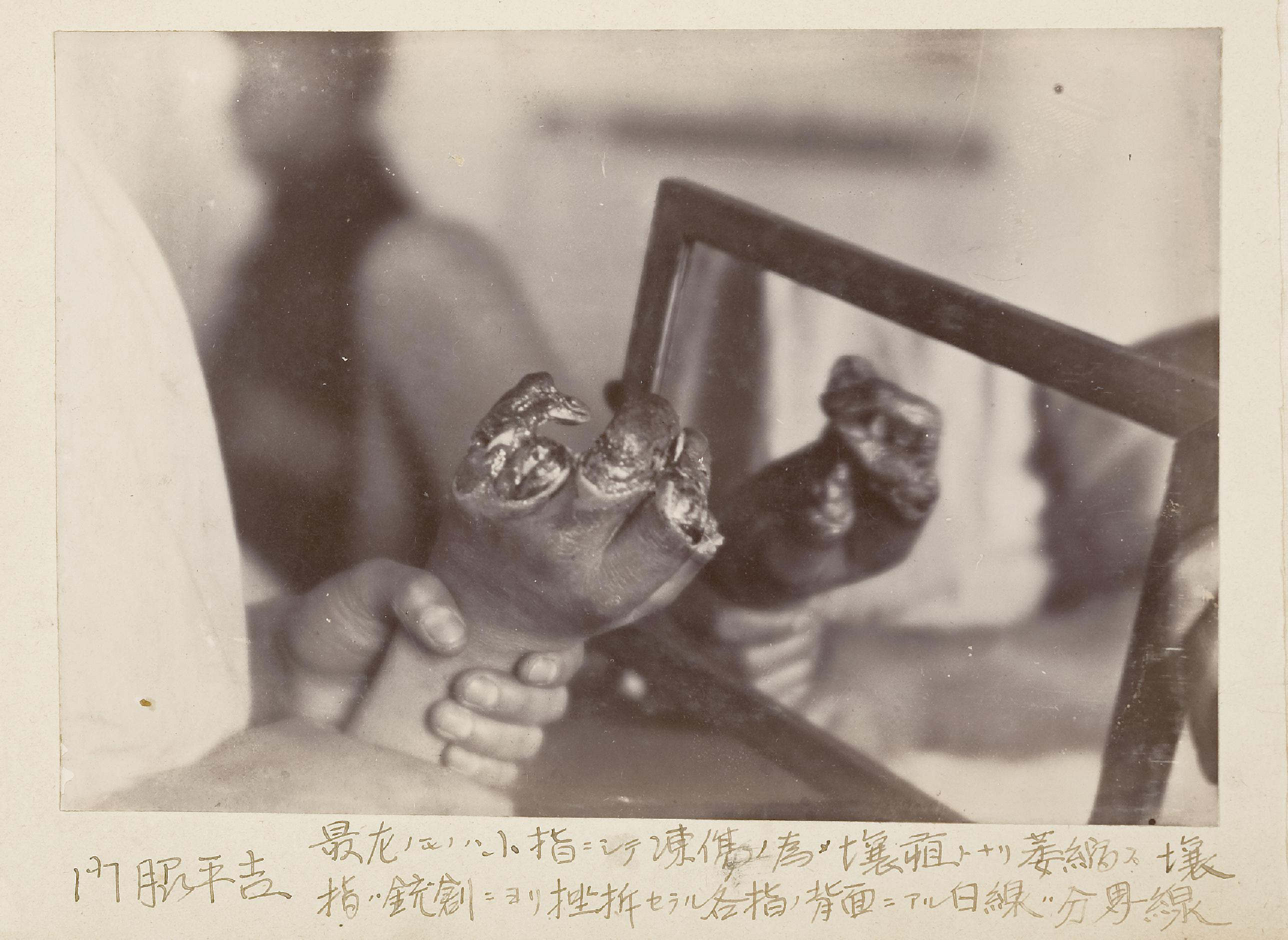
Frostbitten hand with gangrene, suffered by a Japanese soldier in the Sino-Japanese War, winter of 1894–5

Paton offered a 2001 overview of human factors pertaining to cold in military operations. The understanding of cold injuries evolved in the 19th and 20th centuries; understanding of the causes and treatment of frostbite and trench foot improved. In the Sino-Japanese War, the Japanese learned the importance of foot care, keeping feet dry and warm with replacement socks. In World War I, doctors realized that trench foot was a prolonged exposure to cold, wet conditions on the feet, which were exacerbated by the use of tight puttees, bandage-like leg wrappings.

The Soviet invasion of Finland during the Winter War showed the power of asymmetric warfare on the Finnish side, where small units were able to separate the road-bound Soviet invading troops into segments, and attack each segment individually. The small units arrived silently on skis or with light artillery pulled by reindeer over frozen, untracked terrain, using winter conditions as an advantage. Although the Soviet Union gained territory from the Finns, it was at the cost of 200,000 fatalities against 25,000 on the Finnish side.

The German invasion of the Soviet Union induced more than 250,000 cold injuries in one year. The French Army occupying the Maginot Line experienced 12,000 cold injuries. Experiences from the disastrous 1941 German advance on Moscow in winter conditions led to the 1942 Taschenbuch für den Winterkrieg ("Pocket book for Winter War"), which highlighted ideal approaches to handling winter, but acknowledged that improvisation in the field would be necessary when supplies were lacking. The Soviet troops in that period had felt-lined boots and quilted uniforms, but the Germans continued fighting in their summer uniforms.

==== German handbook ====
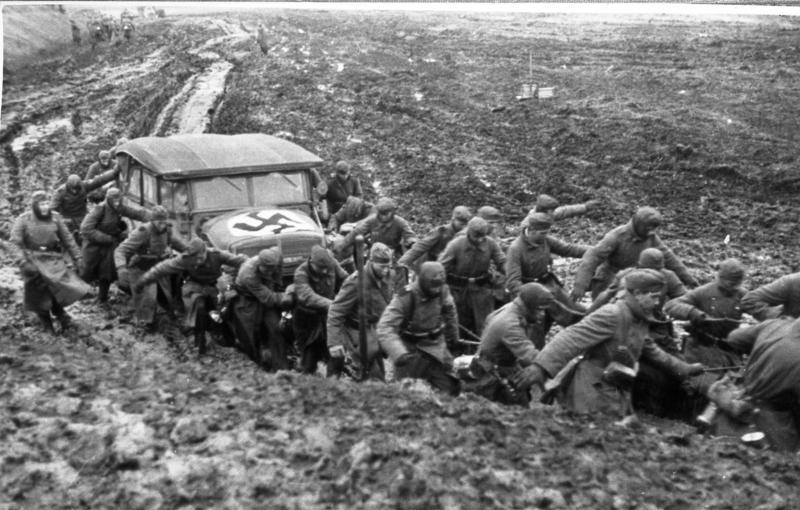
German troops extricating vehicle from the November 1941 mud in the Eastern Front

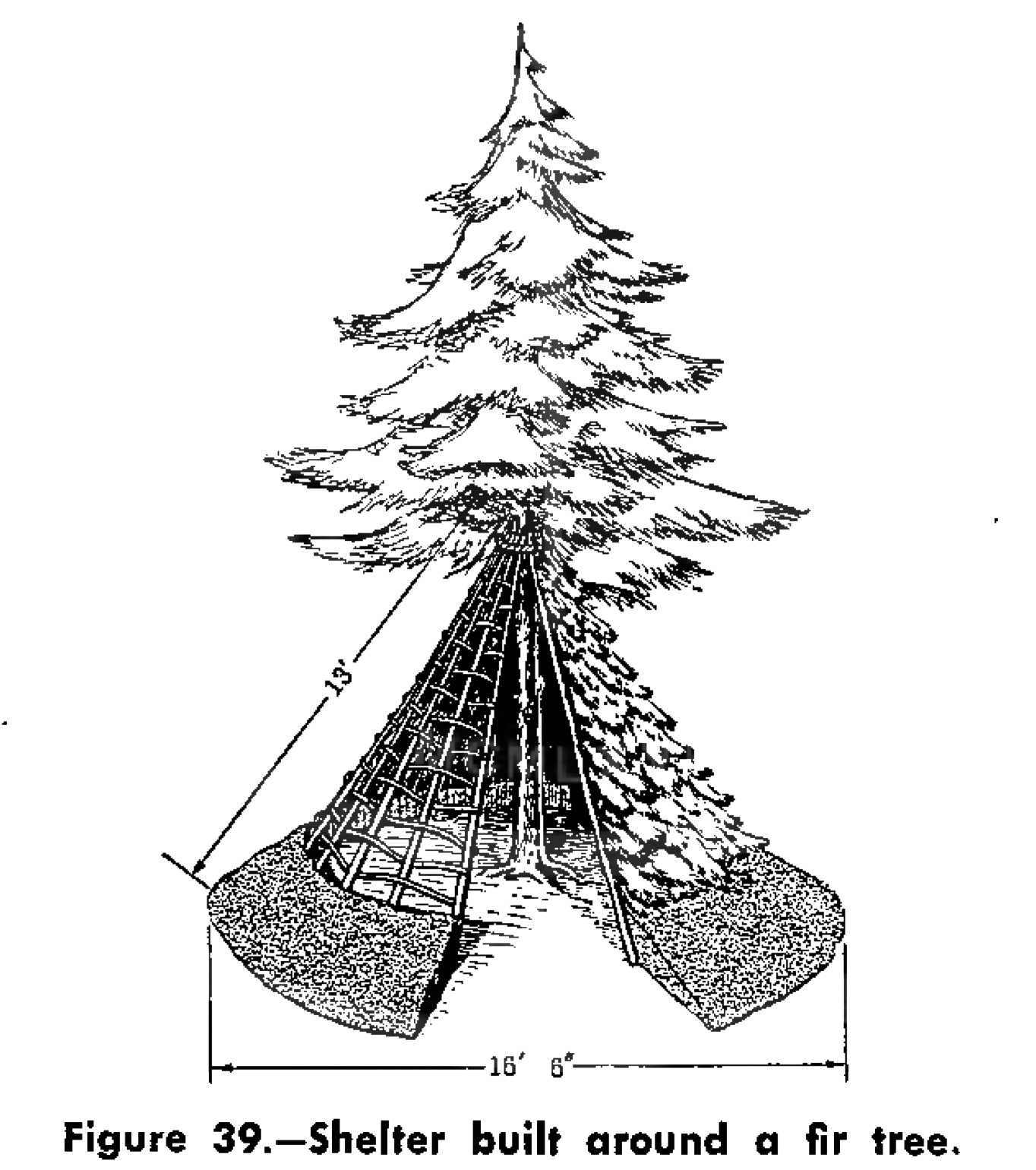
Improvised shelter around a fir tree, adapted from the 1942 German Taschenbuch für den Winterkrieg

The Taschenbuch für den Winterkrieg manual contains sections on the influence and duration of winter, the seasons of mud and thaw, preparation for winter warfare, winter combat methods and maintaining morale, including the use of reading material, lectures, movies, and "strength through joy" exercises. Other sections cover marches, the maintenance of roads, winter bivouacs and shelter, construction of winter positions, camouflage and concealment, identification of the enemy, clothing, rations, evacuation of the wounded, care and use of weapons and equipment, signal communication, and winter mobility. The manual was designed to provide information at the officer level for indoctrination of troops via the non-commissioned officer ranks. The scope of the manual is to train troops in the following areas:

- Protection of personnel, vehicles and weapons against snow and cold
- Training personnel to be hardened against the conditions encountered and able to improvise shelter from found materials
- Mobility on skis, winter roads, ice crossings, and conversion of wheeled vehicles into tracked versions
- Construction of positions and obstacles in frozen terrain
- Combat in deep snow and severe cold

Some highlights include addressing:

- Human factors – Providing the right level of clothing to maintain agility and avoid overheating. Maintaining a slow, steady marching pace to avoid chilling down in the wind. Boosting morale with up-to-date newspapers from home and nearby areas. Providing improvised shelters and bivouacs. Hygiene, emphasizing cleanliness.
- Mobility – Setting up and maintaining winter roads and trails. Warming up engines for reliable starting.
- Positions and fortifications – Using logs and snow as materials to provide trenches and gun emplacements.
- Care of equipment – Keeping equipment dry, when possible, and substituting low-temperature lubricants for oils and hydraulic fluids.

==== Soviet experience ====
The Soviet Army learned from its 1939–40 Winter War experiences and the 1941 German advance on Moscow. The high command realized that it must prepare entire divisions for winter warfare in 1942, beginning with warm uniforms, winter equipment (skis, etc.), and training for winter operations. Analysis of previous experiences resulted in a series of manuals that covered flight, engineer, and combat arms operations in winter. Issues covered included:

- Flight operations – Reduced daylight, snow drifting, cold temperatures impeded the added need for air transport.
- Engineer operations – Engineer troops build new roadways, airfields, water crossings, and encampments with water supply. They destroy obstacles, requiring engineering equipment. Regular troops entrench tanks, construct tank obstacles, and build simple shelters.
- Combat arms operations – Addressing the German methods of defense with automatic weapons strongholds, supplemented with mines, wires, and anti-tank obstacles. Against these, the Russians used coordinated massed fire.

In his 1981 paper, Fighting the Russians in Winter: Three Case Studies, Chew draws on experiences from the Allied-Soviet War in Northern Russia during the Winter of 1918–19, the destruction of the Soviet 44th Motorized Rifle Division, and Nazi–Soviet Warfare during World War II to derive winter warfare factors pertaining to military tactics, materiel and personnel:

- Tactics – Defensive positions are highly advantageous because of the ability to maintain warmth and protection, compared to attacking in extreme cold. Mobility and logistical support are often restricted by snow, requiring plowing or compacting it to accommodate wide-tracked vehicles or sleds. Infantry movement in deep snow requires skis or snowshoes to avoid exhaustion. Sound carries well over crusted snow, diminishing the element of surprise. Explosives are useful for excavating foxholes and larger shelters in frozen ground. Attacking field kitchens and encampments deprives the enemy of food and shelter. Rapid removal of the wounded from the battlefield is essential to their survival in the cold.
- Materiel – Weapons and vehicles require special lubricants to operate at low temperatures. Mines are unreliable in winter, owing to deep snow that may cushion the fuse or form an ice bridge over the detonator.
- Personnel – Proper winter clothing is required to maintain body heat and to avoid such cold injuries as frostbite. Troop efficiency and survival requires either making use of available shelter or providing portable shelter.

== Land operations ==
Operational factors encompass planning for the climate and weather in which military operations are required with snow, ice, mud and cold being the primary considerations. Military tactics, materiel, combat engineering and military medicine all require specialized adaptations to the conditions encountered in cold weather.

=== Cold and mountainous regions ===
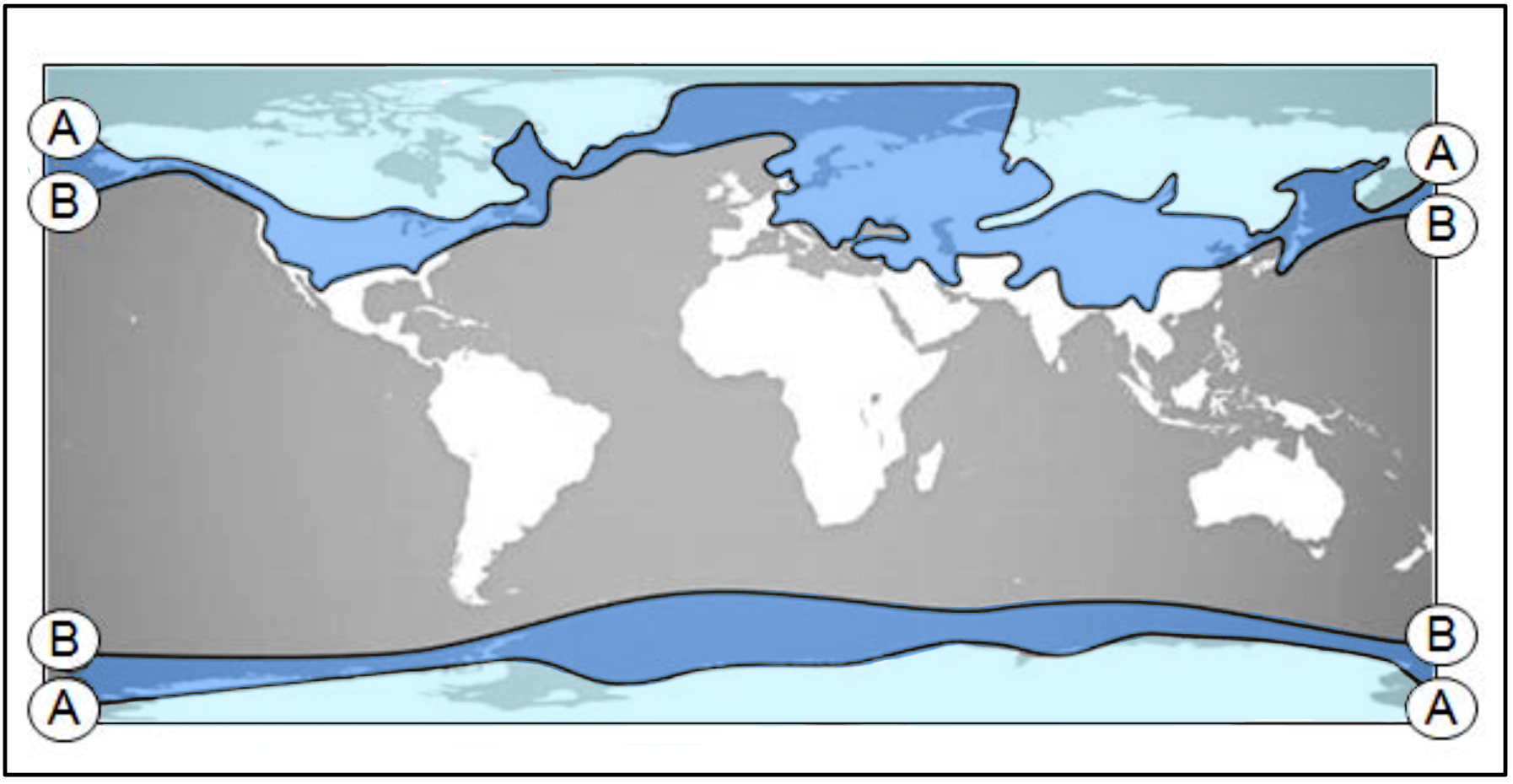
Cold regions that have a significant effect on military operations for one month or more each year. Severely cold Moderately cold

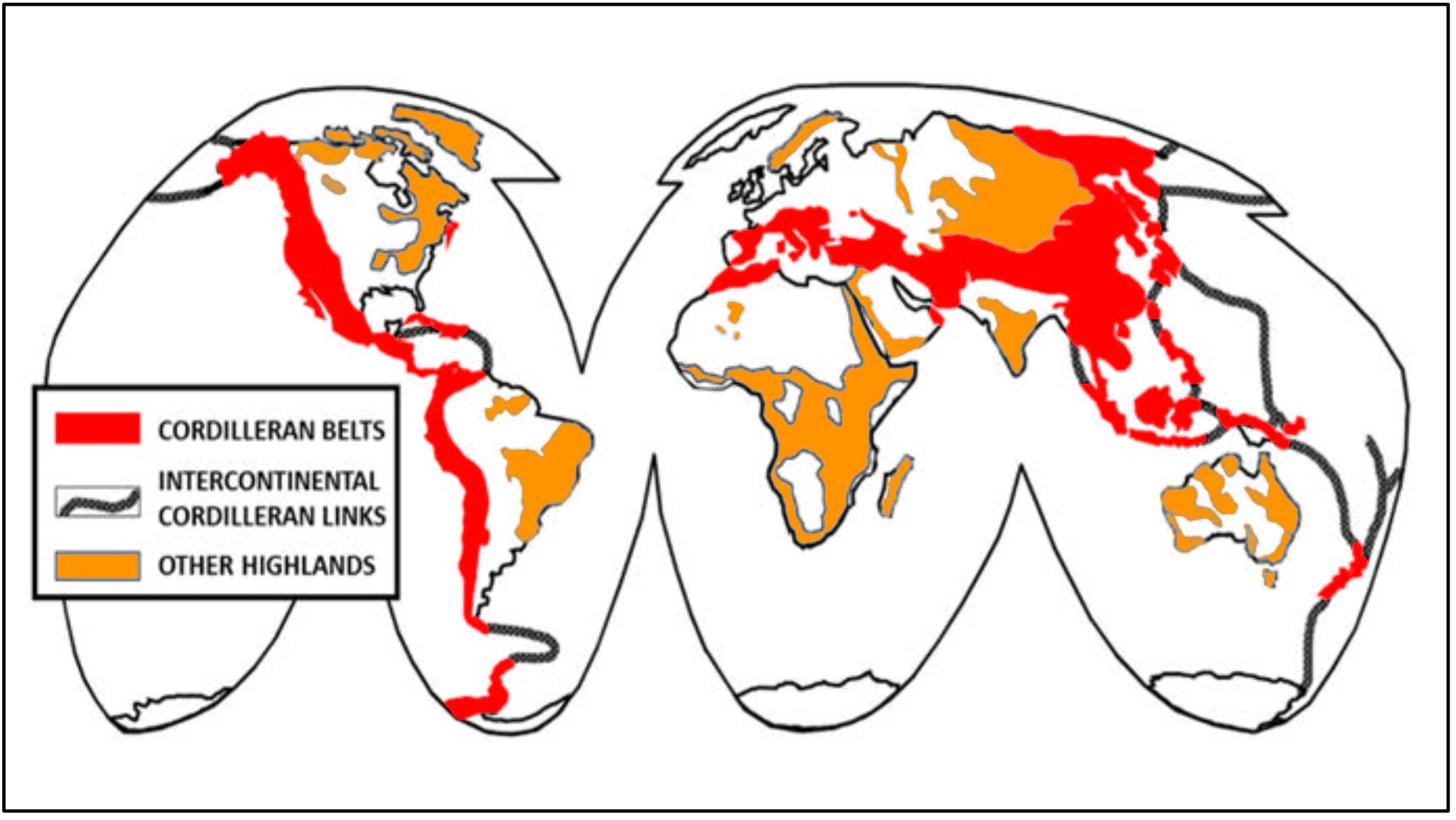
The principal mountain ranges of the world

In its 2016 "Mountain Warfare and Cold Weather Operations" manual, the United States Army defines cold regions as "where cold temperatures, unique terrain, and snowfall have a significant effect on military operations for one month or more each year." It describes regions that are either severely cold or moderately cold, each comprising approximately one quarter of the Earth's land mass.

- Severely cold – Where mean annual air temperatures stay below freezing, maximum snow depths exceed 60 centimetres (24 in), and ice covers lakes and rivers for more than 180 days each year.
- Moderately cold – Where the mean temperatures during the coldest month are below freezing.

The manual also delineates the principal mountain ranges of the world, which lie along broad belts which encircle the Pacific basin and then lead westward across Eurasia into North Africa. Secondarily, rugged chains of mountains lie along the Atlantic margins of the Americas and Europe.

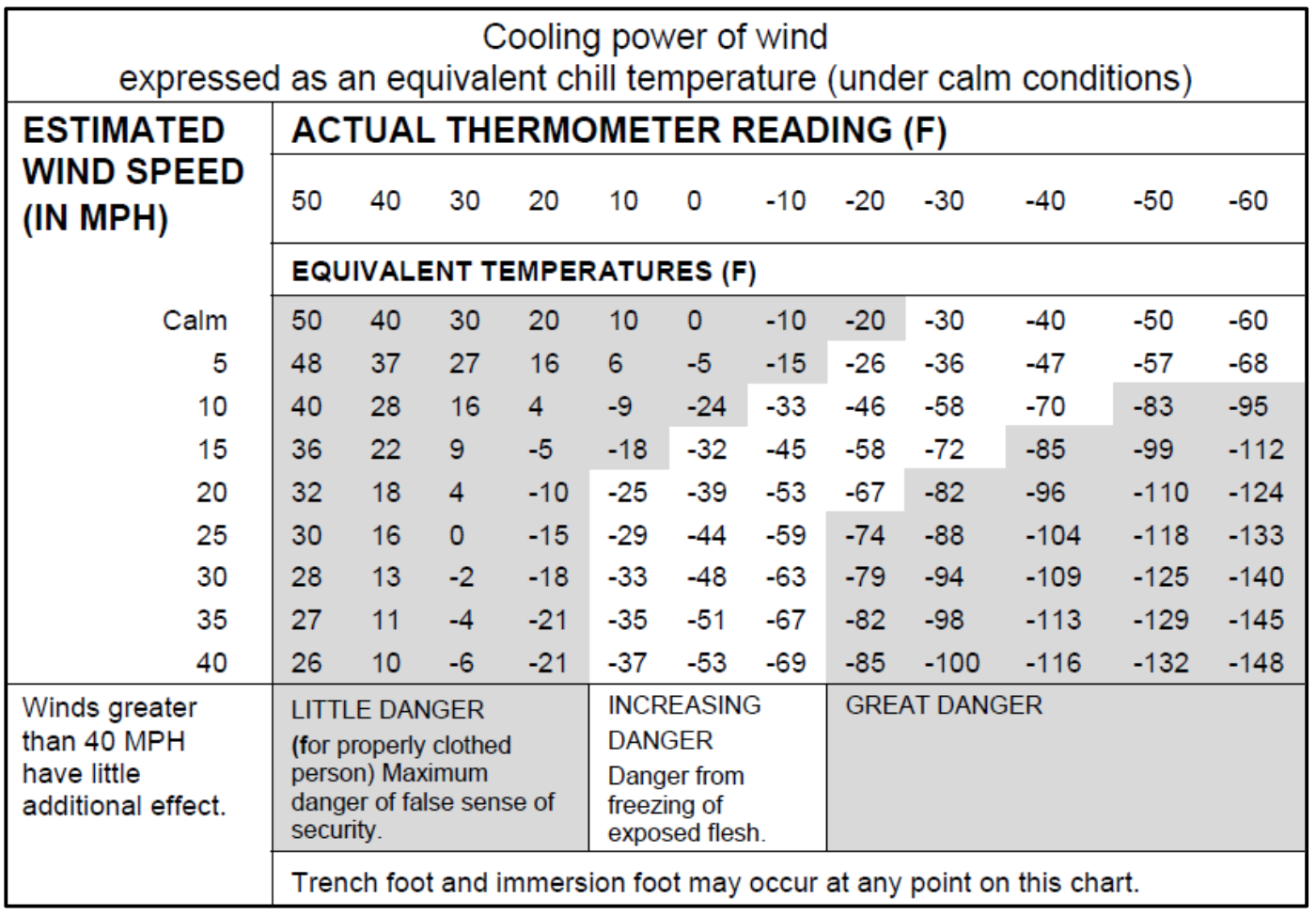
Cooling power of wind, expressed as an equivalent chill temperature under calm conditions

=== Weather conditions ===
Temperature, wind, snow, and thaw are the primary conditions that affect the winter battlescape.

==== Temperature ====
The U.S. Army groups cold temperatures using categories. The temperature categories are (with quoted summaries):

- Wet cold – From 39 to 20 °F (4 to −7 °C). Wet cold conditions occur when wet snow and rain often accompany wet cold conditions. This type of environment is more dangerous to troops and equipment than the colder, dry cold environments because the ground becomes slushy and muddy and clothing and equipment becomes perpetually wet and damp.
- Dry cold – From 19 to −4 °F (−7 to −20 °C). Dry cold conditions are easier to live in than wet cold conditions. Like in wet cold conditions, proper equipment, training and leadership are critical to successful operations. Wind chill is a complicating factor in this type of cold. The dry cold environment is the easiest of the four cold weather categories to survive in because of low humidity and the ground remains frozen. As a result, people and equipment are not subject to the effects of the thawing and freezing cycle, and precipitation is generally in the form of dry snow.
- Intense cold – From −5 to −25 °F (−21 to −32 °C). This temperature range can affect the mind as much as the body. Simple tasks take longer and require more effort than in warmer temperatures and the quality of work degrades as attention-to-detail diminishes. Clothing becomes more bulky to compensate for the cold so troops lose dexterity. Commanders consider these factors when planning operations and assigning tasks.
- Extreme cold – From −25 to −40 °F (−32 to −40 °C). In extreme cold the challenge of survival becomes paramount as personnel withdraw into themselves. Weapons, vehicles and munitions are likely to fail in this environment.
- Hazardous cold – From −40 °F (−40 °C) and below. Units require extensive training before operating in these temperature extremes.

The combined cooling effect of ambient temperature and wind (wind chill) is an important factor that affects troops.

==== Snow ====
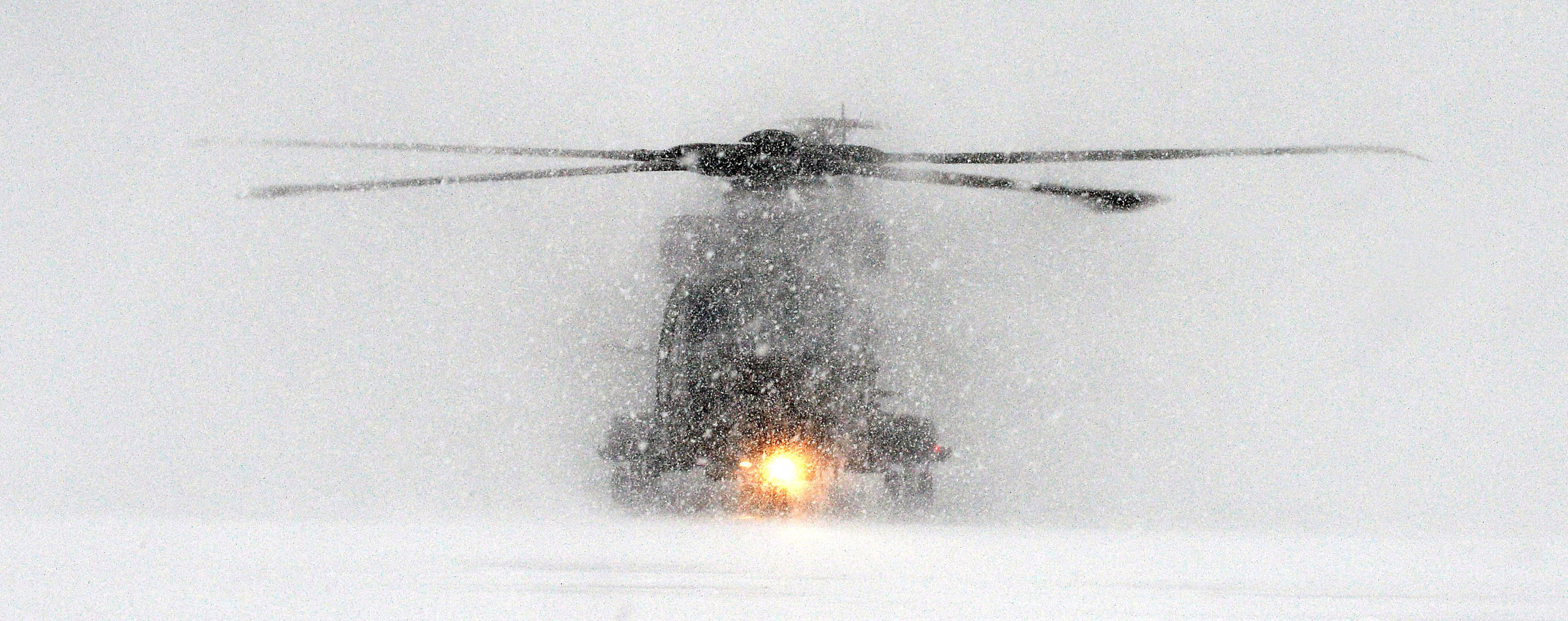
A Royal Navy Merlin Mk3 helicopter operating in heavy snow at the Bardufoss Air Station in Norway

For military purposes, the U.S. Army categorizes snow as light, moderate, or heavy. Each classification affects visibility and ground movement due to accumulation and is quoted below:

- Light snow – Visibility is equal to or greater than 5/8 mile (1,000 m) in falling snow. A trace to one inch (2.5 cm) per hour accumulates.
- Moderate snow – Visibility is 5/16 to 1/2 mile (500 to 800 m) in falling snow. One to three inches (2.5 to 7.6 cm) per hour accumulates.
- Heavy snow – Visibility is less than 1/4 mile (400 m) in falling snow. Three inches (7.6 cm) or more inches per hour accumulates.

Snow and snowdrifts can create advantages on the battlefield by filling in ditches and vehicle tracks and flattening the terrain. It also creates hollows on the downwind side of obstacles, such as trees, buildings, and bushes, which provide observation points or firing positions. Snowdrifts may provide cover for soldiers to approach an objective. Soviet Army doctrine cited 30 centimetres (12 in) as the threshold snow depth that impairs mobility for troops, cavalry and vehicles, except tanks for which the threshold was 50 centimetres (20 in).

==== Thaw ====
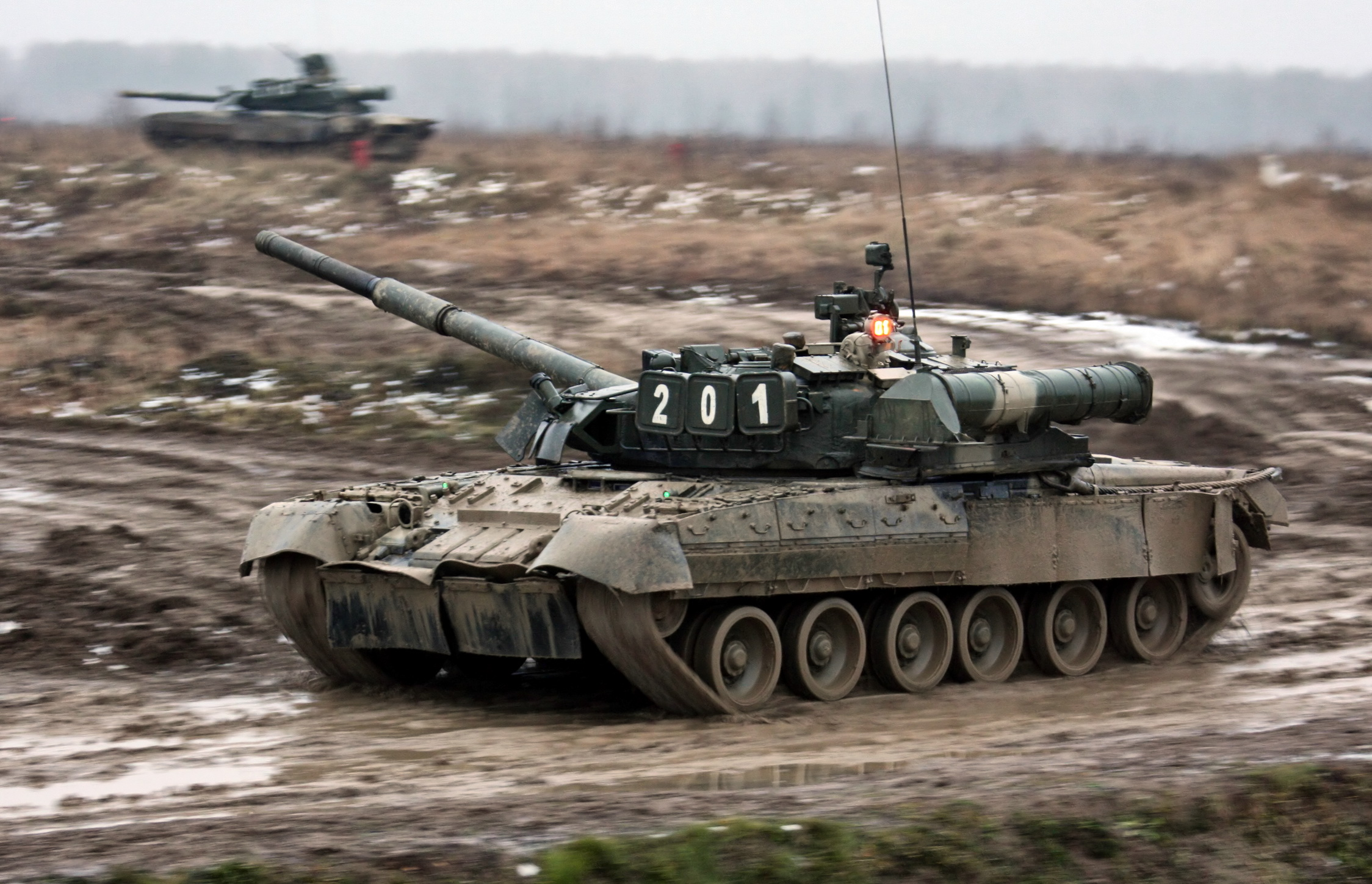
Russian T-80 main battle tank maneuvering in thawing conditions

Thawing conditions can impair mobility and put soldiers at risk of trench foot by turning soil to mud; it can also weaken and break up ice cover on bodies of water. Maintaining roads becomes more difficult during spring-thaw run-off periods and requires mud removal by heavy equipment. Slushy and muddy ground causes clothing and equipment to become wet, damp and dirty. Muddy conditions greatly inhibited Napoleon's ability to maneuver in Russia in the autumn of 1812 and also the German attempt to take Moscow in the autumn of 1941.

The 1942 Taschenbuch für den Winterkrieg acknowledges that neither tracked nor wheeled vehicles can maneuver during conditions of thaw and that aircraft operations must be constrained to concrete runways. It addresses minimizing the use of roads during this period and dismantling bridges that are likely to be taken out by ice floes. It emphasizes how positions in frozen soil must be improved to avoid deterioration from thaw and the necessity of changing uniforms from ones for cold to those for wet conditions.

=== Tactics ===
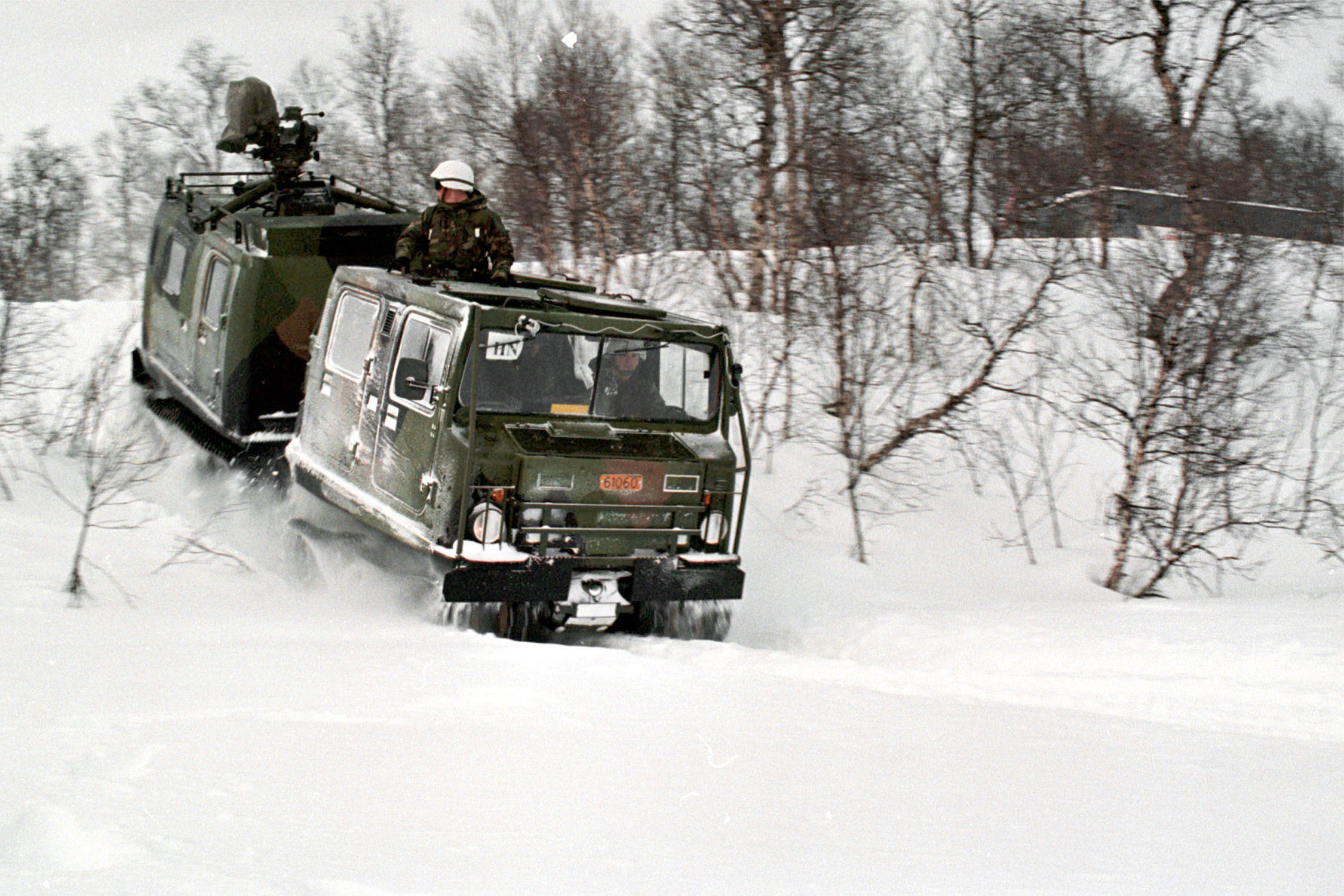
A Swedish Bandvagn 206 small unit support vehicle in Norwegian service being operated by U.S. Marines

The dominant tactical concern in cold conditions is the ability to maneuver in vehicles or on foot. Additionally, during winter, night operations become the norm at higher latitudes with their long periods of darkness. Snow enhances night vision because of high reflectivity and the visibility of combatants against the white background.

==== Mounted movement ====
The German Taschenbuch für den Winterkrieg emphasizes reconnaissance to ascertain the conditions and capacity of the roads to be used. It describes snow clearing from roads and recovery of bogged-down vehicles.

Soviet Army doctrine emphasized the use of sleds for transporting machine guns and mortars over snow, towed in a train by tracked tractors. It addressed the need to pre-heat tanks for use in winter and their application in advance of marching troops to take out enemy positions.

Finnish military doctrine calls for small-unit movements with anti-tank guided missiles and multiple launch rocket systems to attack foreign forces that have entered the country.

U.S. Army guidance advocates that over snow-covered terrain, vehicles may be employed to establish and maintain trails by establishing a well concealed track with the first vehicle, followed by a vehicle traveling offset from the track of the first, to flatten the trail, and subsequent vehicles widening and flattening the trail. Marked trails avoid obliteration in snowstorms or drifting conditions. In mountainous terrain, tracked vehicles, including tanks, infantry fighting vehicles, and cavalry fighting vehicles, rarely accompany dismounted infantry in the assault. Instead, they assist forces by occupying positions where they can use their firepower to isolate enemy objectives.

==== Dismounted movement ====
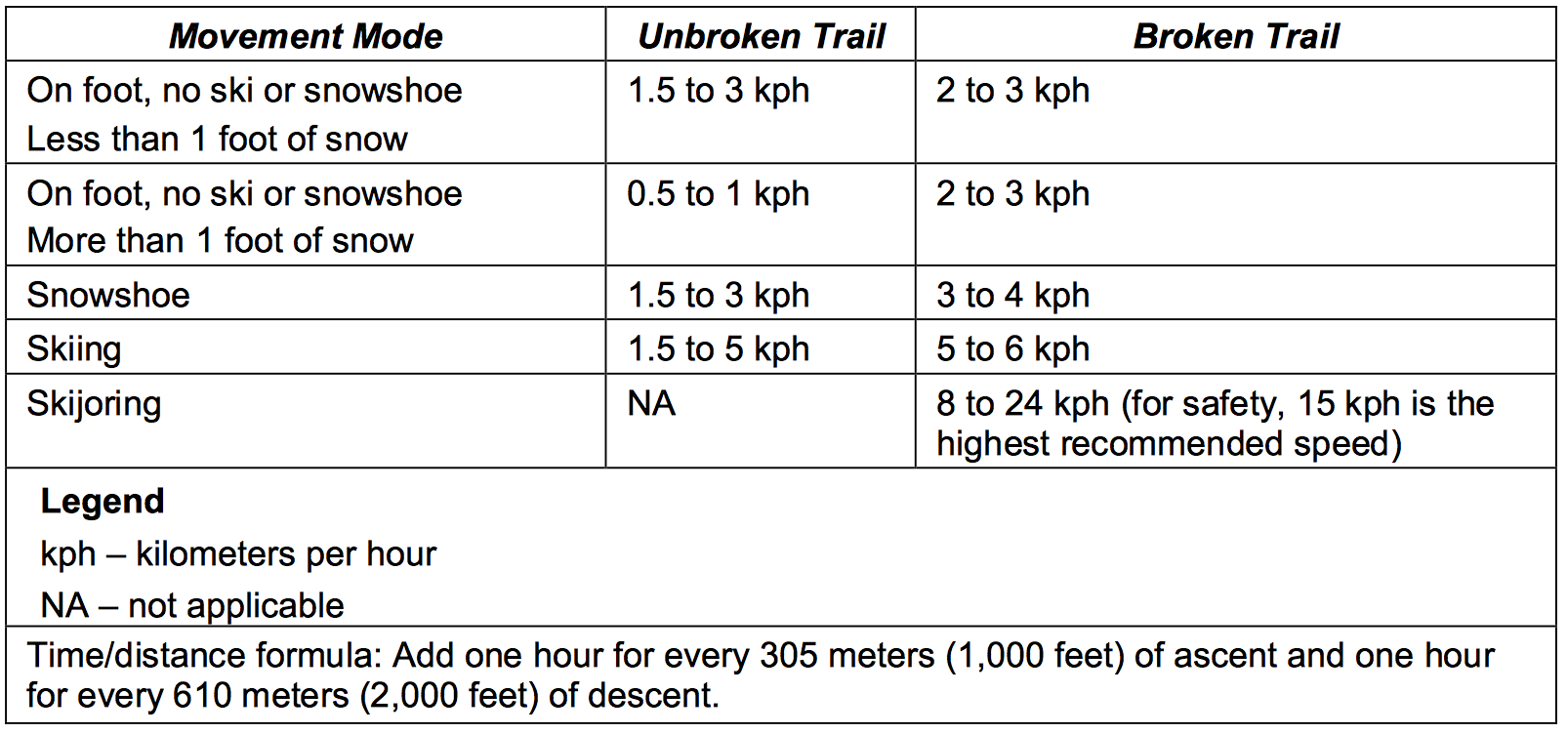
Rates of march for unit movement in snow

The German Taschenbuch describes preparation and conduct of marches and advocates maintaining slow, steady progress with brief stops to avoid exposure to the wind, and the provision of warm beverages by support vehicles along the way.

Soviet Army doctrine emphasized the use of ski troops for dismounted operations over snow.

U.S. Army guidance explains that troops moving in a wedge-like "column" formation travel more slowly, with no one breaking the trail in undisturbed snow, than the in-line file formation. Therefore, column formation is reserved for imminent enemy contact. As slope angle increases, the amount of travel time is likely to increase substantially.

==== Water crossings ====
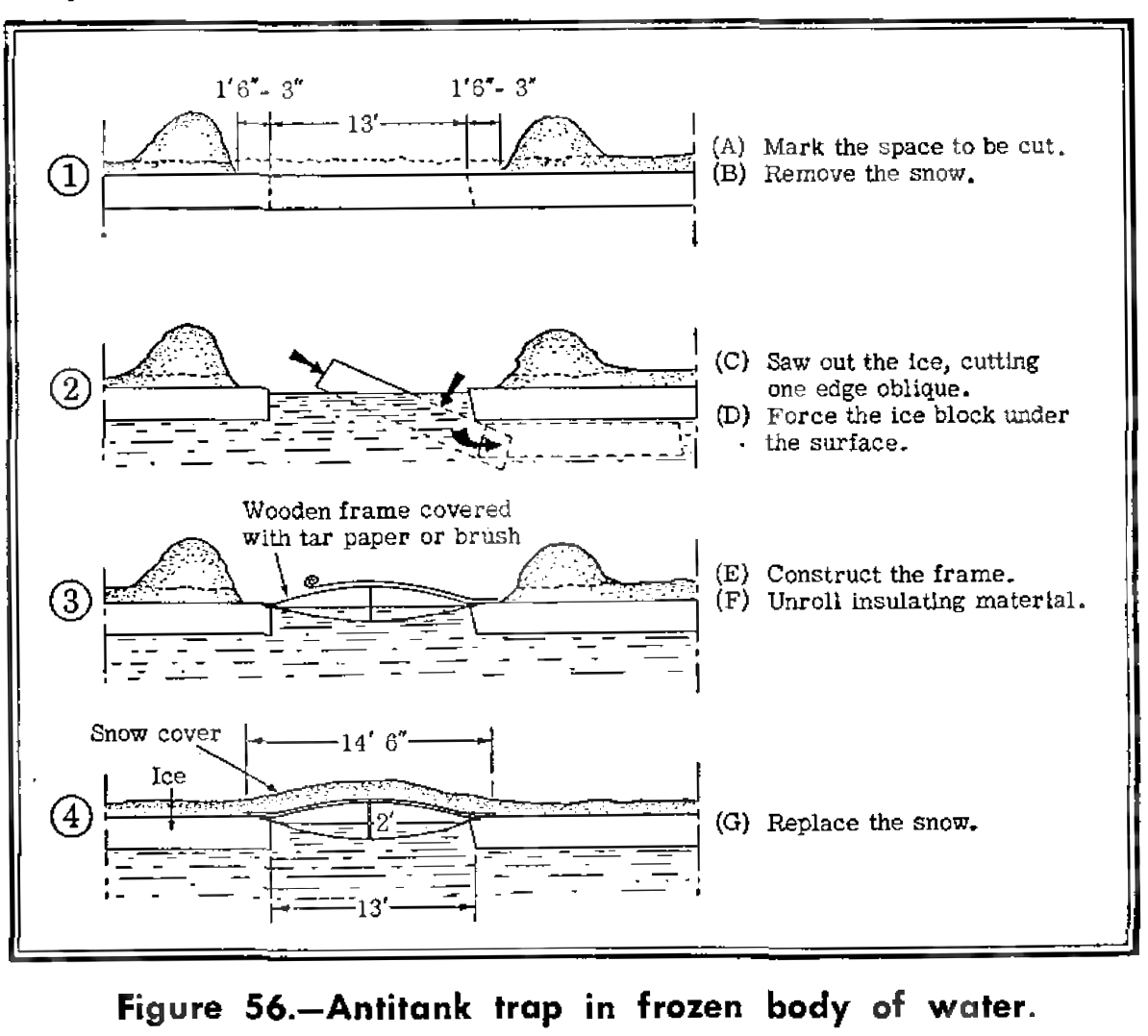
Diagram for creating a tank trap on ice, adapted from the Taschenbuch für den Winterkrieg

The German Taschenbuch describes the assessment and reinforcement of ice crossings and also the opportunity to use them as tank traps by removing the ice and bridging the gap with a weak structure, disguised as reinforced ice. It offers the following guidance for crossing ice sheets:

| Ice thickness cm (in) | Type of military traffic | Minimum interval m (ft) |
|---|---|---|
| 5 (2) | Infantry in file with double intervals | 7 (23) |
| 20 (8) | Vehicles with gross weight of 4.5 tonnes (5 short tons) | 20 (66) |
| 30 (12) | Vehicles with gross weight of 8.2 tonnes (9 short tons) | 30 (98) |
| 40 (16) | 18-tonne (20-short-ton) vehicles, light tanks | 40 (131) |
| 60 (24) | 41-tonne (45-short-ton) vehicles | 50 (164) |

The Soviet Army was an early adopter of a protocol for winter warfare. Its doctrine described the assessment and reinforcement of ice crossings and suggested the use of frozen lakes and rivers as expeditionary airfields, located close to the front to take advantage of short daylight hours in winter.

According to the U.S. Army, rivers found in cold regions may be major obstacles. Subarctic rivers usually have many braided channels and swift currents. During spring and early winter, rivers may become impassable due to freezing or thawing ice flows. Once firmly frozen, rivers may offer routes for both mounted and dismounted movement. Some swampy areas do not freeze solidly during the coldest periods of winter to support troop movements. Nonetheless, it is possible to construct "ice bridges" to thicken an iced-over waterway, using pumps or some other means of flooding the ice-covered area, when temperatures are below −12 °C (10 °F) and the pre-existing natural ice is thicker than 10 centimetres (3.9 in) to support the construction activity.

=== Snow camouflage ===
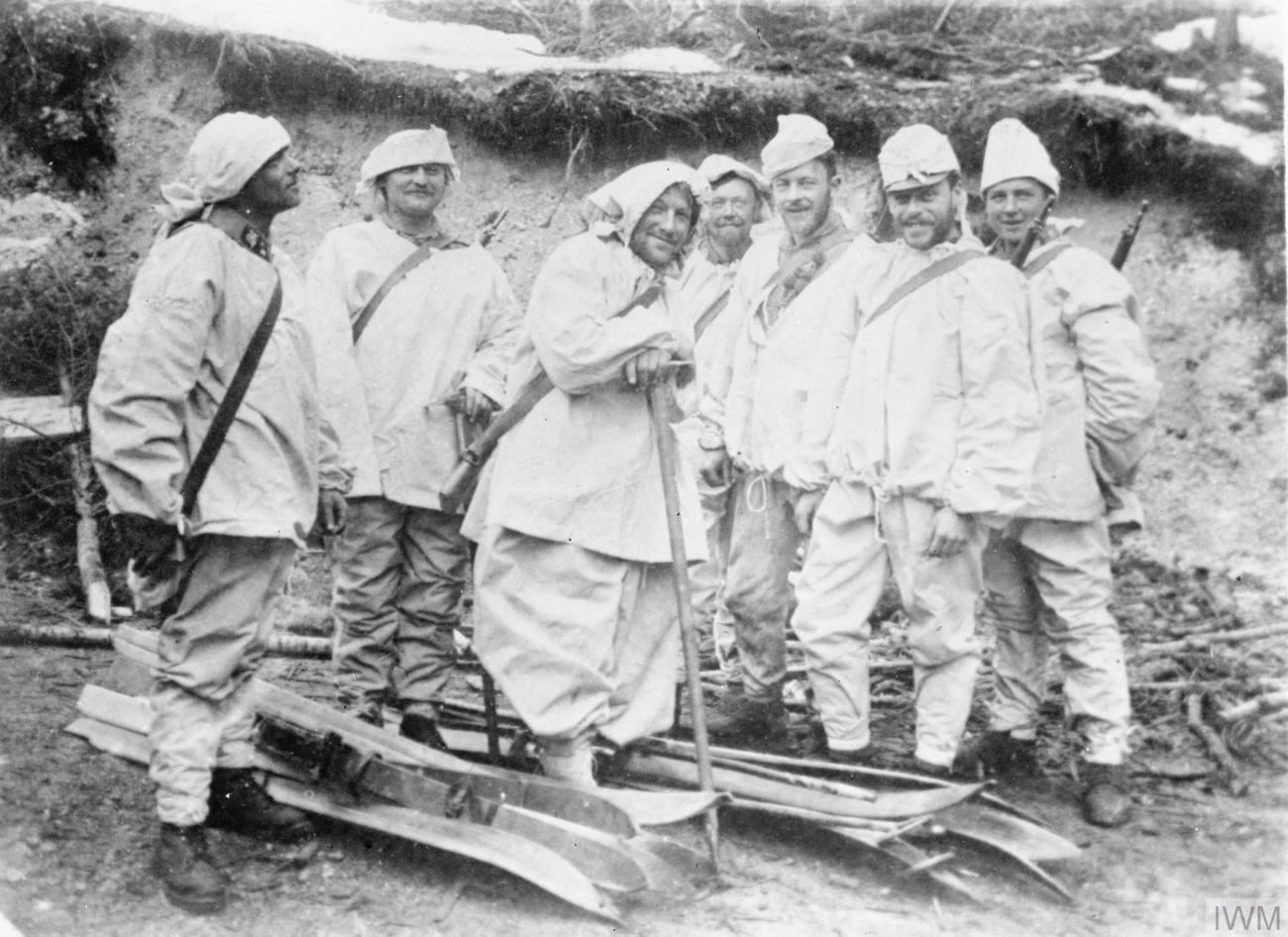
Austro-Hungarian ski patrol on Italian Front in snow camouflage, 1915–1918

Armies have made use of improvised and official snow camouflage uniforms and equipment since the First World War, such as in the fighting in the Dolomite Mountains between Austria-Hungary and Italy. Snow camouflage was used far more widely in the Second World War by the Wehrmacht, the Finnish Army, the Soviet Army and others. Since then, snow variants of disruptively patterned camouflage for uniforms have been introduced, sometimes with digital patterns. For example, the Bundeswehr has a Schneetarn (snow) variant of its widely used Flecktarn pattern.

Soviet Army doctrine emphasized the importance of camouflage over positions and the need to remove telltale signs of artillery actions, such as smoke stains or shell casings. It also cited the usefulness of decoy targets. It describes the establishment of breastworks made from snow 2 to 3 metres (7 to 10 ft) thick, ice 1.5 metres (5 ft) thick or soil and wood 0.9 metres (3 ft) thick.

=== Materiel ===
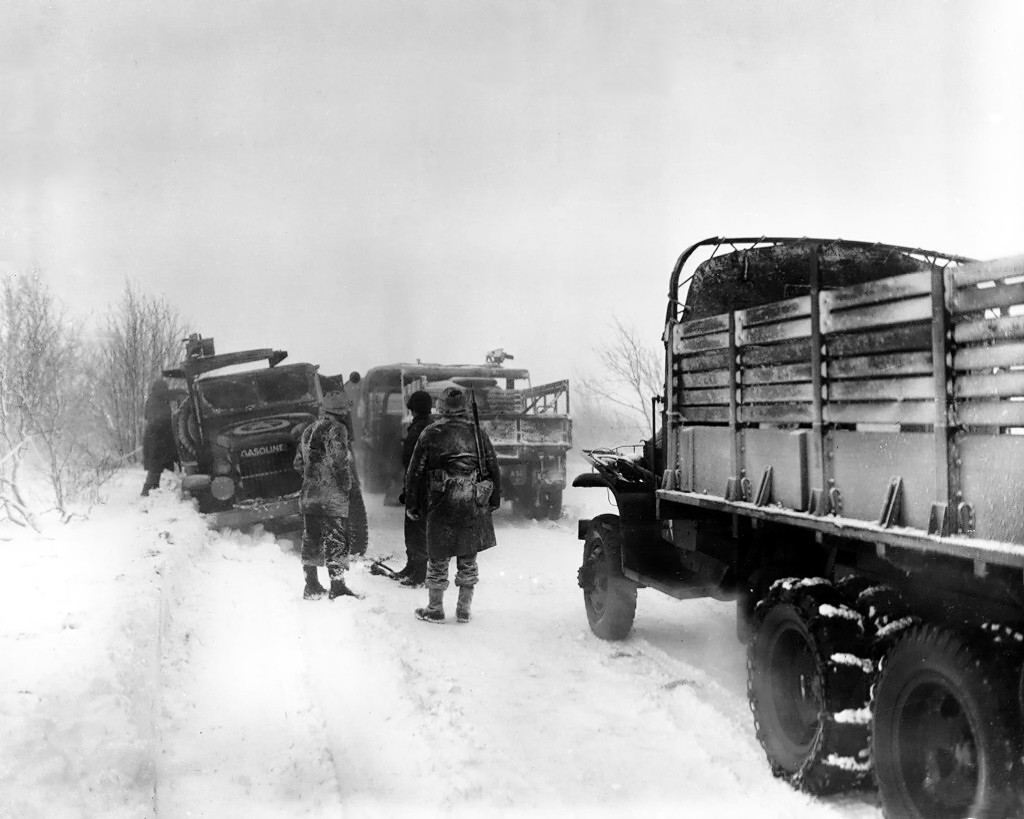
U.S. Army transport vehicles during the Battle of the Bulge

Snow, ice and cold temperatures affect munitions and military vehicles.

Munitions – Snow, ice, frozen ground, and low temperatures affect mine-laying operations. Burying mines in a frost layer may be difficult, requiring mines to be placed on top of the ground and then camouflaged. Snow or ice may prevent detonation, owing to freezing the firing device or isolating from pressure above. This can be mitigated with plastic laid over the top of the mine.

Vehicles – Adaptations of military vehicles to winter operations include tire chains for maintaining traction of wheeled vehicles. Diesel engines start less well in cold and may require pre-heating or idling during cold periods. A variety of military vehicles have been developed for over-snow travel, including the Sisu Nasu, BvS 10, and M29 Weasel.

=== Military engineering ===
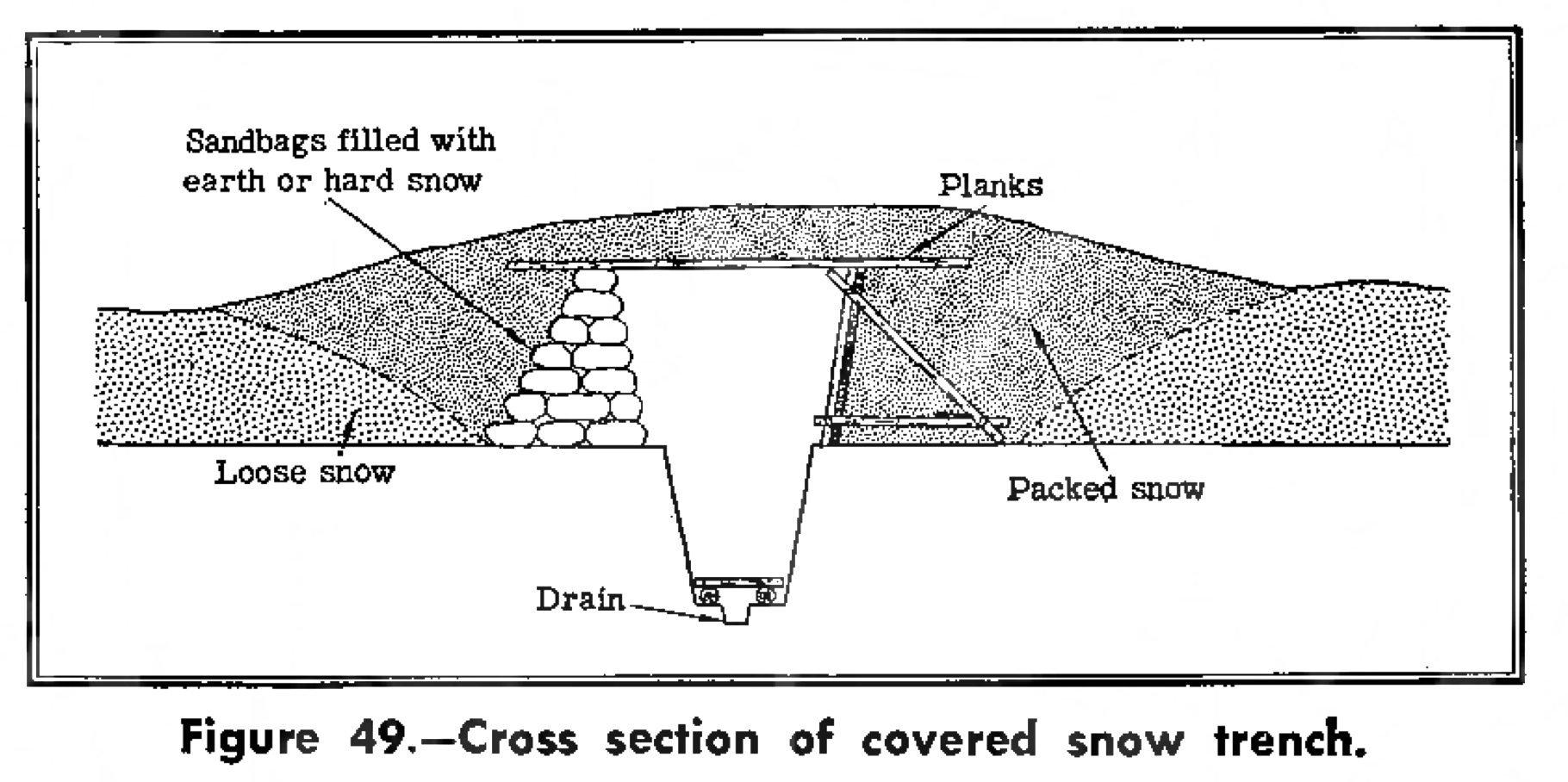
Cross section of a snow-covered trench for troop emplacement, adapted from the 1942 German Taschenbuch für den Winterkrieg

Military engineers design and construct transportation and troop-support facilities. In cold climates frozen ground can make digging difficult. Soviet Army doctrine gave them the responsibility to establish build and maintain routes, including water crossings, build and destroy obstacles that require special equipment, construct and maintain airfields, and to build shelter for personnel. Operations that didn't require special equipment were left to other troops. The Taschenbuch describes a variety of ways to employ local resources to create roads, shelters and fortifications.

Engineers provide roadways, landing zones, shelter, water supply and wastewater disposal, and electrical power to encampments. Roadway and landing zones require heavy equipment, which is more fatiguing to operate in the cold and necessary to protect from freezing. Snowstorms require cleanup and spring thaw requires management of thawed soil. Landing zones require stabilization of dust and snow to avoid blinding helicopter pilots. The U.S. Army has cold-weather adaptive kits for providing water and electrical utilities. The tactical engineer has limited options for providing a water supply; they are in order of ease of provision: drawing water from rivers or lakes, melting ice or snow, or drilling wells.

Water supply and treatment is especially challenging in the cold. U.S. Army tactical water purification systems require a winter kit operate between 32 and −25 °F (0 and −32 °C). Water storage may require heating. Water source exploitation may require augering through ice, if shaped charges are not available. The water distribution system can be subject to freezing and clogging from frazil ice. Where chemical treatment is used, it takes longer to dissolve in the treated water.

=== Medicine ===
Three types of cold injury can occur in the theater, hypothermia, trench foot, and frostbite in ascending amount of exposure to cold temperatures.

==== Hypothermia ====
Hypothermia occurs when the body core temperature drops below 35 °C (95 °F). Symptoms depend on the temperature and range from shivering and mental confusion to increased risk of the heart stopping. The treatment of mild hypothermia involves warm drinks, warm clothing and physical activity. In those with moderate hypothermia heating blankets and warmed intravenous fluids are recommended. People with moderate or severe hypothermia should be moved gently. In severe hypothermia extracorporeal membrane oxygenation (ECMO) or cardiopulmonary bypass may be useful. In those without a pulse cardiopulmonary resuscitation (CPR) is indicated along with the above measures. Rewarming is typically continued until a person's temperature is greater than 32 °C (90 °F). Adequate insulation from clothing is the best way to avoid hypothermia in the field.

==== Trench foot ====
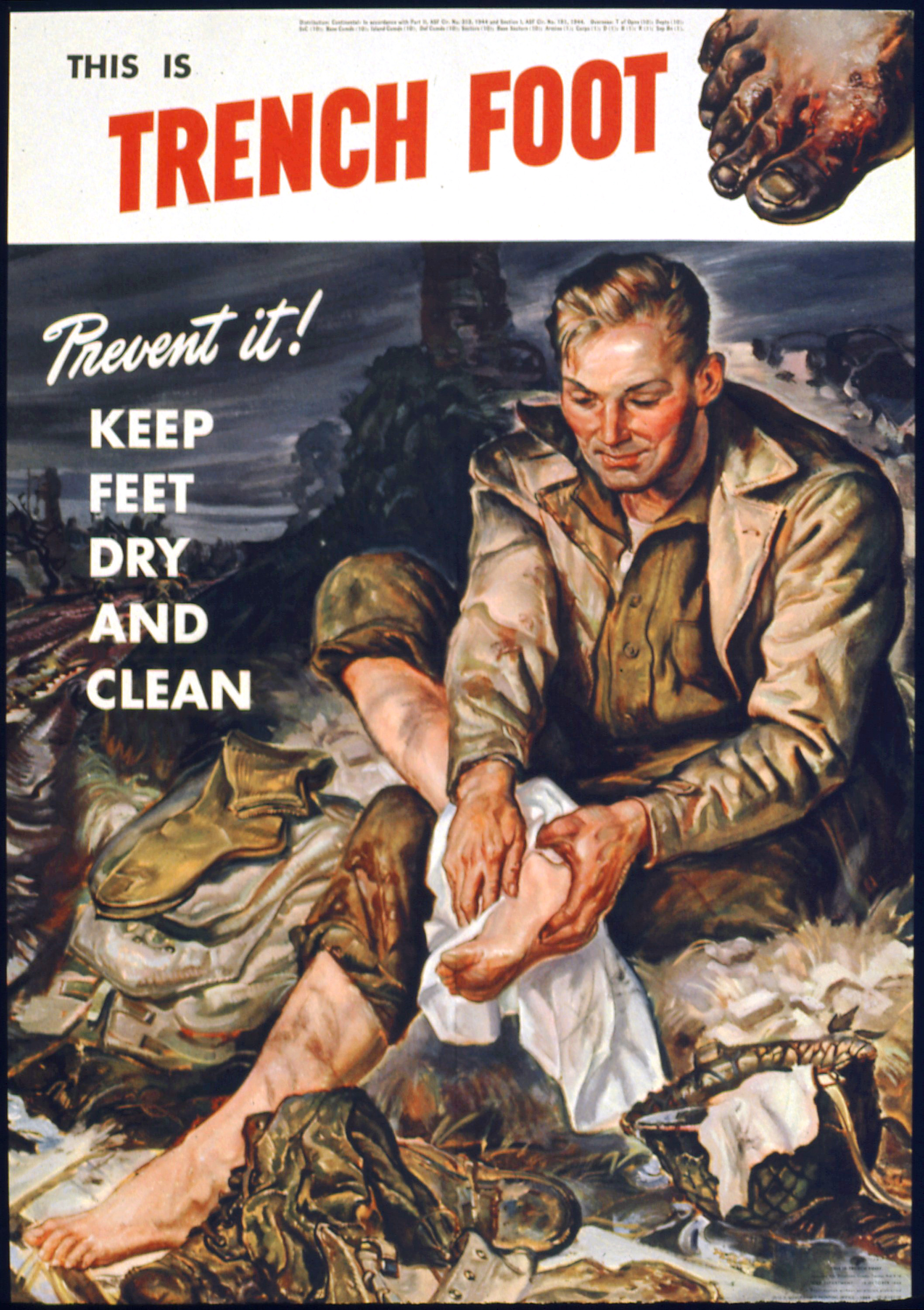
Military poster on preventing trench foot

Trench foot is a medical condition caused by prolonged exposure of the feet to damp, unsanitary, and cold conditions at temperatures as warm as 16 °C (61 °F) for as few as 13 hours. Exposure to these environmental conditions causes deterioration and destruction of the capillaries and leads to morbidity of the surrounding flesh. Affected feet may become numb, affected by erythema (turning red) or cyanosis (turning blue) as a result of poor blood supply, and may begin emanating a decaying odour if the early stages of necrosis (tissue death) set in. As the condition worsens, feet may also begin to swell. Advanced trench foot often involves blisters and open sores, which lead to fungal infections. If left untreated, trench foot usually results in gangrene, which may require amputation. If trench foot is treated properly, complete recovery is normal, though it is marked by severe short-term pain when feeling returns. Trench foot affected tens of thousands of soldiers engaged in trench warfare in World War I. Keeping feet warm and dry, or at least changing into warm and dry replacement footgear, is the best way to avoid trench foot.

==== Frostbite ====
Frostbite is localized damage to skin and other tissues due to freezing. At or below 0 °C (32 °F), blood vessels close to the skin start to constrict, and blood is shunted away from the extremities. The same response may also be a result of exposure to high winds. This constriction helps to preserve core body temperature. In extreme cold, or when the body is exposed to cold for long periods, this protective strategy can reduce blood flow in some areas of the body to dangerously low levels. This lack of blood leads to the eventual freezing and death of skin tissue in the affected areas. Frostbite was responsible for over one million casualties in wars in the 20th century. Adequate insulation from clothing is the best way to avoid hypothermia in the field.

== Training by nation ==
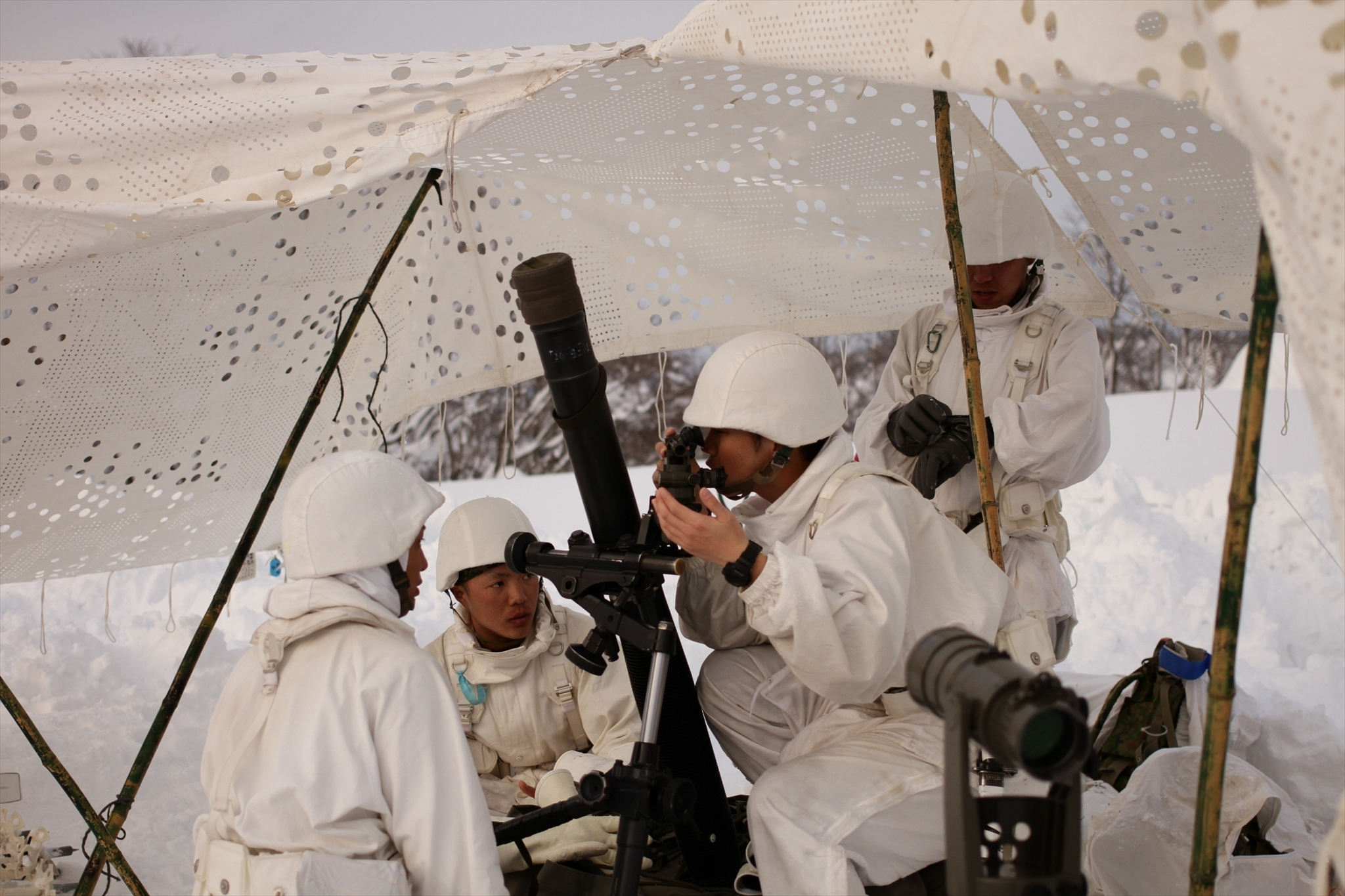
Unit of the Japan Ground Self-Defense Force training with an 81 mm mortar

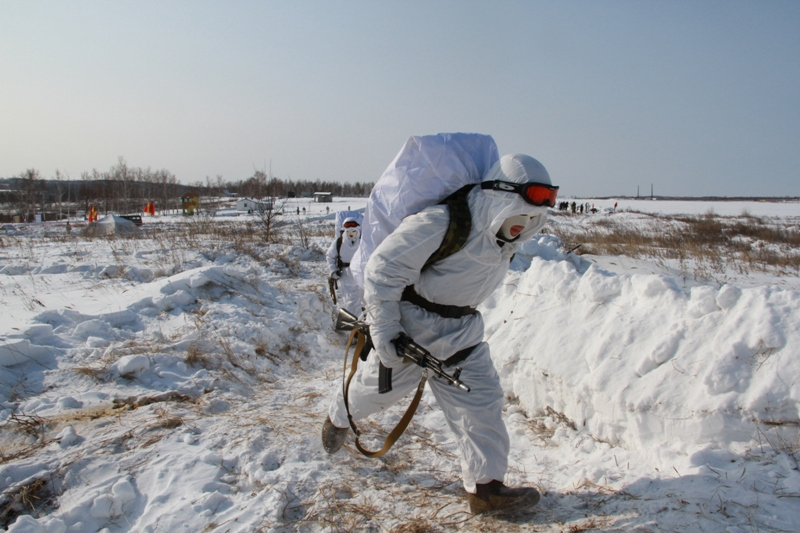
Russian cadets training for Arctic conditions

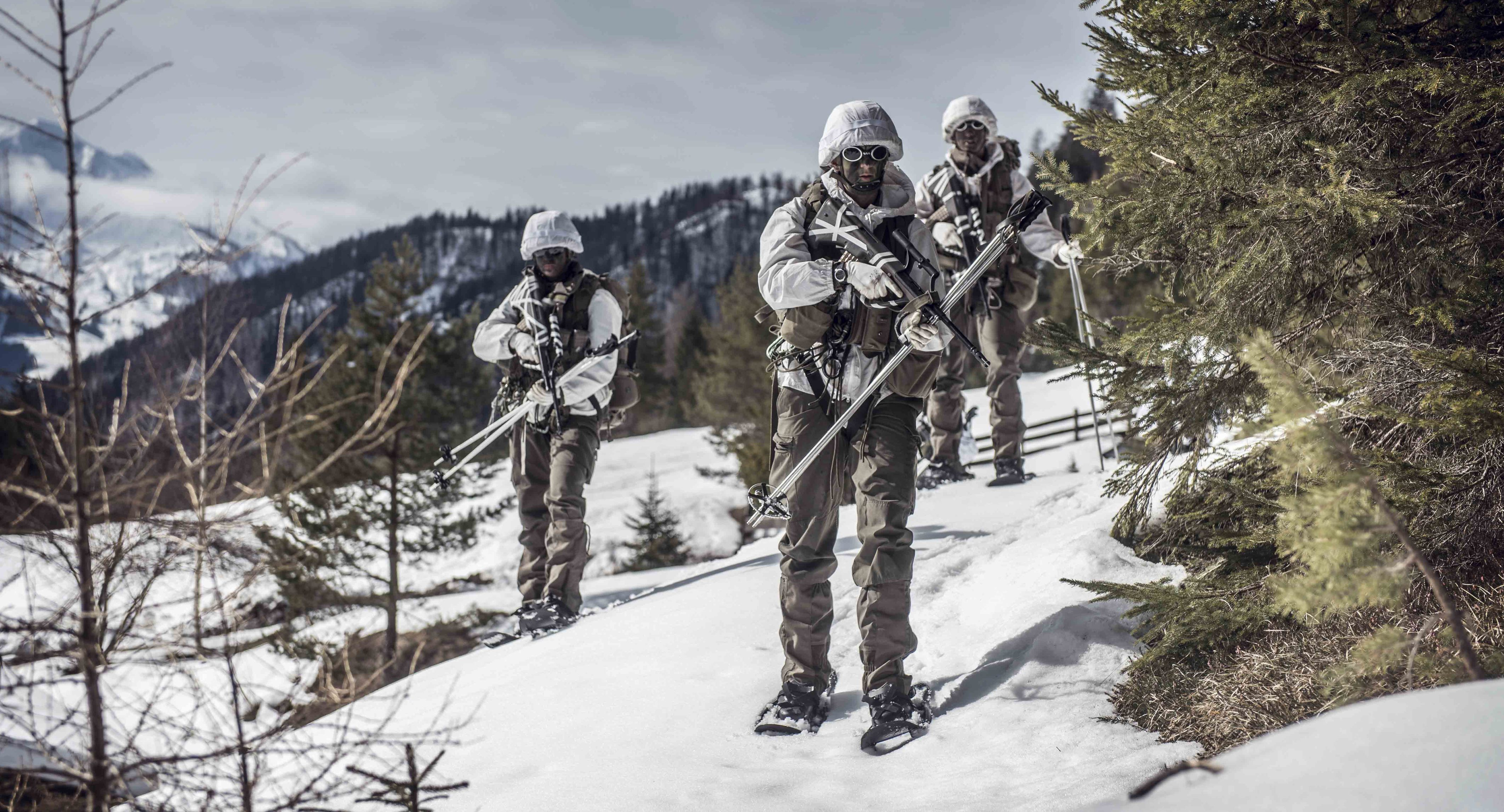
Austrian mountain troops on snowshoes

The following nations report regular training programs in cold-weather warfare:

- Canada – In 2008, the Canadian Forces established the Nanisivik Naval Facility, a winter warfare training center above the arctic circle in Resolute, Nunavut for annual exercises.
- China – The People's Liberation Army trains annually in regions subject to harsh winter conditions. Lightly armed border patrol units are mounted on horseback or snowmobiles and are expected to provide early detection of incursion.
- Finland – The Finnish Defence Forces train every conscript for skiing and Arctic warfare regardless of the branch, approximately 25,000 soldiers per year. Finland also trains U.S. Army students in Arctic warfare.
- Germany – The Bundeswehr maintains its mountain troops in Bavaria. After the 2001 disbandment of the 1st Mountain Division, mountain troops were reorganized as the Gebirgsjägerbrigade 23 with a strength of 5,000 Troops.
- India – The Indian Army trains 100 officers and 400 non-commissioned officers and junior commissioned officers annually, at its High Altitude Warfare School. Its graduates are assigned to the Siachen Glacier border garrison.
- Iran – Members of the 65th Airborne Special Forces Brigade train for warfare on snow at their winter camp in Emamzadeh Hashem, Iran.
- Italy - The Alpini are the Italian Army's specialist mountain infantry. Established in 1872, they are the oldest active mountain infantry in the world.
- Japan – In the Japan Ground Self-Defense Force, the Cold Weather Combat Training Unit (冬季戦技教育隊, Tōki Sengi Kyōiku-tai) is mandated for research and training for cold-weather warfare. The Winter Ranger Course (冬季遊撃課程, Tōki-Yūgeki-katei), the advanced post-graduate ranger training for cold-weather warfare, is established by this unit.
- Norway – Hosts an annual, multi-national winter exercise Cold Response course. In 2016, the participants came from Belgium, Canada, Denmark, Finland, Germany, Latvia, the Netherlands, Poland, Spain, Sweden, the United States, the United Kingdom and Norway.
- Russian Federation – Russia trains combined forces in winter annually. In 2013, it held four winter readiness exercises under shorter-than-usual notice, according to Wilk: A February exercise with seven thousand soldiers, several hundred fighting vehicles and 48 aircraft and helicopters and three March exercises, one using seven thousand soldiers, 250 fighting vehicles, 50 artillery units, 20 aircraft and helicopters as well as 36 warships. Training occurs at the Far Eastern Higher Combined Arms Command School in Blagoveshchensk in the Amur Oblast of eastern Russia. The school covers mountain and Arctic warfare and qualifies officers as "Commanders of Motorized Rifle Platoons (Arctic)".
- Sweden - Since 1999 Sweden has operated the Swedish Armed Forced Winter Unit as a part of the Norrbotten Regiment in northern Sweden. The unit acts as the Swedish centre of knowledge regarding arctic warfare and is responsible for the development and training of arctic warfare doctrine. In 2024, an officer of the unit (Fredrik Flink) was awarded the Defense Meritorious Service Medal from the United States Special Operations Command for his role in training and developing arctic warfare doctrine for the 10th Special Forces Group.
- United Kingdom – Royal Navy sailors and Royal Marines train in Norway above the Arctic Circle. The Royal Marines Mountain Leader Training Cadre is the UK premier cold-weather troop detachment.
- United States – The U.S. military maintains cold-weather and mountain warfare training centers at the Army Northern Warfare Training Center at Fort Wainwright, Fairbanks, Alaska, the Army Mountain Warfare School at Camp Ethan Allen, Jericho, Vermont, the Special Forces Command Mountaineering Warfare Training Detachment at Fort Carson, Colorado Springs, Colorado, the U.S. Air Force Arctic Survival School at Eielson AFB, Alaska, and the Marine Corps Mountain Warfare Training Center, in Bridgeport, California.

Equipment used in cold-weather training exercises

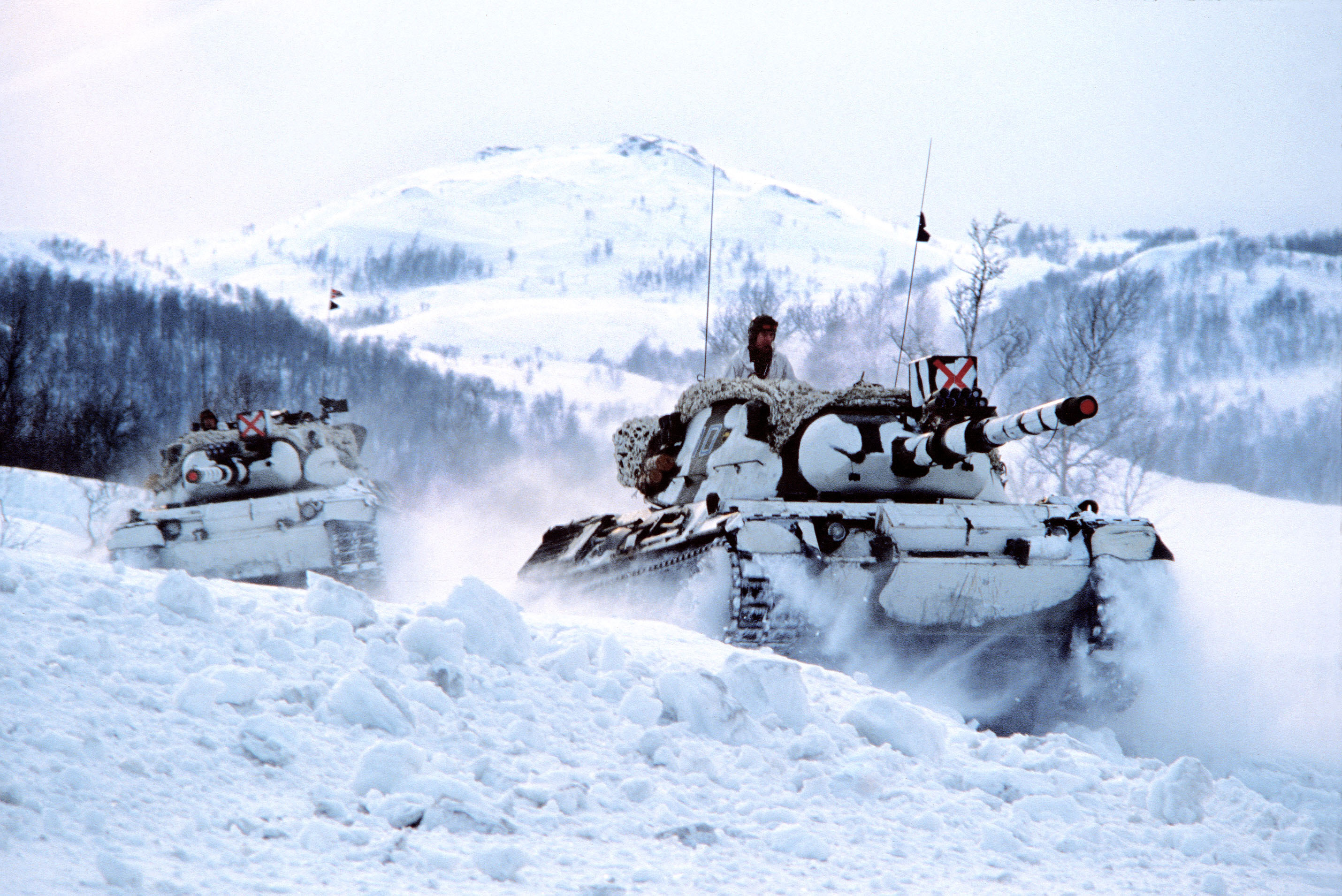
Norwegian Leopard 1A1 tanks participating in a 1982 NATO exercise.

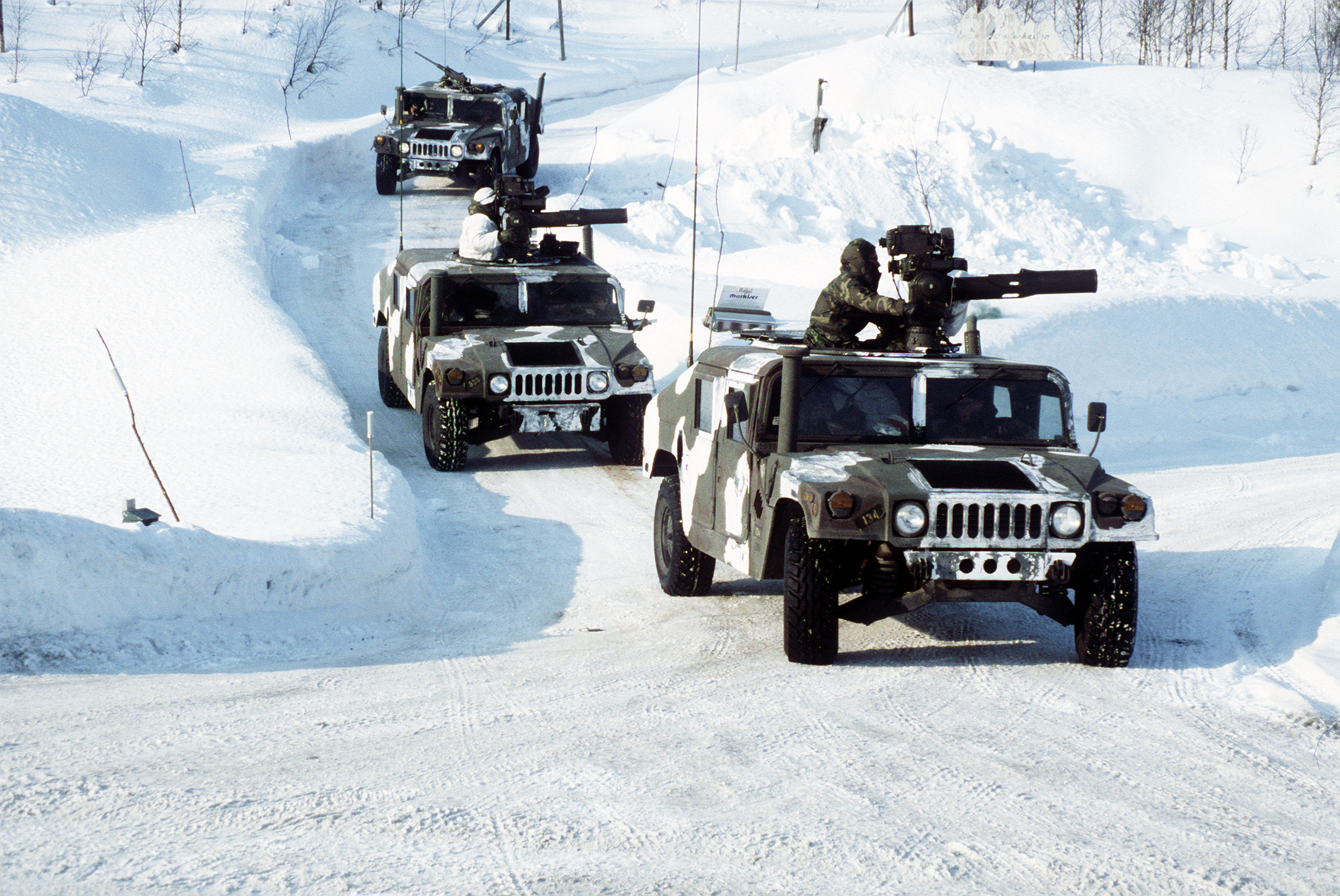
Humvees with BGM-71 TOW anti-tank weapons systems in Norway during Operation Cold Winter '87.

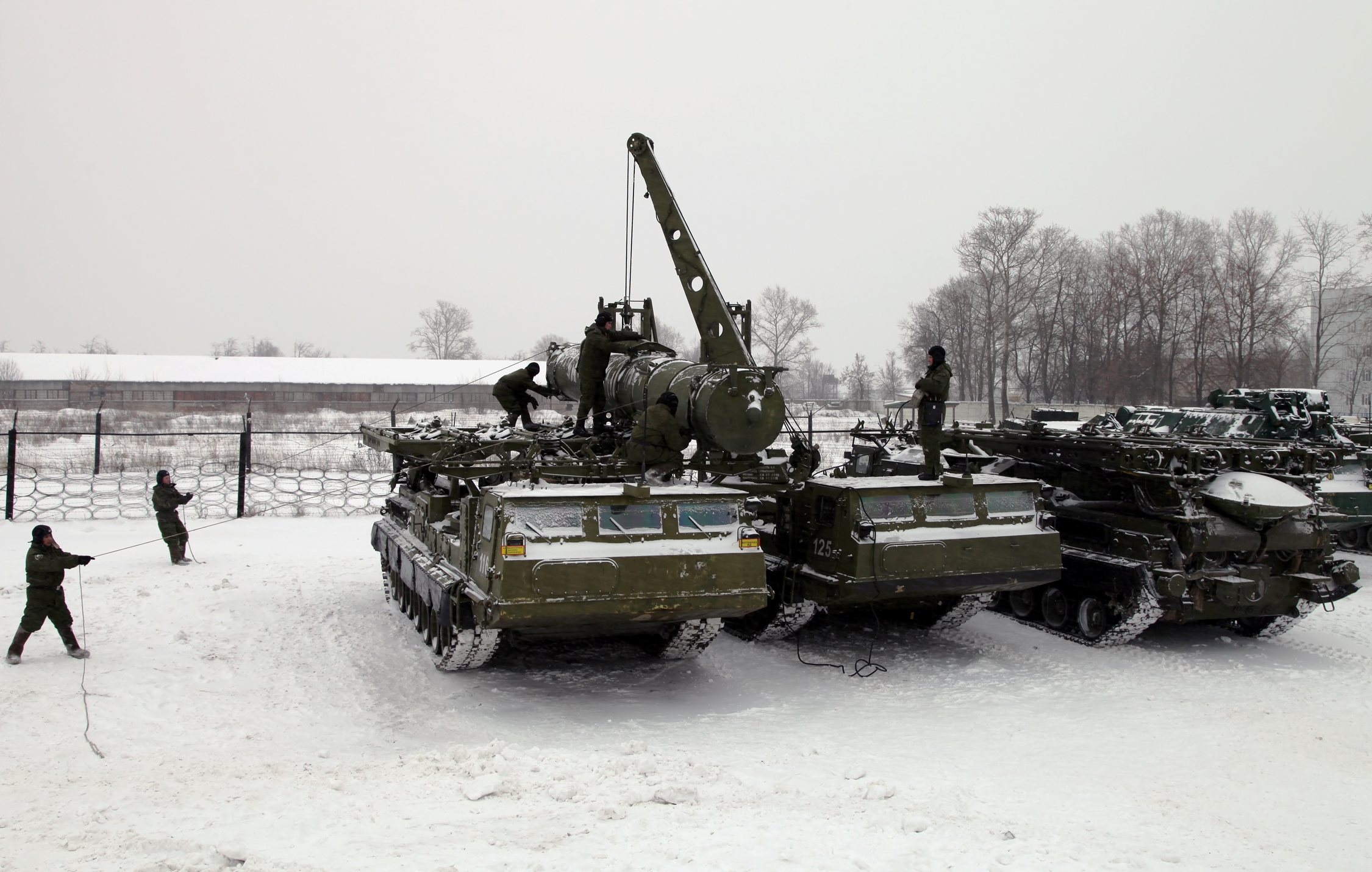
The 202nd Air Defence Brigade in the Western Military District in Russia loading S-300V surface-to-air missiles (SAMs) in 2012.

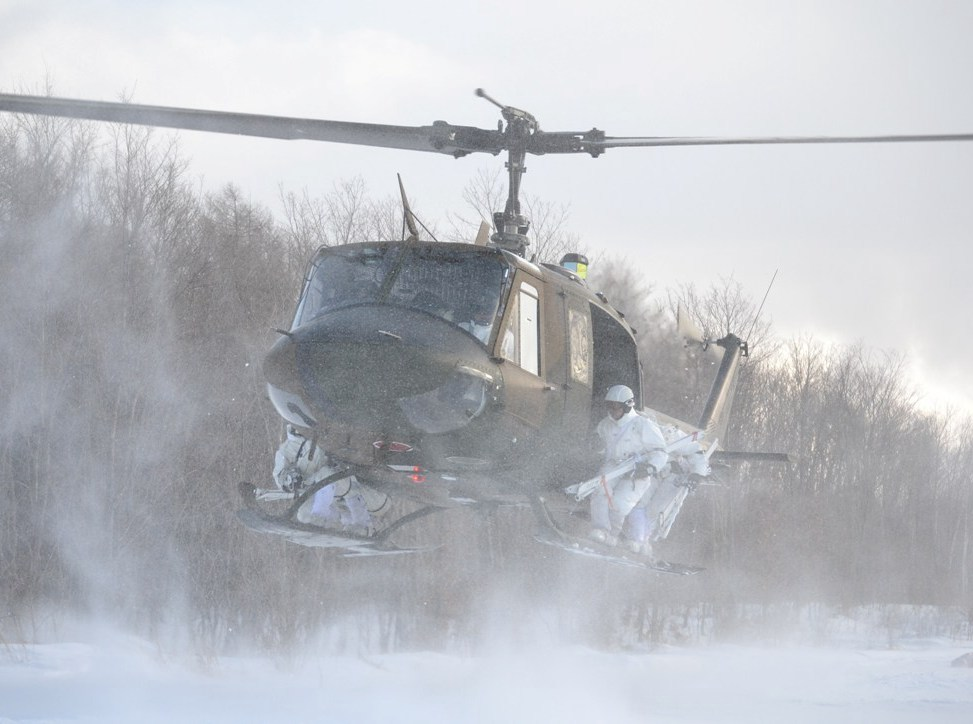
Air assault by Japanese ski troops in winter camouflage

== Naval operations ==
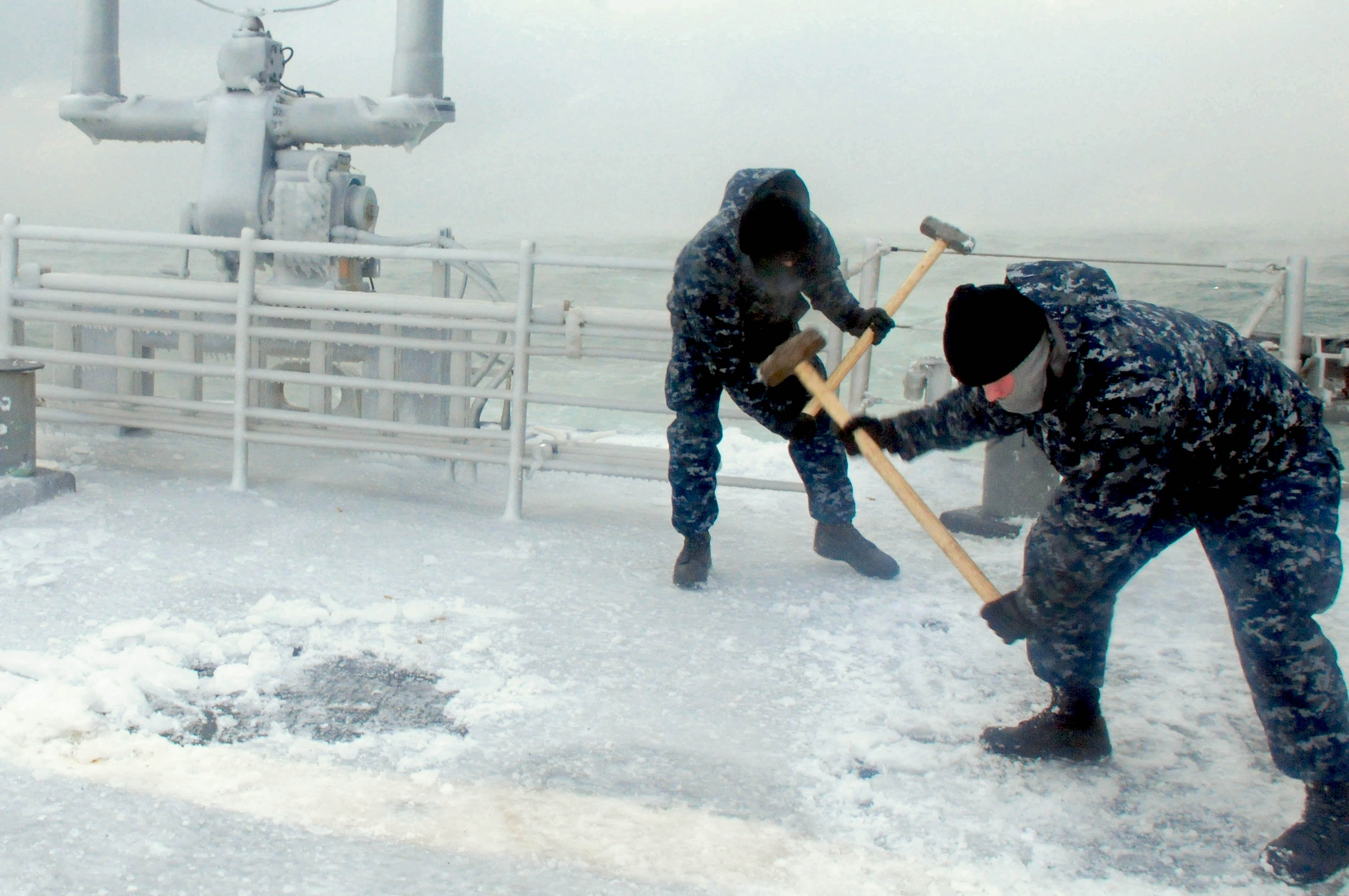
American sailors clearing ice from ship topsides

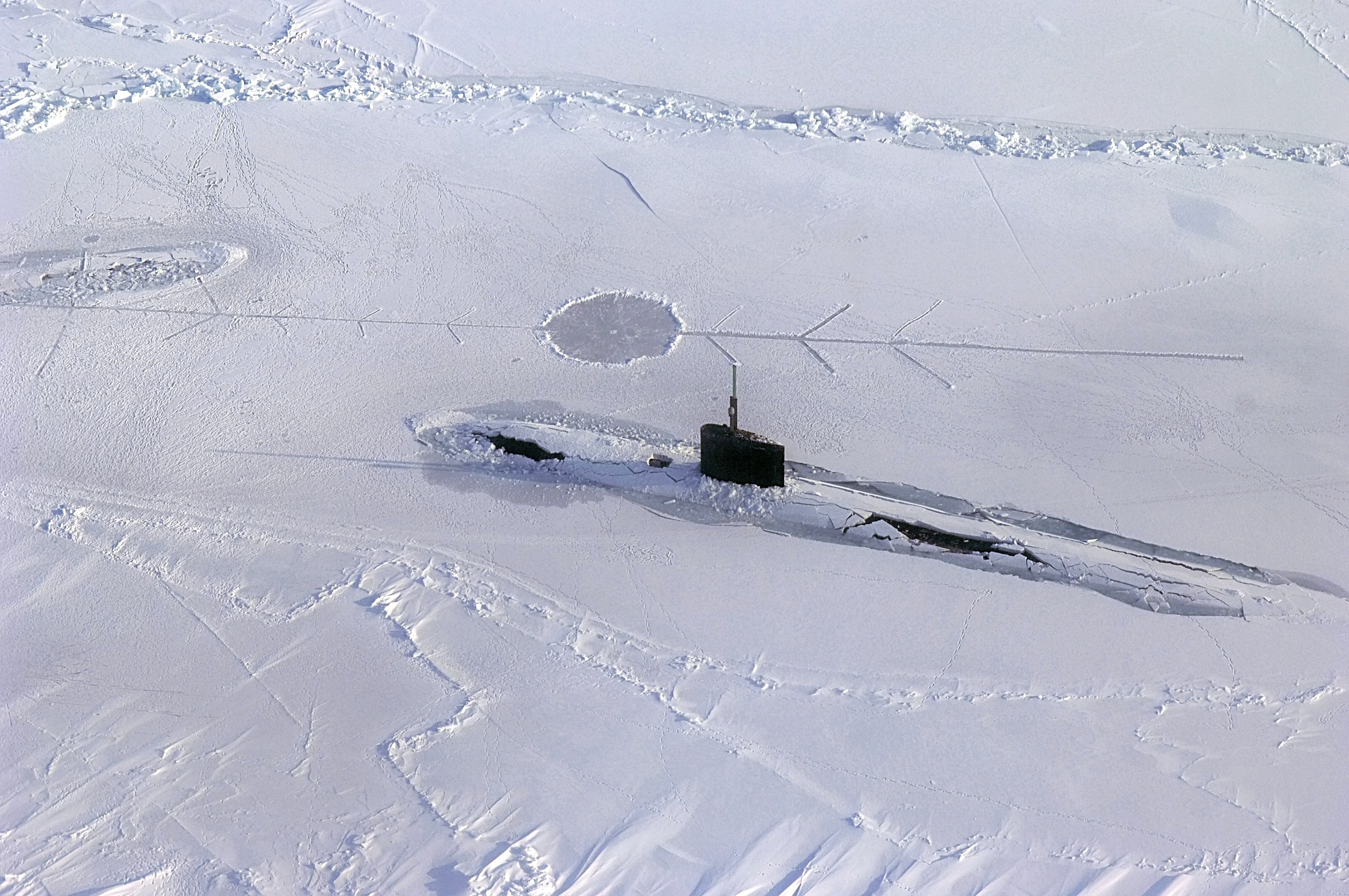
Los Angeles-class fast attack submarine USS Alexandria (SSN 757) surfacing through two feet (0.6 m) of Arctic ice

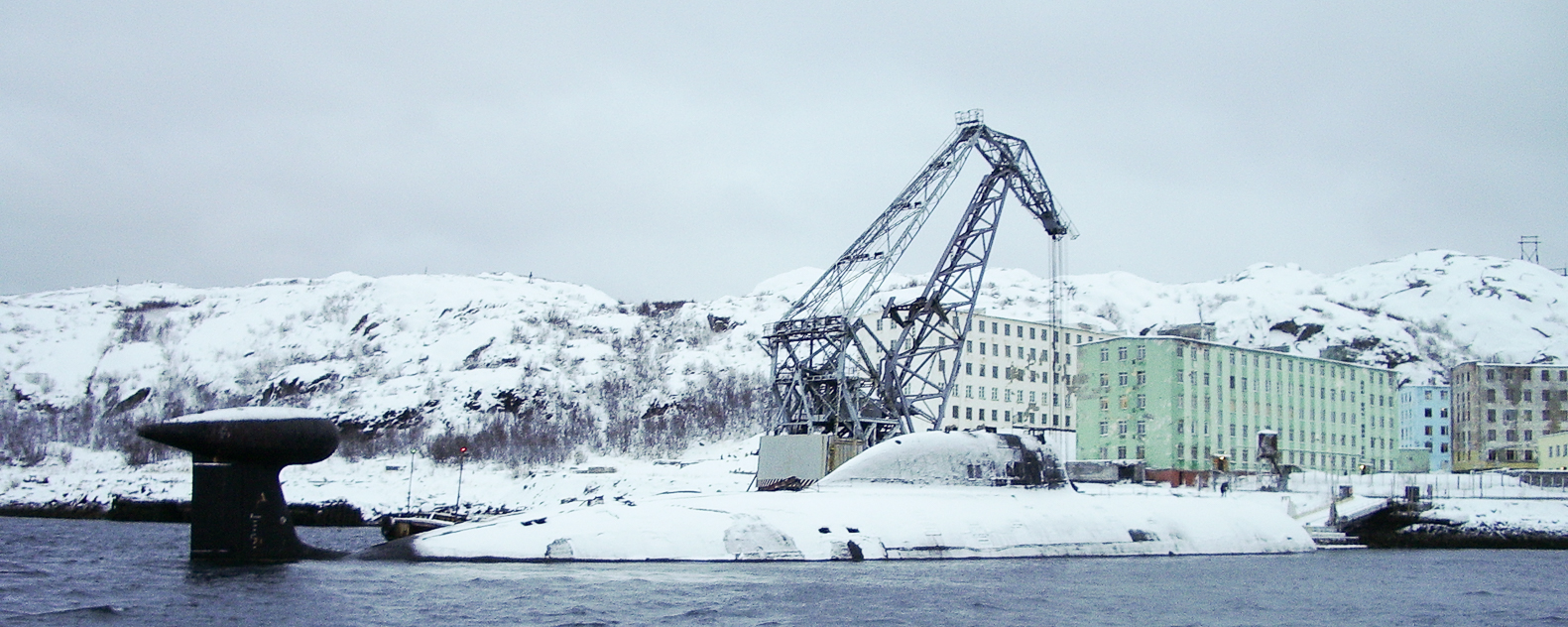
Russian Akula-class submarine of the Northern Fleet submarine base at Gadzhiyevo in the Murmansk Oblast

Subfreezing conditions have significant implications for naval operations. The 1988 U.S. Navy Cold Weather Handbook for Surface Ships outlines effects on: icing on the topsides of ships, ship systems, underway replenishment, flight operations, and personnel. It also discusses preparations for cold-weather fleet operations.

=== Topside icing on ships ===
Topside icing is a serious hazard to ships operating in sub-freezing temperatures. Thick layers of ice can form on decks, sides, superstructures, deck mounted machinery, antennas and combat systems. The presence of topside ice has many adverse effects, principally it:

- Increases ship displacement
- Decreases freeboard
- Impairs operation of deck machinery
- Impedes personnel movement on deck
- Restricts helicopter operations
- Disrupts operation of radio and radars

=== Combat systems degradation ===
Icing may prevent a warship from conducting any type of offensive operations, including restraining the doors of a vertical launch systems, binding gears, shafts, hinges and pedestals. Other effects include sluggish performance of lubricants, increased failure rate of seals, plugs and O-rings, frozen magazine sprinkler systems, excessively long warm-up times for electronics or weapon system electronics, and freeze up of compressed-air-operated components.

=== Arctic operations ===
Global climate change has opened the waters of the Arctic along the northern shores of Alaska, Russia and Canada. The region is rich in natural resources. Countries abutting the Arctic Ocean have shown greater military patrol activity. The Military Times reported in 2015 that Russia had reactivated ten military bases, had increased surface ship and aircraft patrols of its Northern Fleet, and had conducted missile tests in the region. The U.S. Navy plans to have sufficient assets by 2030 to respond militarily in the Arctic. As of 2015, it conducted regular submarine patrols, but few air or surface ship operations. Russia had twelve ice breakers versus two for the U.S. As of 2013, Canada had six ice breakers. In 2016, Canada announced the building of five ice-breaking Arctic and offshore patrol ships.

== See also ==
Warfare

- Desert warfare
- Jungle Warfare
- Mountain warfare
- Tunnel Warfare
- Urban Warfare
- Russian Northern Fleet
- Ski warfare
- List of mountain warfare forces

Climate

- Russian Winter
- Annual Dry Season Offensive

Arctic

- ICEX: US Navy Mission in Arctic
- Arctic cooperation and politics
- Natural resources of the Arctic
