= Dano-Swedish War =

Dano-Swedish War may refer to:

- Dano-Swedish War (1470–1471), Danish invasion of Sweden by sea
- Dano-Swedish War (1501–1512), military conflict between Denmark and Sweden within the Kalmar Union
- Dano-Swedish War (1512–1520), Danish invasion of Sweden ending with Christian II of Denmark becoming king of Sweden
- Dano-Swedish War (1657–1658), conflict between Sweden and Denmark–Norway during the Second Northern War
- Dano-Swedish War (1658–1660), continuation of the 1657 conflict between Sweden and Denmark–Norway
- Dano-Swedish War (1808–1809), war between Denmark–Norway and Sweden during the Napoleonic Wars
- Dano-Swedish War (1813–1814), Swedish invasion and occupation of the Danish duchies of Schleswig and Holstein

== See also ==
- List of wars between Denmark and Sweden
