= List of mountain warfare forces =

Many countries around the world maintain military units that are specifically trained for ski and mountain troops tasks. The list does not include non-mountain special forces units, even if several of them have some mountain warfare capabilities.

== Abkhazia ==
- Mountain Rifle Battalion (Горнострелковый Батальон - Gornostrelkovyy Batal'on) (Note: De facto state with limited international recognition.)

== Argentina ==
- 5th Mountain Brigade "General Manuel Belgrano" (Brigada de Montaña V "General Manuel Belgrano")
  - 15th Mountain Infantry Regiment "General Francisco Ortiz de Ocampo" (Regimiento de Infantería de Montaña 15 "General Francisco Ortiz de Ocampo")
  - 20th Mountain Infantry Regiment "Andes Rifles" (Regimiento de Infantería de Montaña 20 "Cazadores de los Andes")
  - 5th Mountain Reconnaissance Cavalry Regiment "General Martín Miguel de Güemes" (Regimiento de Caballería de Exploración de Montaña 5 "General Martin Miguel de Güemes")
  - 5th Mountain Artillery Battalion "Captain Felipe Antonio Pereyra de Lucena" (Grupo de Artillería de Montaña 5 "Capitán Felipe Antonio Pereyra de Lucena")
  - 5th Mountain Engineer Battalion "Major-General Enrique Mosconi" (Batallón de Ingenieros de Montaña 5 "General de Division Enrique Mosconi")
  - 5th Mountain Construction Engineers Company (Compañía de Ingenieros de Construcciones de Montaña 5
  - 5th Mountain Signals Company "Lt.Colonel Gerónimo de Helguera" (Compañía de Comunicaciones de Montaña 5 "Teniente Coronel Gerónimo de Helguera")
  - 5th Mountain Light Infantry Company (Compañía de Cazadores de Montaña 5)
  - 5th Mountain Intelligence Company "Major Humberto Viola" (Compañía de Inteligencia de Montaña 5 "Mayor Humberto Viola")
  - Reserve Company "Salta" (Compañia de Reserva "Salta")
- 6th Mountain Brigade "Major-General Conrado Excelso Villegas" (Brigada de Montaña V "General de Division Conrado Excelso Villegas")
  - 10th Mountain Infantry Regiment "Lt.General Eduardo Racedo" (Regimiento de Infantería de Montaña 10 "Teniente General Eduardo Racedo")
  - 21st Mountain Infantry Regiment "Lt.General Rufino Ortega" (Regimiento de Infantería de Montaña 21 "Teniente General Rufino Ortega")
  - 26th Mountain Infantry Regiment "Colonel Benjamín Moritán" (Regimiento de Infantería de Montaña 26 "Coronel Benjamín Moritán")
  - 4th Mountain Reconnaissance Cavalry Regiment "General Lavalle's Cuirassiers" (Regimiento de Caballería de Exploración de Montaña 4 "Coraceros General Lavalle")
  - 6th Mountain Artillery Battalion (Grupo de Artillería de Montaña 6)
  - 6th Mountain Engineer Battalion (Batallón de Ingenieros de Montaña 6)
  - 6th Mountain Signal Company (Compañía de Comunicaciones de Montaña 6)
  - 6th Mountain Light Infantry Company "Captain Claudio José Jurszyszyn" (Compañía de Cazadores de Montaña 6 "Capitán Claudio José Jurszyszyn")
  - 6th Mountain Intelligence Company (Compañía de Inteligencia de Montaña 6)
- 8th Mountain Brigade "Brigadier General Toribio de Luzuriaga" (Brigada de Montaña VIII "Brigadier General Toribio de Luzuriaga")
  - 11th Mountain Infantry Regiment "General Juan Gregorio de Las Heras" (Regimiento de Infantería de Montaña 11 "General Juan Gregorio de Las Heras")
  - 16th Mountain Infantry Regiment "Andes Light Infantry" (Regimiento de Infantería de Montaña 16 "Cazadores de Los Andes")
  - 22nd Mountain Infantry Regiment "Lt.Colonel Juan Manuel Cabot" (Regimiento de Infantería de Montaña 22 "Teniente Coronel Juan Manuel Cabot")
  - 15th Mountain Reconnaissance Cavalry Regiment "Liberator Simón Bolívar" (Regimiento de Exploración de Caballería de Montaña 15 "Libertador Simón Bolívar")
  - 8th Mountain Artillery Battalion "Colonel Pedro Regalado de la Plaza" (Grupo de Artillería de Montaña 8 "Coronel Pedro Regalado de la Plaza")
  - 8th Mountain Engineer Battalion "Miners of the Cuyo" (Batallón de Ingenieros de Montaña 8 "Barreteros de Cuyo")
  - 8th Mountain Signal Company (Compañía de Comunicaciones de Montaña 8)
  - 8th Mountain Light Infantry Company "1st Lieutenant Francisco Gerónimo Ibáñez" (Compañía de Cazadores de Montaña 8 "Teniente Primero Francisco Gerónimo Ibáñez")
  - 8th Mountain Intelligence Company "Lt.Colonel Pedro Vargas" (Compañía de Inteligencia de Montaña 8 "Teniente Coronel Pedro Vargas")
- Army Military Mountain School "Lt.General Juan Domingo Perón" (Escuela Militar de Montaña "Teniente General Juan Domingo Perón")

== Armenia ==
- 10th Mountain Rifle Division (10-րդ լեռնային հրաձգային դիվիզիայի - 10-rd Lerrnayin Hradzgayin Diviziayi)
  - 5th Mountain Rifle Regiment (5-րդ լեռնային հրաձգային գնդի - 5-rd Lerrnayin Hradzgayin Gndi)
  - 6th Mountain Rifle Regiment (6-րդ լեռնային հրաձգային գնդի - 6-rd Lerrnayin Hradzgayin Gndi)
  - 7th Mountain Rifle Regiment (7-րդ լեռնային հրաձգային գնդի - 7-rd Lerrnayin Hradzgayin Gndi)

== Austria ==
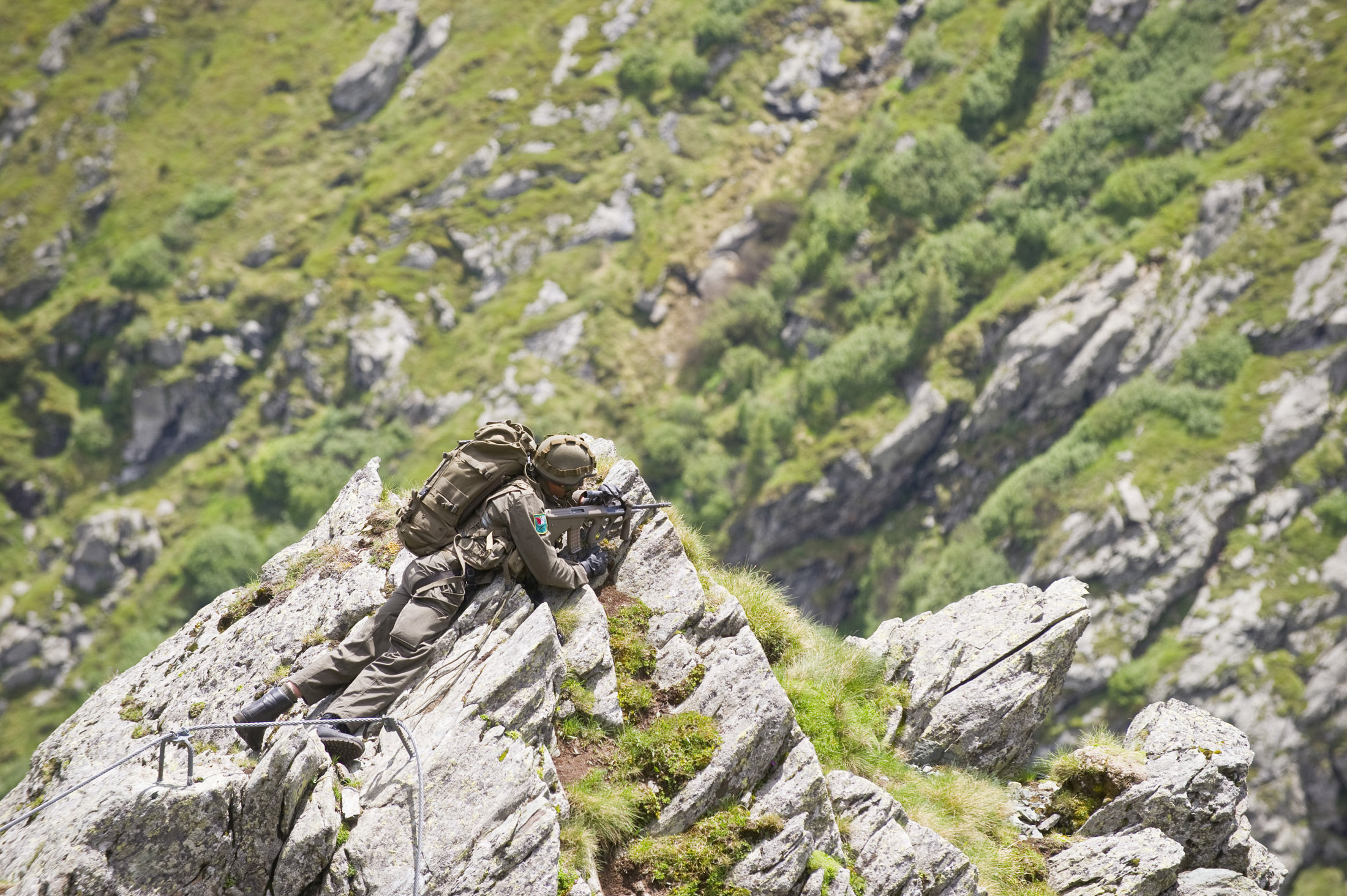
Scout of Jägerbataillon 26

- 6th Mountain Brigade (6. Gebirgsbrigade, for a detailed overview of the brigades organization see: Structure of the Austrian Armed Forces#6th Mountain Brigade
  - 6th Staff Battalion (Stabsbataillon 6) including:
    - Pack Animal Center (Tragtierzentrum)
  - 23rd Jäger Battalion (Jägerbataillon 23)
  - 24th Jäger Battalion (Jägerbataillon 24)
  - 26th Jäger Battalion (Jägerbataillon 26)
  - 2nd Engineer Battalion (Pionierbataillon 2)
    - 1x Engineer Company
- Mountain Warfare Center (Gebirgskampfzentrum)

Militia units (Miliz):

- Jäger Battalion Salzburg "Erzherzog Rainer" (Jägerbataillon Salzburg "Erzherzog Rainer")
- Jäger Battalion Tirol (Jägerbataillon Tirol)
- Jäger Vorarlberg (Jägerbataillon Vorarlberg)
- Jäger Company Oberland (Jägerkompanie Oberland)
- Jäger Company Pongau (Jägerkompanie Pongau)
- Engineer Company Tirol (Pionierkompanie Tirol)
- Engineer Company Vorarlberg (Pionierkompanie Vorarlberg)

== Azerbaijan ==
- two Mountain Infantry Regiments (Dağ-Atıcı Alayı)

== Bolivia ==
- 24th Mountain Scouts Regiment "Lt. General Germán Busch" (Regimiento de Satinadores de Montaña Nº 24 "Teniente General Germán Busch")
- 25th Andes Scouts School Regiment "Tocopilla" (Regimiento Escuela de Satinadores Andinos Nº 25 "Tocopilla")
- Mountain Scouts Regiment (Reserve) "Félix Méndez Arcos" (Regimiento Satinadores de Montaña (Reserva) "Félix Méndez Arcos")

== Brazil ==
- 4th Light Infantry Brigade (Mountain) (4ª Brigada de Infantaria Leve (Montanha)) (Note: Once a fully mountain brigade, now it have been mostry re-configured as a Light Brigade, leaving just one single specialized mountain warfare battalion.)
  - 11th Mountain Infantry Battalion "Tiradentes" (11º Batalhão de Infantaria de Montanha "Tiradentes"), including:
    - Mountain Operations Training Center ( Centro de Instrução de Operações em Montanha)

== Bulgaria ==
- 101st Alpine Regiment (101-ви Алпийски Полк - 101-vi Alpiĭski Polk)

== Canada ==
- Oscar Company, 3rd Battalion, The Royal Canadian Regiment
- Bravo Company, 3rd Battalion, Princess Patricia's Canadian Light Infantry Regiment
- C Company, 3rd Battalion, Royal 22nd Regiment
- Canadian Forces Land Advanced Warfare Centre (CFLAWC), Canadian Army Advanced Warfare Centre

== Chile ==
- Special Forces Group (Agrupación de Fuerzas Especiales)
  - Mountain Company (Compañía de Montaña)
- 3rd Mountain Division (III Division de Montaña)
  - 3rd Cavalry Regiment "Hussars" (Regimiento de Caballería n.º 3 "Húsares")
  - 3rd Mountain Detachment "Yungay" (Destacamento de Montaña Nº 3 "Yungay")
    - 18th Andine Infantry Battalion "Guardia Vieja" (Batallón de Infantería Andino Nº 18 "Guardia Vieja")
    - 2nd Mountain Engineers Company "Puente Alto" (Compañía de Ingenieros de Montaña Nº 2 "Puente Alto")
    - 2nd Mountain Artillery Battery "Arica" (Batería de Artillería de Montaña Nº 2 "Arica")
    - Mountain Reconnaissance Mounted Platoon (Pelotón de Exploración Montado de Montaña)
  - 8th Mountain Detachment "Tucapel" (Destacamento de Montaña Nº 8 "Tucapel")
    - 8th Mountain Infantry Battalion "Frontera" (Batallón de Infantería de Montaña Nº 8 "Frontera")
    - Mountain Engineers Company (Compañía de Ingenieros de Montaña)
    - 17th Mountain Artillery Battery "Urizar" (Batería de Artillería de Montaña Nº 17 "Urizar")
  - 9th Mountain Detachment "Arauco" (Destacamento de Montaña N º9 "Arauco")
    - 13th Andine Infantry Battalion "Andalién" (Batallón de Infantería Andino Nº 13 "Andalién")
    - 12th Mountain Engineers Company "Tronador" (Compañía de Ingenieros de Montaña Nº 12 "Tronador")
    - 2nd Mountain Artillery Battery "Maturana" (Batería de Artillería de Montaña Nº 2 "Maturana")
  - 17th Mountain Detachment "Los Ángeles" (Destacamento de Montaña Nº 17 "Los Ángeles")
    - 17th Mountain Infantry Battalion "Tarpellanca" (Batallón de Infantería de Montaña Nº 17 "Tarpellanca")
    - 3rd Mountain Engineers Company "Los Ángeles" (Compañía de Ingenieros de Montaña Nº 3 "Los Ángeles")
    - 16th Mountain Artillery Battery "Carvallo" (Batería de Artillería de Montaña Nº 16 "Carvallo")
- Independent Mounted Reconnaissance Squadron "Chaitén" (Escuadrón de Exploración Montado Indipendiente "Chaitén")
- 20th Divisional Andine Company "Cochrane" (Compañía Andina Divisionaria N° 20 "Cochrane")
- Army Mountain School (Escuela de Montaña del Ejército)
- Special Mountain Group (Agrupacion Especial de Montaña)

== China ==
- 32nd Mountain Jungle Brigade (山地从林32旅 - Shāndì Cóng Lín di 32 Lǚ)
- 40th Mountain Jungle Motorized Infantry Brigade (山地从林地摩托化步兵40旅 - Shāndì Cóng Lín di Mótuō Huà Bùbīng 40 Lǚ)
- 52nd Mountain Combined Arms Brigade (山地合成第52旅 - Shāndì Héchéng dì 52 Lǚ)
- 53rd Mountain Combined Arms Brigade (山地合成第53旅 - Shāndì Héchéng dì 53 Lǚ)

== Taiwan ==
- Wǔlǐng Cold Training Center (武嶺寒訓中心 - Wǔlǐng Hán Xùn Zhōngxīn)

== Colombia ==
- 1st High Mountain Battalion "Lieutenant Colonel Antonio Arredondo" (Batallón de Alta Montaña No.1 "Teniente Coronel Antonio Arredondo")
- 2nd High Mountain Battalion "General Santos Gutiérrez Prieto" (Batallón de Alta Montaña No.2 "General Santos Gutiérrez Prieto")
- 3rd High Mountain Battalion "Rodrigo Lloreda Caicedo" (Batallón de Alta Montaña No. 3 "Rodrigo Lloreda Caicedo")
- 4th High Mountain Battalion "General Benjamín Herrera Cortés" (Batallón de Alta Montaña No.4 "General Benjamín Herrera Cortés")
- 5th High Mountain Battalion "General Urbano Castellanos Castillo" (Batallón de Alta Montaña No.5 "General Urbano Castellanos Castillo")
- 6th High Mountain Battalion "Major Robinson Daniel Ruiz Garzón" (Batallón de Alta Montaña No. 6 "Mayor Robinson Daniel Ruiz Garzón")
- 7th High Mountain Battalion "Major Raúl Guillermo Mahecha Martínez" (Batallón de Alta Montaña No. 7 "Mayor Raúl Guillermo Mahecha Martínez")
- 8th High Mountain Battalion "Colonel José María Vesga" (Batallón de Alta Montaña No.8 "Coronel José María Vesga")
- 9th High Mountain Battalion (Batallón de Alta Montaña No. 9)
- 10th High Mountain Battalion "Major Oscar Giraldo Restrepo" (Batallón de Alta Montaña No. 10 "Mayor Oscar Giraldo Restrepo")
- 17th Mountain Infantry Battalion "General José Domingo Caicedo" (Batallón de Infantería de Montaña No. 17 "General José Domingo Caicedo")
- 34th Mountain Infantry Battalion "Juanambú" (Batallón de Infantería de Montaña No. 34 "Juanambú")
- 36th Mountain Infantry Battalion "Hunters" (Batallón de Infantería de Montaña No. 36 "Cazadores")
- High Mountain School (Escuela de Alta Montaña)

== Dominican Republic ==
- 3rd Mountain Regiment (3er Regimiento de Montaña)
  - 6th Mountain Light Infantry Battalion (6º Batallón Cazadores de Montaña)

== El Salvador ==
- 4th Mountain Commandos Military Detachment (Destacamento Militar 4 de Comandos de Montaña)

== France ==
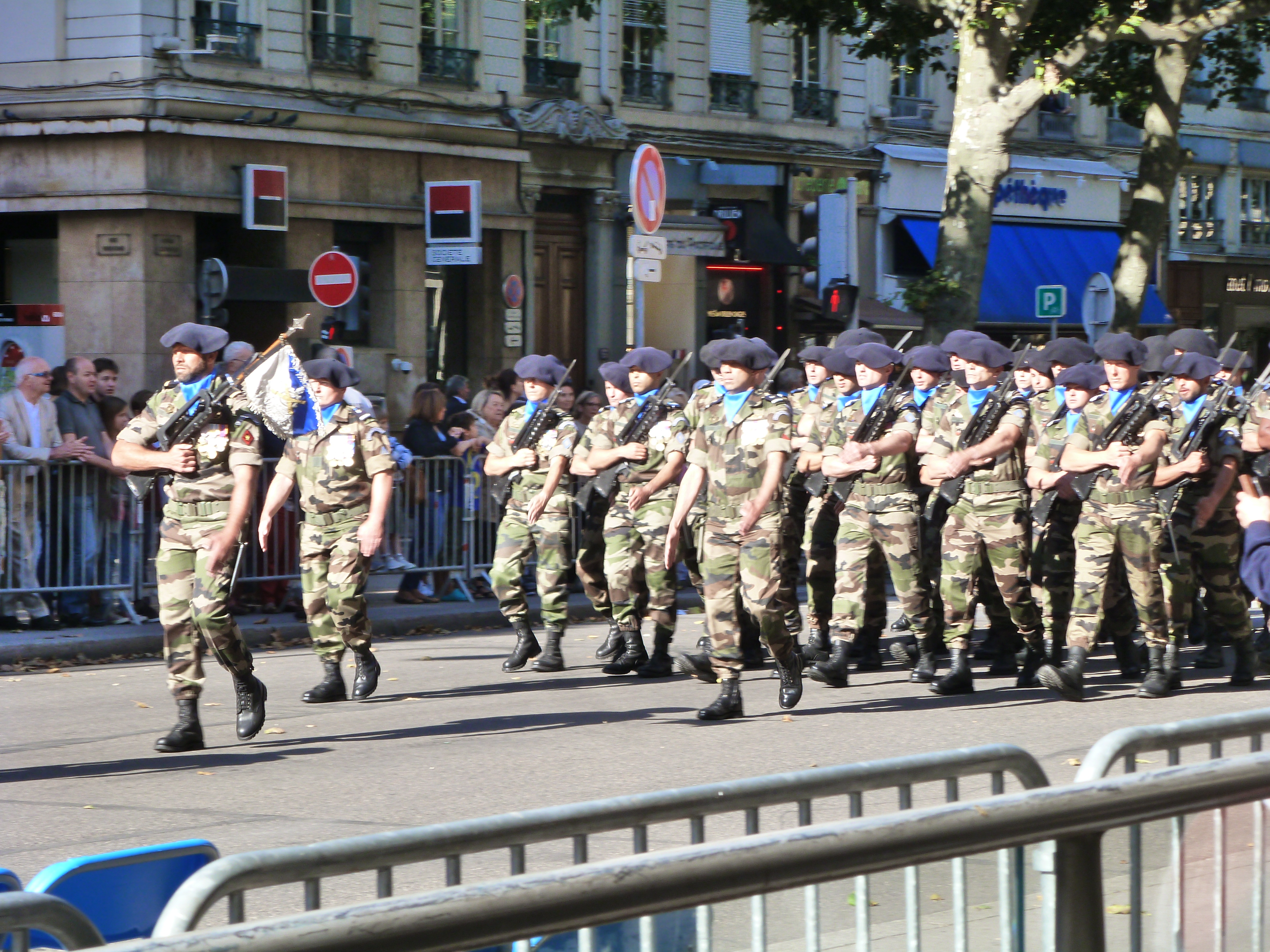
The 7e Bataillon de Chasseurs Alpins on parade, 2016

- 27th Mountain Infantry Brigade (27^{e} Brigade d'Infanterie de Montagne)
  - 27th Mountain Command and Signals Company (27^{e} Compagnie de Commandement et de Transmissions de Montagne)
  - 4th Chasseurs Regiment (4^{e} Régiment de Chasseurs)
  - 7th Chasseurs Alpins Battalion (7^{e} Bataillon de Chasseurs Alpins)
  - 13th Chasseurs Alpins Battalion (13^{e} Bataillon de Chasseurs Alpins)
  - 27th Chasseurs Alpins Battalion (27^{e} Bataillon de Chasseurs Alpins)
  - 93rd Mountain Artillery Regiment (93^{e} Régiment d'Artillerie de Montagne)
  - 2nd Foreign Engineer Regiment (2^{e} Régiment Étranger de Génie)
  - Mountain Commandos Grouping (Groupement de Commandos de Montagne) (Note: Divided in three platoons, attached one each to the 7th, 13th and 27th Mountain Light Infantry battalion, and a fourth platoon split in sections attached to the other units of the brigade (93rd artillery, 2nd engineers, 4th light cavalry))
  - High Mountain Military School (École Militaire de Haute Montagne)
  - Mountain Acclimatization Grouping (Groupement d'Aguerrissement Montagne)
    - National Mountain Acclimatization Center (Centre National d'Aguerrissement en Montagne)
    - Mountain Combat Instruction and Training Center (Centre d'Instruction et d'Entraînement au Combat en Montagne)
  - 27th Mountain Infantry Brigade Troops Initial Formation Centre / 6th Chasseurs Alpins Battalion (Centre de Formation Initiale des Militaires du rang 27e Brigade d'Infanterie de Montagne / 6e Bataillon de Chasseurs Alpins)
- 511th Transport Regiment (Mountain) (511^{e} Régiment du Train ("Montagne"))
- 7th Maintenance Regiment (7^{e} Régiment du Matériel)
- 2nd Company, 1st Marine Infantry Paratroopers Regiment (2^{e} Compagnie, 1^{er} Régiment de Parachutistes d'Infanterie de Marine)
- 2nd Company, 2nd Foreign Parachute Regiment (2^{e} Compagnie, 2^{e} Régiment Étranger de Parachutistes)
- 3rd Company, 13th Parachute Dragoon Regiment (3^{e} Compagnie, 13^{e} Régiment de Dragons Parachutistes)
- 1st Company, Medical Regiment (Régiment Médical)

== Georgia ==
- Mountain Training School "Colonel Besik Kutateladze" (პოლკოვნიკ ბესიკ ქუთათელაძის სახელობის სამთო მომზადების სკოლა - P'olk'ovnik' Besik' Kutateladzis Sakhelobis Samto Momzadebis Sk'ola)

== Germany ==
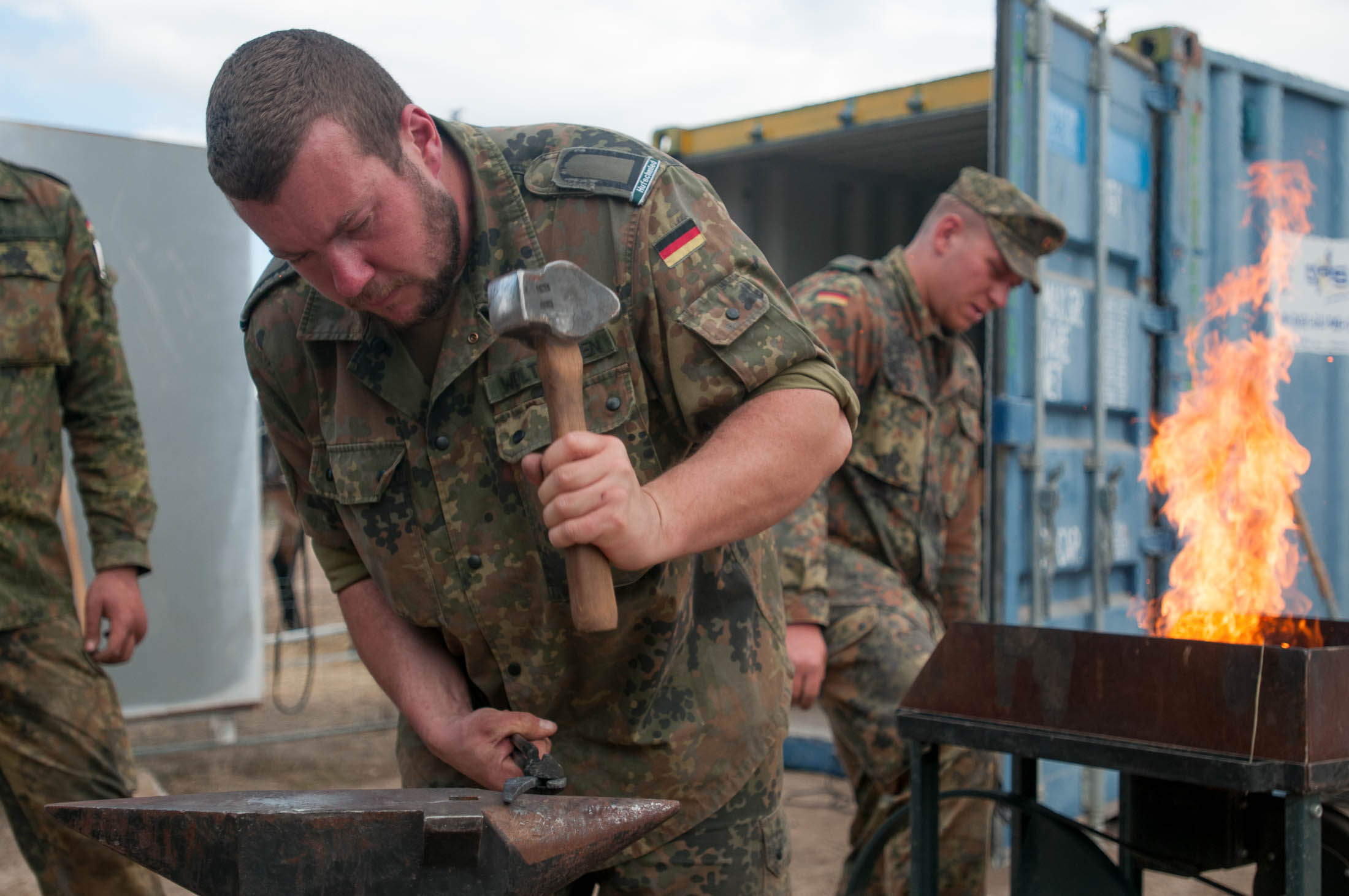
Farriers of the Gebirgsjägerbataillon 233

- 23rd Mountain Light Infantry Brigade "Bavaria" (Gebirgsjägerbrigade 23 "Bayern")
  - Staff/Signal Company (Stabs-/Fernmeldekompanie)
  - 230th Mountain Reconnaissance Battalion (Gebirgsaufklärungsbataillon 230)
  - 231st Mountain Light Infantry Battalion (Gebirgsjägerbataillon 231)
  - 232nd Mountain Light Infantry Battalion (Gebirgsjägerbataillon 232)
  - 233rd Mountain Light Infantry Battalion (Gebirgsjägerbataillon 233)
  - 8th Mountain Supply Battalion (Gebirgsversorgungsbataillon 8)
  - 8th Mountain Engineers Battalion (Gebirgspionierbataillon 8)
  - 230th Operations and Training Center for Pack Animals (Einsatz- und Ausbildungszentrum für Tragtierwesen 230)
- Mountain and Winter Warfare Training Support Point (Ausbildungsstützpunkt Gebirgs- und Winterkampf)

== Greece ==
- Mountain Raiders Company (Λόχος Ορεινών Καταδρομών - Lóchos Oreinón Katadromón)
- Mountain Training Center for Ski Warfare "Major Ioannis Paparrodou" (Κέντρο Εκπαίδευσης Ορεινού Αγώνα Χιονοδρόμων "Tαγματάρχης Ιωάννης Παπαρρόδου" - Kéntro Ekpaideisis Oreinoú Agóna Chionodrómon "Tagmatárchis Ioannis Paparrodou")

== Guatemala ==
- Mountain Operations Brigade (Brigada de Operaciones para Montaña)
  - Mountain Infantry Battalion (Batallón de Infantería de Montaña)
  - Mountain Reconnaissance Company (Compañía de Reconocimiento de Montaña)

== India ==
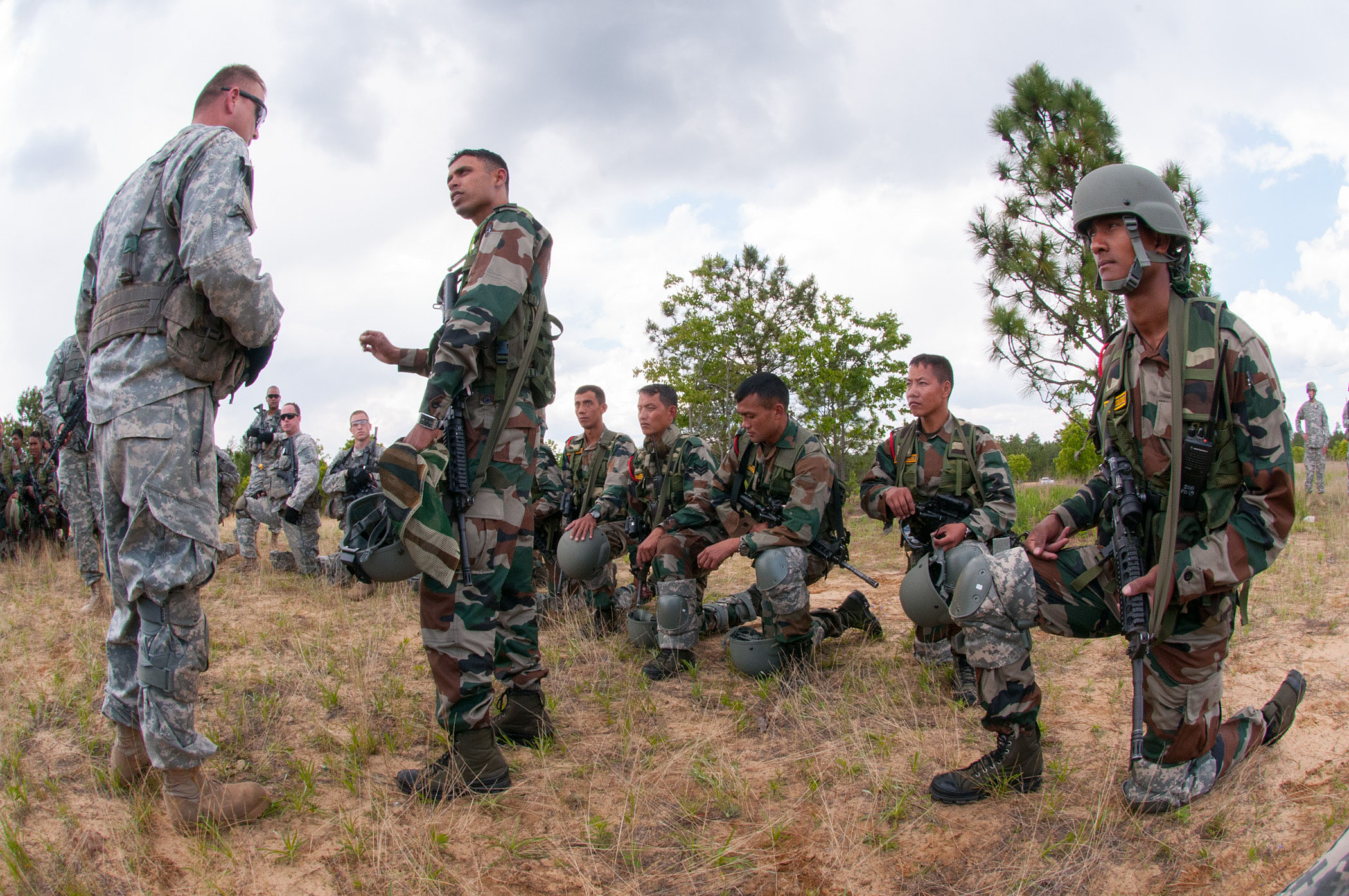
Troops of India's 99th Mountain Brigade training with US troops at exercise Yudh Abhyas in 2013

- III Mountain Corps (३री पहाड़ी पैदल सेना कोर - 3ree Pahaadee Paidal Sena Kor)
  - 2nd Mountain Infantry Division (2 वा पहाड़ी पैदल सेना विभाग - 2va Pahaadee Paidal Sena Vibhaag)
  - 56th Mountain Infantry Division (56 वा पहाड़ी पैदल सेना विभाग - 56va Pahaadee Paidal Sena Vibhaag)
  - 57th Mountain Infantry Division (57 वा पहाड़ी पैदल सेना विभाग - 57va Pahaadee Paidal Sena Vibhaag)
- IV Mountain Corps (४थी पहाड़ी पैदल सेना कोर - 4thee Pahaadee Paidal Sena Kor)
  - 5th Mountain Infantry Division (5 वा पहाड़ी पैदल सेना विभाग - 5va Pahaadee Paidal Sena Vibhaag)
  - 21st Mountain Infantry Division (21 वा पहाड़ी पैदल सेना विभाग - 21va Pahaadee Paidal Sena Vibhaag)
  - 71st Mountain Infantry Division (71 वा पहाड़ी पैदल सेना विभाग - 71va Pahaadee Paidal Sena Vibhaag)
- XVII Mountain Strike Corps (17वी पहाड़ी पैदल सेना हमला कोर - 17ree Pahaadee Paidal Sena Hamala Kor)
  - 59th Mountain Infantry Division (59 वा पहाड़ी पैदल सेना विभाग - 59va Pahaadee Paidal Sena Vibhaag)
  - 72nd Mountain Infantry Division (72 वा पहाड़ी पैदल सेना विभाग - 72va Pahaadee Paidal Sena Vibhaag)
- XXXIII Mountain Corps (३३वी पहाड़ी पैदल सेना कोर - 23ree Pahaadee Paidal Sena Kor)
  - 17th Mountain Infantry Division (17 वा पहाड़ी पैदल सेना विभाग - 17va Pahaadee Paidal Sena Vibhaag)
  - 20th Mountain Infantry Division (20 वा पहाड़ी पैदल सेना विभाग - 20va Pahaadee Paidal Sena Vibhaag)
  - 27th Mountain Infantry Division (27 वा पहाड़ी पैदल सेना विभाग - 27va Pahaadee Paidal Sena Vibhaag)
- Central Command
  - 6th Mountain Infantry Division (6 वा पहाड़ी पैदल सेना विभाग - 6va Pahaadee Paidal Sena Vibhaag)
- XIV Mountain Corps
  - 8th Mountain Infantry Division (8 वा पहाड़ी पैदल सेना विभाग - 8va Pahaadee Paidal Sena Vibhaag)
- XV Mountain Corps
  - 28th Mountain Infantry Division (28 वा पहाड़ी पैदल सेना विभाग - 28va Pahaadee Paidal Sena Vibhaag)
- 77th Mountain Infantry Brigade "Chindits" (77 वा पहाड़ी पैदल सेना ब्रिगेड "चिंदित"- 77va Pahaadee Paidal Sena Briged "Chindit")
- 99th Mountain Brigade (99 वा पहाड़ी पैदल सेना ब्रिगेड - 99va Pahaadee Paidal Sena Briged)
- 9th Parachute Special Forces Battalion (9 वा पैरा स्पेशल फोर्सेज़ - 9va Paira Speshal Phorsez Bataaliyan)
- High Altitude Warfare School (हाई एल्टीट्यूड वारफेयर स्कूल - Haee Elteetyood Vaarapheyar Skool)

== Israel ==
- Alpinist Unit (Reserve Duty) (יחידת האלפיניסטים (מילואים)- Yehidat Ha'Alpinistim (Miluiym Shem))
- HeHarim Brigade (In Hebrew: חטיבת ההרים or Khativat Ha'Harim) - The brigade is the other military brigade for the security of the partner in the northern area of the mountains in the Golan Heights, and under its responsibility are all the units engaged in warfare in cold and mountainous terrain. This brigade mainly replaced the Hermon Brigade, and a number of other units that will be included in its responsibility. (The unit has been active for a month Merc 2024).

== Italy ==
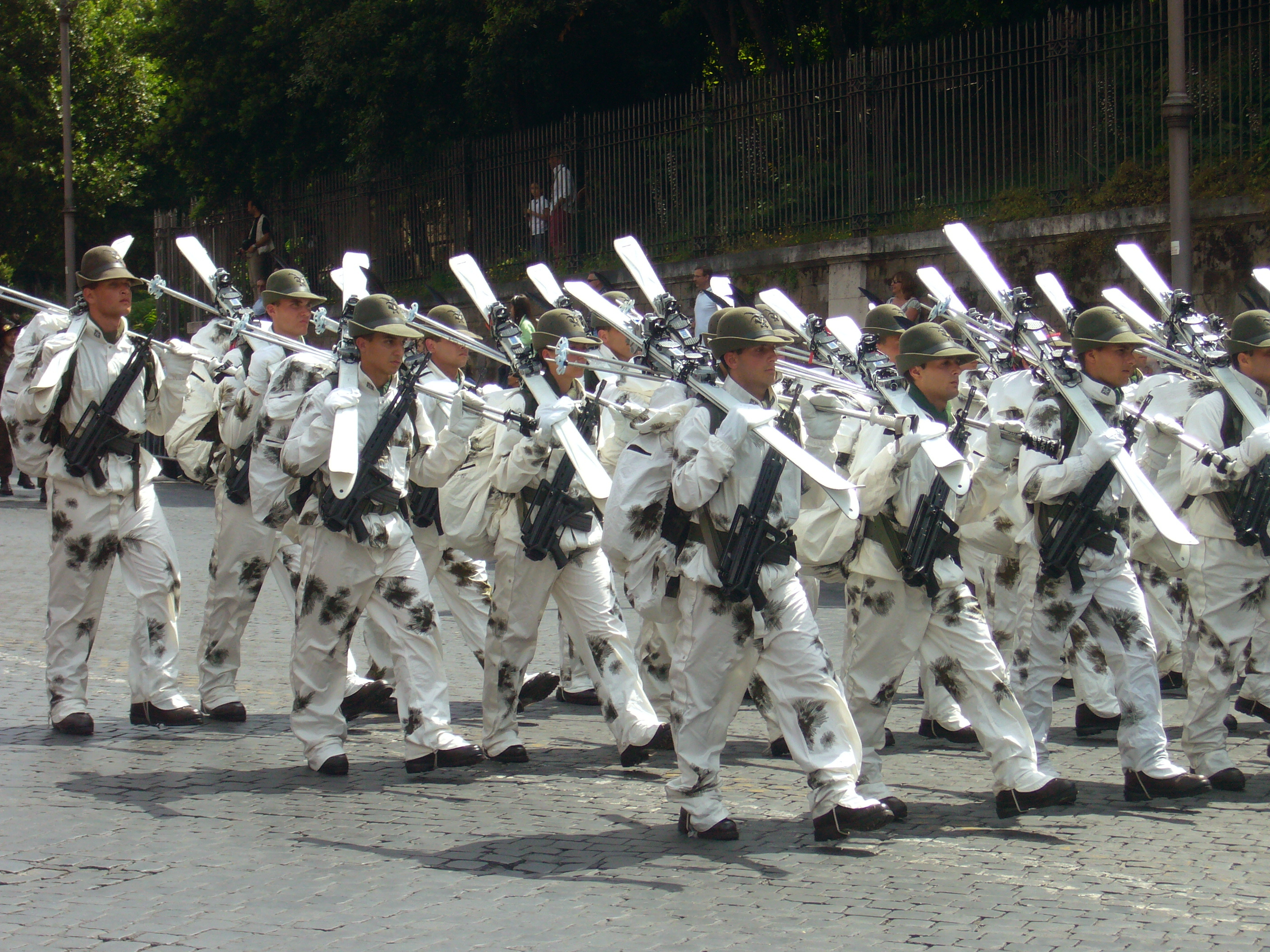
Skiers of the 8th Alpini Regiment, 2010

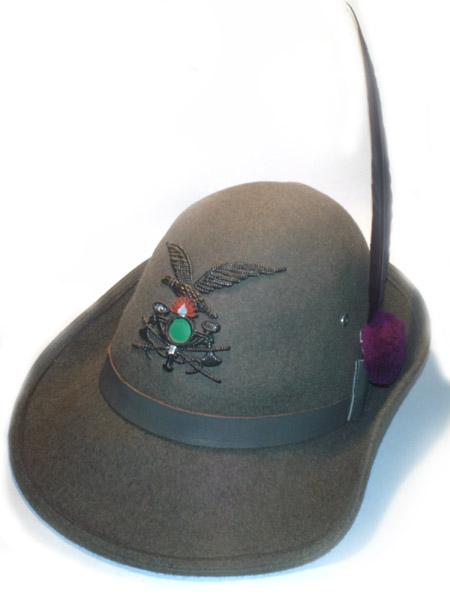
The traditional Alpini hat

- Italian Army
  - Alpine Troops Command (Comando Truppe Alpine)
    - Division "Tridentina" Command (Commando Divisione "Tridentina") (Note: Divisional command to be activated only in case of emergency. No units permanently assigned except its HQ and Tactical Supports Unit.)
      - Headquarters and Tactical Supports Unit "Tridentina" (Reparto Comando e Supporti Tattici "Tridentina")
    - Alpine Training Center (Centro Addestramento Alpino)
      - Training Regiment (Reggimento Addestrativo)
        - Training Battalion "Aosta" (Battaglione addestrativo "Aosta")
      - 6th Alpini Regiment (6° Reggimento Alpini)
        - Alpini Battalion "Bassano" (Battaglione Alpini "Bassano")
    - Alpine Brigade "Taurinense" (Brigata Alpina "Taurinense")
      - Headquarters and Tactical Supports Unit "Taurinense" (Reparto Comando e Supporti Tattici "Taurinense")
      - 2nd Alpini Regiment (2° Reggimento Alpini)
        - Alpini Battalion "Saluzzo" (Battaglione Alpini "Saluzzo")
      - 3rd Alpini Regiment (3° Reggimento Alpini)
        - Alpini Battalion "Susa" (Battaglione Alpini "Susa")
      - 9th Alpini Regiment (9° Reggimento Alpini)
        - Alpini Battalion "L'Aquila" (Battaglione Alpini "L'Aquila")
        - Multifunctional Battalion "Vicenza" (Battaglione Multifunzionale "Vicenza")
      - 1st Field Artillery Regiment (Mountain) (1° Reggimento Artiglieria Terrestre (Montagna))
        - Artillery Group "Aosta" (Gruppo "Aosta")
      - 32nd Engineer Regiment (32° Reggimento Genio Guastatori)
        - 30th Engineer Battalion (30° Battaglione Genio Guastatori)
      - Logistic Regiment "Taurinense" (Reggimento Logistico "Taurinense")
    - Alpine Brigade "Julia" (Brigata Alpina "Julia")
      - Headquarters and Tactical Supports Unit "Julia" (Reparto Comando e Supporti Tattici "Julia")
      - 5th Alpini Regiment (5° Reggimento Alpini)
        - Alpini Battalion "Morbegno" (Battaglione Alpini "Morbegno")
      - 7th Alpini Regiment (7° Reggimento Alpini)
        - Alpini Battalion "Feltre" (Battaglione Alpini "Feltre")
      - 8th Alpini Regiment (8° Reggimento Alpini)
        - Alpini Battalion "Tolmezzo" (Battaglione Alpini "Tolmezzo")
      - 3rd Field Artillery Regiment (Mountain) (3° Reggimento Artiglieria Terrestre (Montagna))
        - Artillery Group "Conegliano" (Gruppo "Conegliano")
      - 2nd Engineer Regiment (2° Reggimento Genio Guastatori)
        - 31st Engineer Battalion "Iseo" (31° Battaglione Genio Guastatori "Iseo")
      - Logistic Regiment "Julia" (Reggimento Logistico "Julia")
  - 4th Alpini Paratroopers Regiment (4° Reggimento Alpini Paracadutisti)
    - Alpini Paratroopers Battalion "Monte Cervino"" (Battaglione Alpini Paracadutisti "Monte Cervino")
    - Operational Support Battalion "Intra" - (Battaglione Supporto Operativo "Intra")
  - 2nd Alpine Signal Regiment (2° Reggimento Trasmissioni Alpino)
    - Alpine Signal Battalion "Gardena" (Battaglione Trasmissioni Alpino "Gardena")
    - Alpine Signal Battalion "Pordoi" (Battaglione Trasmissioni Alpino "Pordoi")
  - 1st Battery "Draghi", 185th Paratroopers Reconnaissance Target Acquisition Regiment "Folgore" (1ª Batteria "Draghi", 185º Reggimento Paracadutisti Ricognizione Acquisizione Obiettivi "Folgore")
- Carabinieri
  - Mountain Platoons, 1st Paratroopers Carabinieri Regiment "Tuscania" (1º Reggimento Carabinieri Paracadutisti "Tuscania")

== Japan ==
- 13th Infantry Regiment (第13普通科連隊 - Dai 13 Futsūkarentai)
  - Alpen Rangers (アルペンレンジャ - Arupenrenjā)

== Jordan ==
- 61st Rapid Intervention Battalion - Raiders (كتيبة التدخل السريع / 61 المغاوير - Katibat al-Tadakhul al-Sariea/61 al-Maghawir)

== Kazakhstan ==
- 5th Mountain Rifle Brigade (5-я Горнострелковая Бригада - 5-ya Gornostrelkovaya Brigada)
- Independent Mountain Light Horse Regiment (Отдельный Конный Горно-Егерский Полк - Otdel'iy Konniy Gorno-Yegerskiy Polk)

== North Korea ==
- 43rd Mountain Alert Sniper Brigade (제43산악경보병저격여단 - je43 San-Aggyeong Bobyeong Jeogyeog-Yeodan)

== South Korea ==
- 1st Mountain Brigade (제1산악여단 - je1 San-ag Yeodan)
- 23rd Marines Mountain Battalion (제23해병 산악대대 - je23 Haebyeong San-ag Daedae)
- 33rd Marines Mountain Battalion (제33해병 산악대대 - je33 Haebyeong San-ag Daedae)
- 71st Marines Mountain Battalion (제71해병 산악대대 - je71 Haebyeong San-ag Daedae)
- Mountain Warfare Training Center

== Kyrgyzstan ==
- 68th Independent Mountain Rifle Brigade (68-я Отдельная Горно-Стрелковая Бригада - 68-ya Otdel'naya Gorno-Strelkovaya Brigada)
- Mountain Rifle Battalion "Batken" (Баткенский Горно-Стрелковый Батальон – Batkenskiy Gorno-Strelkovyy Batal'on)

== Lebanon ==
- Commando Regiment (فوج المغاوير - Fawj al-Maghaweer)
  - Mountain Combat Company ( سرية القتال الجبلي، - Siriyat Alqital Aljibalii)
- Ski School (مدرسة التزلج - Madrasat Altazluj)

== Mexico ==
- Mountain Operations Training Sub-Center "El Salto" - High Command Special Forces (Sub-Centro de Adiestramiento de Operaciones en Montaña "El Salto" - Fuerzas Especiales del Alto Mando)
- Medium and High Mountain Training Group - Parachute Rifle Brigade (Grupo de instrucción de Media y Alta Montaña - Brigada de Fusileros Paracaidistas)

== Montenegro ==
- Mountain Company of the Infantry Battalion (Планинска Чета/Пешадијски Батаљон - Planinska Četa/Pešadijski Bataljon)

== Morocco ==
- 1st Ski Battalion "Atlas Light Infantry" (1e Bataillon des Skieurs "Chasseurs de l'Atlas")
- High Mountain Training Center (Centre d'Instruction de Haute Montagne)

== NATO ==
- NATO Mountain Warfare Centre of Excellence

== Nepal ==
- High Altitude and Mountain Warfare School (उच्च अल्टिट्यूड र माउन्टाइन वारफेयर स्कूल - Ucca Alṭiṭyūḍa ra Mā'unṭā'ina Vāraphēyara Skūla)

== New Zealand ==
- Mountain Troops, 1st New Zealand Special Air Service Regiment

== Netherlands ==
- Marine Corps Mountain Leader Reconnaissance Platoon (Korps Mariniers Mountain Leader Verkenningspeloton)
- Joint Centre of Competence for Military Operations in Extreme Conditions (Joint Kennis Centrum Militair Optreden in Extreme Omstandigheden )

== Nicaragua ==
- Mountain Military Detachment (Destacamento Militar de Montaña)

== Pakistan ==
- X Corps
  - Force Command Northern Areas
    - 61st Brigade
    - 62nd Brigade
    - 80th Brigade
    - 150th Brigade
    - 323rd Brigade
  - 19th Infantry Division
- Army High Altitude School

== Peru ==
- 4th Mountain Brigade "Manco Cápac" (4ª Brigada de Montaña "Manco Cápac")
  - 21st Motor Infantry Battalion "Junin" (Batallón de Infantería Motorizado Nº21 "Junin")
  - 55th Motor Infantry Battalion "Colonel Mariano Bustamante" (Batallón de Infantería Motorizado Nº55 "Coronel Mariano Bustamante")
  - 59th Motor Infantry Battalion "Colonel Belisario Barriga" (Batallón de Infantería Motorizado Nº59 "Coronel Belisario Barriga")
  - 4th Field Artillery Group "Colonel José Inclan" (Grupo de Artillería de Campaña Nº4 "Coronel José Inclan")
- 5th Mountain Brigade (5ª Brigada de Montaña)
  - 9th Motor Infantry Battalion "Caquetá" (Batallón de Infantería Motorizado N°9 "Caquetá")
  - 30th Motor Infantry Battalion "Lt.Eduardo Astete Mendoza" (Batallón de Infantería Motorizado "Teniente Eduardo Astete Mendoza" N°30")
  - 35th Motor Infantry Battalion "Felipe Santiago Salaverry" (Batallón de Infantería Motorizado Nº35 "Felipe Santiago Salaverry")
- 113th Mountain Cavalry Squadron "Colonel Justo Pastor Dávila" (Escuadrón de Caballería de Montaña Nº113 "Coronel Justo Pastor Dávila")
- Army Mountain School (Escuela de Montaña del Ejército)

== Poland ==
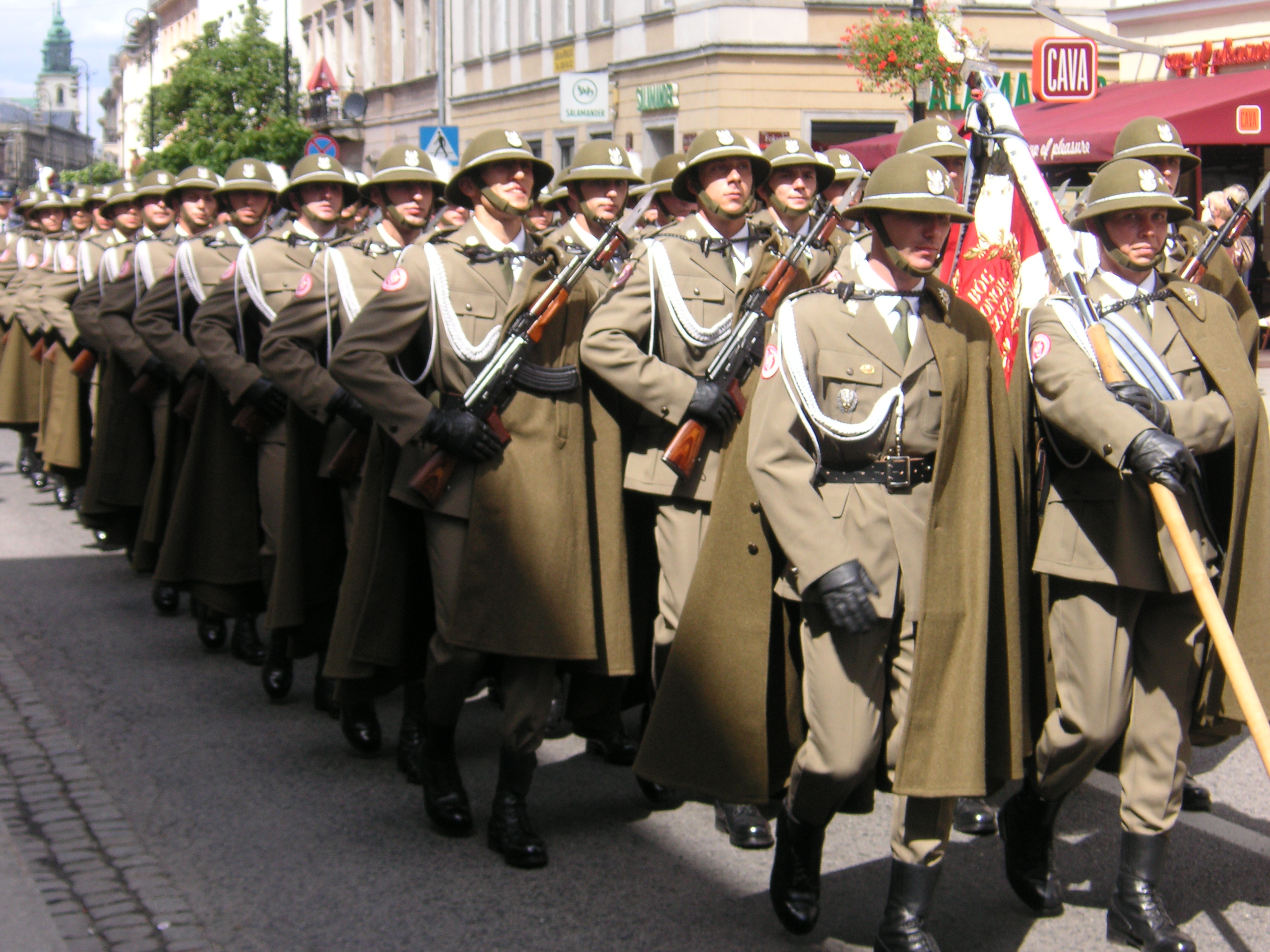
Podhale Riflemen

- 21st Podhale Rifles Brigade "Brigadier General Mieczysław Boruta-Spiechowicz" (21 Brygada Strzelców Podhalańskich im. gen. bryg. Mieczysława Boruty-Spiechowicza)
  - 21st Command Battalion "Brigadier General Zygmunt Bohusz-Szyszko" (21 Batalion Dowodzenia im. gen. bryg. Zygmunta Szyszko-Bohusza)
  - 1st Podhale Rifles Battalion "Brigadier General Józef Kustroń" (Batalion Strzelców Podhalańskich im. gen. bryg. Józefa Kustronia)
  - 5th Podhale Rifles Battalion "Brigadier General Andrzej Galica" (5 Batalion Strzelców Podhalańskich im. gen. bryg. Andrzeja Galicy)
  - 22nd Carpathian Mountains Infantry Battalion "Major General Bronisław Prugar-Ketling" (22 Karpacki Batalion Piechoty Górskiej im. gen. dyw. Bronisława Prugar-Ketlinga)
  - 14th Self-propelled Artillery Group "Brigadier General Wacław Wieczorkiewicz" (14 Dywizjon Artylerii Samobieżnej im. gen. bryg. Wacława Wieczorkiewicza)
  - 21st Anti-Aircraft Artillery Group "Division General Józef Zając" (21 Dywizjon Artylerii Przeciwlotniczej im. gen. dyw. Józefa Zająca)
  - 21st Logistic Battalion "Brigadier General Jerzy Dobrodzicki" (21 Batalion Logistyczny im. gen. bryg. Jerzego Kazimierza Dobrodzickiego)
- Centre of Mountain Training of the Military Academy of Land Forces (Centrum Szkoleń Górskich Akademii Wojsk Lądowych )
- Mountain Infantry Training Center "Fir" (Ośrodek Szkolenia Piechoty Górskiej "Jodła")

== Romania ==
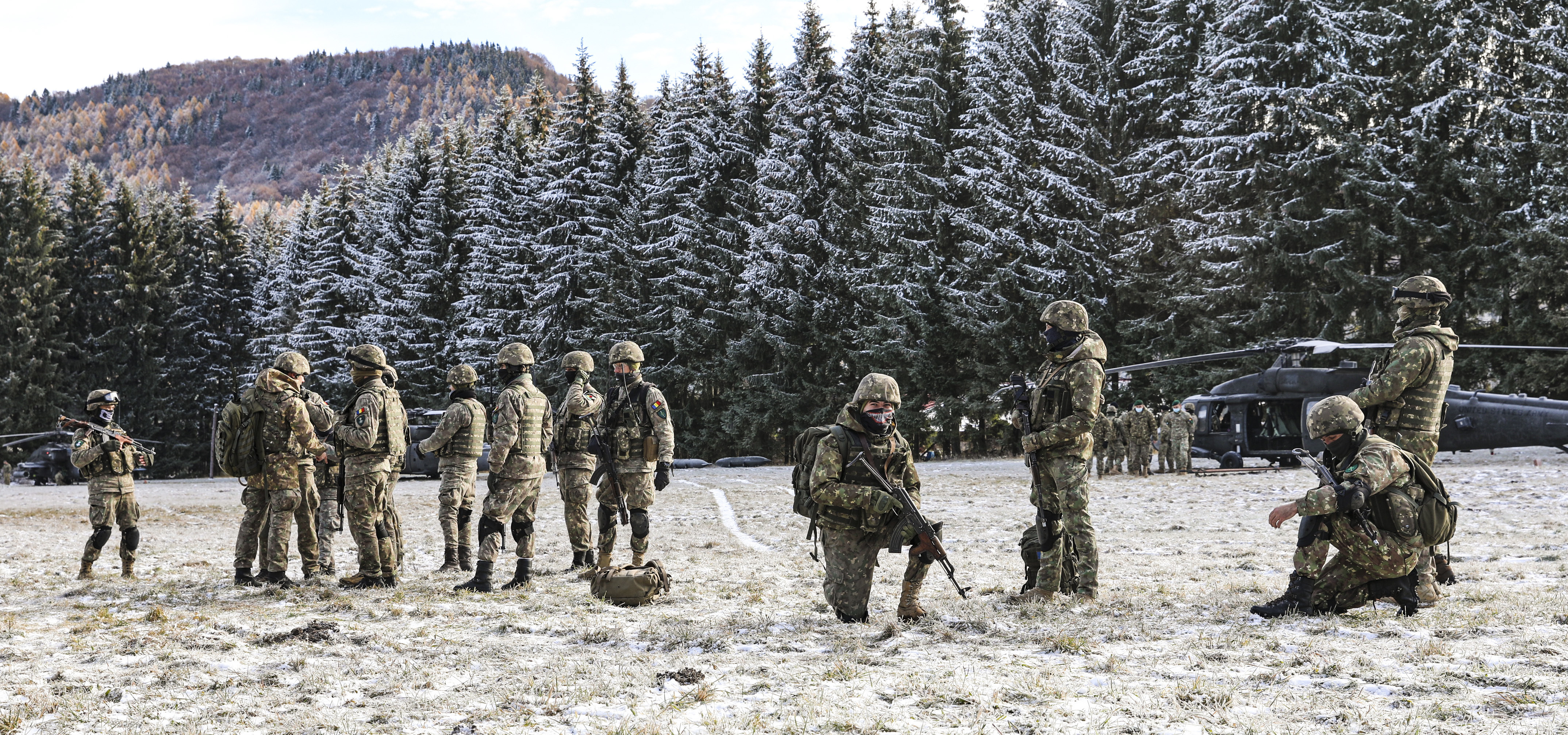
Romanian Vânători de Munte

- 2nd Mountain Troops Brigade "Sarmizegetusa" (Brigada 2 Vânători de Munte "Sarmizegetusa")
  - 21st Mountain Troops Battalion "General Leonard Mociulschi" (Batalionul 21 Vânători de Munte "General Leonard Mociulschi")
  - 30th Mountain Troops Battalion "Dragoslavele" (Batalionul 30 Vânători de Munte "Dragoslavele")
  - 33rd Mountain Troops Battalion "Posada" (Batalionul 33 Vânători de Munte "Posada")
  - 206th Artillery Battalion "General Mihail Lăcătușu" (Batalionul 206 Artilerie "General Mihail Lăcătușu")
  - 228th Anti-aircraft Defence Battalion "Piatra Craiului" (Batalionul 228 Apărare Antiaeriană "Piatra Craiului")
  - 229th Logistic Support Battalion "Cumidava" (Batalionul 229 Sprijin Logistic "Cumidava")
  - 206th Reconnaissance Company (Compania 206 Cercetare)
  - 230th Support Company (Compania 230 Sprijin)
  - 231st Military Police Company (Compania 231 Poliție Militară)
  - 249th Communications and Information Technology Company (Compania 249 Comunicații și Tehnologia Informației)
  - 363rd Engineer Company (Compania 363 Geniu)
  - 391st CBRN Defence Company (Compania 391 Apărare CBRN)
- 61st Mountain Troops Brigade "General Virgil Bădulescu" (Brigada 61 Vânători de Munte "General Virgil Bădulescu")
  - 17th Mountain Troops Battalion "Voivode Dragoș" (Batalionul 17 Vânători de Munte "Dragoș Vodă" )
  - 22nd Mountain Troops Battalion "Cireșoaia" (Batalionul 22 Vânători de Munte "Cireșoaia")
  - 24th Mountain Troops Battalion "General Gheorghe Avramescu" (Batalionul 24 Vânători de Munte "General Gheorghe Avramescu")
  - 385th Artillery Battalion "John Hunyadi" (Batalionul 385 Artilerie "Iancu de Hunedoara")
  - 468th Anti-aircraft Artillery Battalion "Trotuș" (Batalionul 468 Apărare Antiaeriană "Trotuș")
  - 435th Logistic Support Battalion "Ciuc" (Batalionul 435 Sprijin Logistic "Ciuc")
  - 415th CBRN Defence Company (Compania 415 Apărare CBRN)
  - 429th Reconnaissance Company (Compania 429 Cercetare)
  - 440th Support Company (Compania 440 Sprijin)
  - 444th Engineer Company (Compania 444 Geniu)
  - Communications and Information Technology Company (Compania Comunicații și Tehnologia Informației)
  - Hippo Company (Pack Animal) (Compania Hipo)
  - Military Police Company (Compania Poliție Militară)
- Maneuver Training Center "Constantin Brâncoveanu" (Centrul de Instruire Manevră "Constantin Brâncoveanu")
  - Mountain Troops Training Base "Bucegi" (Baza de Instruire Vânători de Munte "Bucegi")

== Russia ==
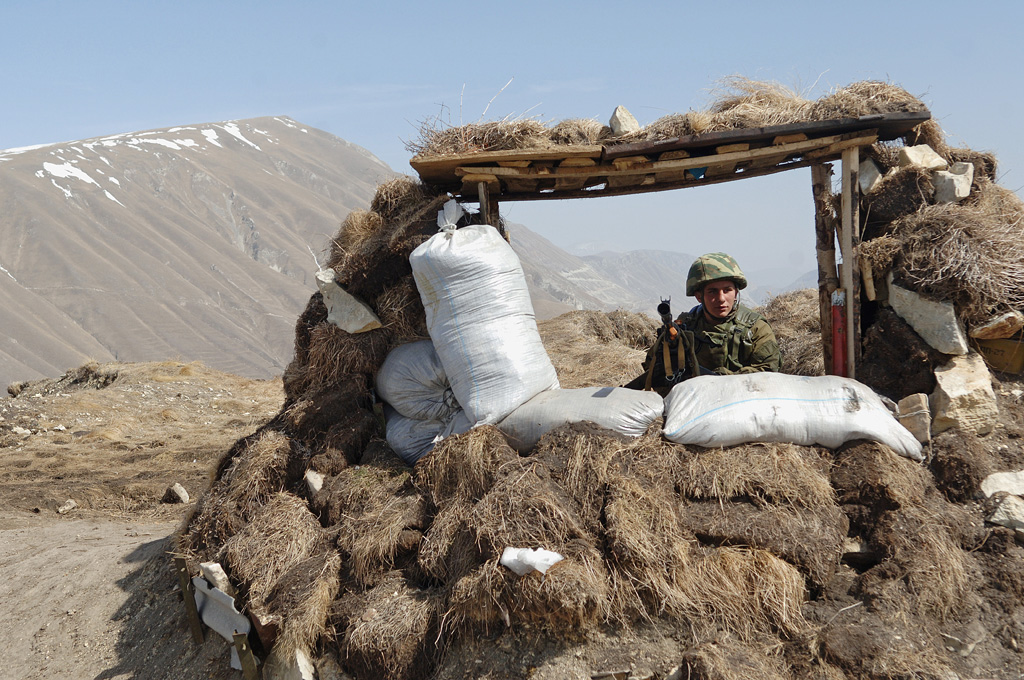
Trooper of the 33rd Independent Mountain Brigade in Dagestan, 2008

- 7th Guards Airborne Assault Division (Mountain) (7-я Гвардейская Десантно-Штурмовая Дивизия (Горная) - 7-ya Gvardeyskaya Desantno-Shturmovaya Diviziya (Gornaya))
  - 108th Guards Airborne Assault "Kuban Cossacks" Regiment (108-й Гвардейский Десантно-Штурмовой "Кубанский Kазачий" Полк - 108-y Gvardeyskiy Desantno-Shturmovoy "Kubanskiy Kazachiy" Polk)
  - 247th Guards Airborne Assault "Caucasus Cossack" Regiment (247-й Гвардейский Десантно-Штурмовой "Кавказский Kазачий" Полк - 247-y Gvardeyskiy Desantno-Shturmovoy "Kavkazskiy Kazachiy" Polk)
- 34th Independent Motorized Rifle Brigade (Mountain) (34-я Отдельная Мотострелковая Бригада (Горная) - 34-ya Otdel'naya Motostrelkovaya Brigada (Gornaya))
  - 1001st Independent Motorized Rifle Battalion (Mountain) (1001-й Отдельный Мотострелковый Батальон (Горный) - 1001-y Otdel'nyy Motostrelkovyy Batal'on (Gornyy))
  - 1021st Independent Motorized Rifle Battalion (Mountain) (1001-й Отдельный Мотострелковый Батальон (Горный) - 1001-y Otdel'nyy Motostrelkovyy Batal'on (Gornyy))
  - 1119th Independent Reconnaissance Rifle Battalion (Mountain) (1199-й Отдельный Разведывательный Батальон (Горный) - 1199-y Otdel'nyy Razvedyvatel'nyy Batal'on (Gornyy))
  - Pack Transport Platoon (Вьючно-транспортный взвод - V'yuchno-Transportnyy Vzvod)
- 55th Independent Motorized Rifle Brigade (Mountain) (55-я Отдельная Мотострелковая Бригада (Горная) - 55-ya Otdel'naya Motostrelkovaya Brigada (Gornaya)) including:
  - Pack Transport Unit (вьючно-транспортного подразделения - V'yuchno-Transportnogo Podrazdeleniya)
- 858th Independent Motorized Rifle Battalion (Mountain) (858-й Отдельный Мотострелковый Батальон (Горный) - 858-y Otdel'nyy Motostrelkovyy Batal'on (Gornyy))
- 1st Battalion (Mountain)/126th Independent Coast Defense Brigade "Gorlovka" (1-я Батальон (Горный)/126-я Отдельная Горловская Бригада Береговой Обороны – 1-ya Batal'on (Gornyy)/126-ya Otdel'naya Gorlovskaya Brigada Beregovoy Oborony)
- Center for Mountain Training and Survival "Terskol" (Центр Горной Подготовки и Выживания "Терскол" - Tsentr Gornoy Podgotovki i Vyzhivaniya "Terskol")

== Saudi Arabia ==
- King Salman's Center for Mountain Warfare (مركز الملك سلمان للحرب الجبلية - Markaz al-Malik Salman Lilharb al-Jabalia)

== Slovenia ==
- 132nd Mountain Regiment (132. Gorski Polk), including
  - Slovenian Army Mountain School (Gorska Šola Slovenske Vojske)

== Spain ==
Coat of arms of the Compañía de Esquiadores Escaladores Nº1

- Mountain Group of His Majesty the King's Royal Guard Regiment (Grupo de Montaña del Regimiento de la Guardia Real de Su Majestad el Rey)
- Mountain Troops Command (Mando de Tropas de Montaña)
  - 64th Mountain Light Infantry Regiment "Galicia" (Regimiento de Infantería "Galicia" n.º 64 de Cazadores de Montaña)
    - I/64th Mountain Light Infantry Battalion "Pyrenees" (Batallón de Cazadores de Montaña "Pireneos" I/64), including:
      - 1st Skiers Climbers Company (Compañía de Esquiadores Escaladores Nº1)
  - 66th Mountain Light Infantry Regiment "América" (Regimiento de Infantería "América" n.º 66 de Cazadores de Montaña)
    - II/66th Mountain Light Infantry Battalion "Montejurra" (Batallón de Cazadores de Montaña "Montejurra" II/66)
  - Mountain and Special Operations Training School (Escuela Militar de Montaña y Operaciones Especiales), including:
    - High Mountain Military Group (Grupo Militar de Alta Montaña)

== Sweden ==
- Mountain Light Infantry Platoon (Bergsjägarplutonen)

== Switzerland ==
Swiss army Mountain Specialist collar tabs

- 6th Mountain Rifle Battalion (Gebirgsschützenbataillon 6)
- 7th Mountain Infantry Battalion (Bataillon d'Infanterie de Montagne 7)
- 29th Mountain Infantry Battalion (Gebirgsinfanteriebataillon 29)
- 30th Mountain Infantry Battalion (Battaglione di Fanteria di Montagna 30)
- 48th Mountain Infantry Battalion (Gebirgsinfanteriebataillon 48)
- 85th Mountain Infantry Battalion (Gebirgsinfanteriebataillon 85)
- 91st Mountain Infantry Battalion (Gebirgsinfanteriebataillon 91)
- Army Mountain Service Competence Center (Kompetenzzentrum Gebirgsdienst der Armee - Centre de Compétences du Service Alpin de l'Armée - Centro di Competenza Servizio Alpino dell'Esercito)
  - 1st Mountain Specialists Group (Gebirgsspezialistenabteilung 1 - Groupe des Spécialistes de Montagne 1 - Gruppo Specialisti di Montagna 1)
  - 15th Mountain Specialists School (Gebirgsspezialisten Schule 15 - École Spécialistes de Montagne 15 - Scuola Specialisti di Montagna 15)
  - 104th/204th Mountain Specialists Readiness Detachment (Gebirgsspezialisten Bereitschaftsdetachement 104/204 - Détachement d'Engagement Spécialistes de Montagne 104/204 - Distaccamento di Prontezza all'Impiego Specialisti di Montagna)

== Thailand ==
- 7th Infantry Division
- Ranger Training Center
- Special Force Training Center

== Turkey ==
- Hakkari Mountain and Commando Brigade (Hakkâri Dağ ve Komando Tugayı)
  - 1st Mountain and Commando Battalion (1.inci Dağ ve Komando Tabur)
  - 3rd Mountain and Commando Battalion (3.üncü Dağ ve Komando Tabur)
  - 4th Mountain and Commando Battalion (4.üncü Dağ ve Komando Tabur)
- Mountain Commando School and Training Center (Dağ Komando Okulu ve Eğitim Merkezi)

== Uganda ==
- 1st Alpine Brigade
- Mountain Warfare Training School

== Ukraine ==
Coat of arms of the 10th Independent Mountain Assault Brigade

- 10th Independent Mountain Assault Brigade (10-та Окрема Гірсько-Штурмова Бригада - 10-ta Okrema Hirsʹko-Shturmova Bryhada)
  - 8th Independent Mountain Assault Battalion (8-ий Окремий Гірсько-Штурмовий Батальйон - 109-iy Okremiy Hirsʹko-Shturmoiy Batalʹyon)
  - 108th Independent Mountain Assault Battalion (108-ий Окремий Гірсько-Штурмовий Батальйон - 108-iy Okremiy Hirsʹko-Shturmoiy Batalʹyon)
  - 109th Independent Mountain Assault Battalion (109-ий Окремий Гірсько-Штурмовий Батальйон - 109-iy Okremiy Hirsʹko-Shturmoiy Batalʹyon)
- 128th Independent Mountain Assault Brigade "Transcarpatia" (128-ма Окрема Гірсько-Штурмова Закарпатська Бригада – 128-ta Okrema Hirsʹko-Shturmova Zakarpatsʹka Bryhada)
  - 15th Independent Mountain Assault Battalion (15-ий Окремий Гірсько-Штурмовий Батальйон - 15-iy Okremiy Hirsʹko-Shturmoiy Batalʹyon)

== United Kingdom ==
- Army
  - Mountain Troops, 22 Special Air Service Regiment
  - Joint Service Mountain Training Centre
- Navy
  - Royal Marines Mountain Leader Training Cadre

== United States ==
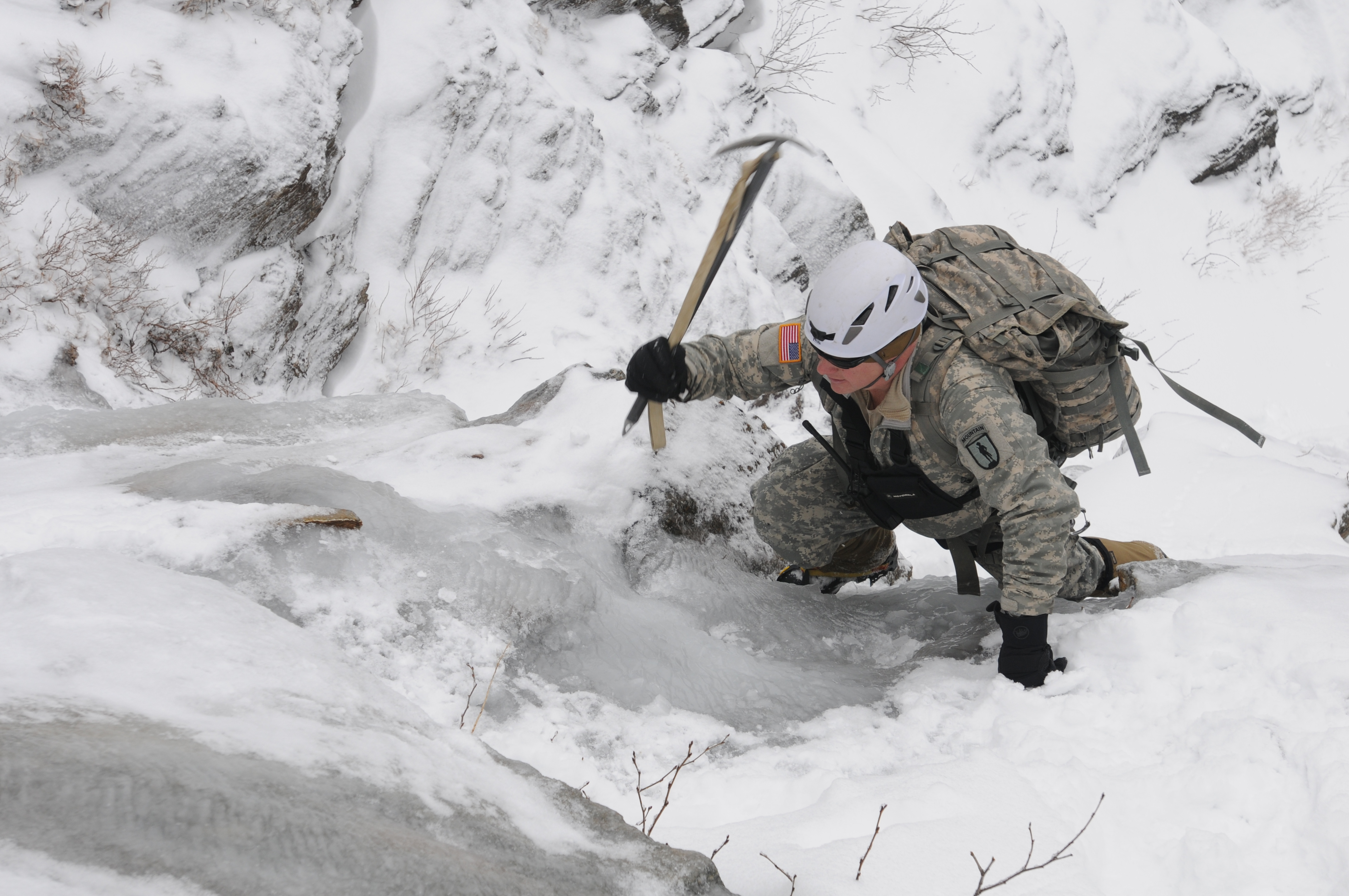
Vermont National Guard mountain instructor, 2013

- Army
  - 86th Infantry Brigade Combat Team (Mountain) (ARNG) "The Vermont Brigade" (Note: Aligned to the 10th Mountain Division as part of the Associated Units Pilot Program. The 10th Mountain Division is no longer a mountain division except in name and traditions. See Avery Cunningham (15 October 2016). "Vermont Brigade dons 10th Mountain Division Patch". vvt.public.ng.mil.)
    - 1st Battalion, 102nd Infantry Regiment (Mountain) (Connecticut National Guard)
    - 1st Battalion, 157th Infantry Regiment (Mountain) (Colorado National Guard)
    - 3rd Battalion, 172nd Infantry Regiment (Mountain) (Vermont National Guard)
    - 1st Battalion, 101st Field Artillery Regiment (Massachusetts National Guard)
    - 1st Squadron, 172nd Cavalry Regiment (Mountain) (Vermont National Guard)
    - 186th Brigade Support Battalion (Mountain) (Vermont National Guard)
    - 572th Brigade Engineer Support Battalion (Mountain) (Vermont National Guard)
  - Army Mountain Warfare School (Vermont National Guard)
  - Northern Warfare Training Center
  - Special Forces Advanced Mountain Operations School
- Navy
  - Mountain Warfare Training Camp Michael Monsoor
- Marines
  - Mountain Warfare Training Center

== Uzbekistan ==
- one Mountain Infantry Light Brigade
- Independent Special Purpose Battalion "Lynx" (Maxsus Operatsiyalar Bo'limi "Kaplan")

== Venezuela ==
- 221st Mountain Infantry Battalion "General in Chief Justo Briceño" (221 Batallón de Infantería de Montaña "General en Jefe Justo Briceño") (Note: The former 22nd Mountain Infantry Brigade ("Brigada de Infantería de Montaña") has been reorganized as a Motor Infantry Brigade and its mountain infantry training and capabilities have been retained only by the 221st Battalion and the 2205th Mortars Battery.)
- 2205th Mortars Battery (Mountain) "Colonel Andrés Linares" (2205a Batería de Morteros (Montaña) "Coronel Andrés Linares")

== See also ==
- List of CBRN warfare forces
- List of cyber warfare forces
- List of marines and similar forces
- List of paratrooper forces
