= Joint Service Mountain Training Centre =

Military training centre in Anglesey, UK

- HQ JSMTC
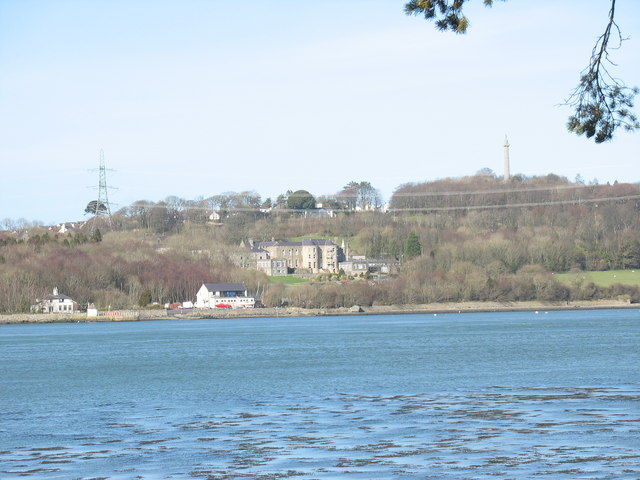
- Plas Llanfair in March 2007

- Location within Wales

General information
- Type: Military training centre
- Location: Plas Llanfair, Llanfairpwllgwyngyll, LL61 6NY
- Coordinates: 53.218°N 4.2°W
- Elevation: 20 m (66 ft)
- Current tenants: British military forces
- Completed: 1999
- Inaugurated: April 1999
- Client: Ministry of Defence
- Owner: Ministry of Defence

The Joint Service Mountain Training Centre (JSMTC) is the British military training centre for its armed forces that delivers adventurous training (AT).

== History ==
Adventurous training across all three British armed forces was made tri-service in 1999. The site opened in April 1999. An indoor climbing centre was added in July 2000.

== Function ==
It supplies parts of the Armed Forces Adventurous Training Scheme (AFATS) for Joint Service Adventurous Training (JSAT). Since 2014, adventurous training instructors have been trained at the site (Joint Service Adventurous Training Instructors, or JSATI).

== Structure ==
The site is situated around a half-mile west of the Britannia Bridge, off the A4080. Llanfairpwll railway station is nearby, to the west. A 400 kV transmission line crosses east–west, close by to the north. The Army Mountaineering Association is headquartered at the site.

Adventurous Training is the responsibility of the Adventurous Training Group (ATG).

=== Other sites ===
- Army Adventure Training Bavaria (JSMTC Bavaria), has skiing at its Alpine Training Centre (ATC) in Oberstdorf in the Allgäu Alps
- JSMTC Ballachulish
- JSMTC Scotland

== See also ==
- List of mountain warfare forces
- Mountain Training Association (MTA)
