= NATO Mountain Warfare Centre of Excellence =

- Active: 2015 (established); 2015 (fully accredited)
- Allegiance: NATO
- Type: Mountain Infantry; Ski warfare
- Role: Military education
- Part of: (Slovenia) Doctrine, Development, Educational and Training Command (NATO) Allied Command Transformation
- Website: Official Webpage

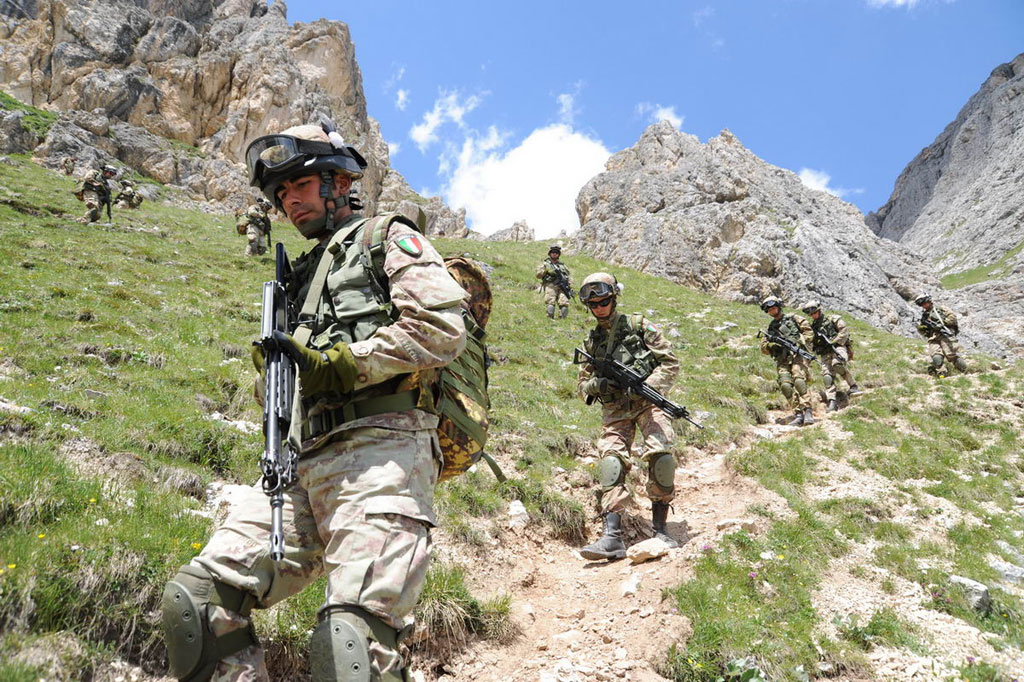
Italian Alpini from the 7th Alpini Regiment during an exercise

NATO Mountain Warfare Centre of Excellence (NATO MW CoE) or Multinational Centre of Excellence for Mountain Warfare (MN COEMW; Slovene: Večnacionalni center odličnosti za gorsko bojevanje) is one of NATO Centres of Excellence, located in Poljče, 27, 4275, Begunje na Gorenjskem, Slovenia. It assists NATO member countries, partners, other countries and international organizations, in order to enhance mountain warfare capabilities.

MW CoE was fully accredited in 2015. MW CoE activities with NATO are coordinated through HQ Allied Command Transformation. The structure of MW CoE has four branches:

- Doctrine and Standardization Branch;
- Training and Education Branch;
- Lessons Learned Branch;
- Concept Development, Experimentation and Lessons Learned Branch.

== Mission and task ==
As a hub of knowledge, MW COE develops or provides contributions to doctrines, concepts and procedures, the conduction of experiments and analyses, the provision of competence for NATO initiatives, projects, exercises and operations.

The work of the NATO MW CoE is usually initiated through a Request for Support by a NATO entity or a participating nation. The annual Programme of Work contains various 'Projects', which have a customer and defined product with a clear end date and end state, and a number of 'Activities', which cover the permanent support to NATO Transformation. Furthermore, the MW CoE plans and conducts work related events like conferences and workshops

The primary mission of the centre is "to support the transformation of the forces and assets of mountain warfare". The four core working areas are as follows: (1) education and training, (2) doctrine and concept development, (3) capability development and support to experimentation and (4) lessons identified and lessons learned processes.

According to its website, in 2012 the Centre provided military mountaineering courses including survival, climbing, rescue, guiding, combat decision-making, and small unit tactics.

It is "responsible for training individuals and units for operation in the mountains and other terrains difficult to pass".

== History ==
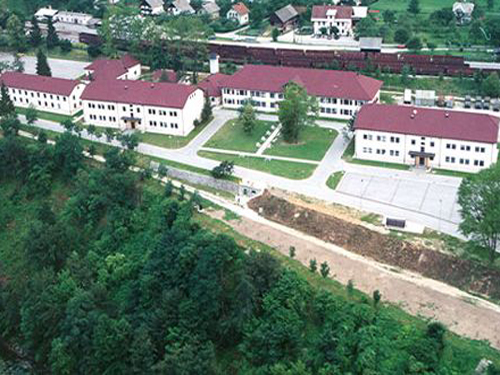
Bohinjska Bela Barracks

MN COEMW is based on the Slovenian Military Mountain School, which was formed in 1996. In 2004 the school was chosen as site of future COE.

On 15 November 2011, Slovenia (as a Framework nation) signed a cooperation agreement with Austria, Hungary, and Italy (as Participating nations) regarding training of soldiers from these three countries in Bohinjska Bela; with this, the Centre became a multinational resource. Several other countries – Germany, Turkey, Canada, and Croatia – are currently planning to apply for membership.

In 2015, the Multinational Centre of Excellence for Mountain Warfare completed the transformation processes to become a NATO Centre of Excellence.

== See also ==
- List of mountain warfare forces
- Mountain Warfare
- Slovenian Armed Forces
- Army Mountain Warfare School (United States)
- Hatsavita Mountain Warfare Training Centre (Russian Federation)
- Isonzo Front
- Allied Command Transformation
