= Structure of the Austrian Armed Forces =

This article represents the structure of the Austrian Armed Forces since 1 January 2026:

== Unit designations ==
The Austrian Army uses Jäger to denote its infantry formations. Armoured units equipped with main battle tanks are designated as Panzer formations, while mechanized infantry units equipped with tracked infantry fighting vehicles are designated as Panzergrenadier formations.

== Ministry of Defence and Sports ==
The Austrian Armed Forces are administered by the Ministry of Defence and Sports located in Vienna. The Ministry controls the following entities:

- Ministry of National Defence and Sport, in Vienna
  - General Staff, in Vienna
  - Section I: Personnel and legal office
    - National Defense Academy (Landesverteidigungsakademie), in Vienna
    - Theresian Military Academy (Theresianische Militärakademie), in Wiener Neustadt
    - Army Non-Commissioned Officers Academy (Heeresunteroffiziersakademie), in Enns
    - Museum of Military History, in Vienna
  - Section II: Sport
  - Army Intelligence Office (Heeresnachrichtenamt), in Vienna
  - Intelligence Defence Office, in Vienna
  - Geographic and Topographic Military Institute (Institut für Militärisches Geowesen), in Vienna
  - Military Real Estate Management Center (Militärisches Immobilienmanagementzentrum), in Vienna
  - Procurement and Defense Technology Office (Amt für Rüstung und Wehrtechnik), in Vienna
  - Austrian Military Library (Österreichische Militärbibliothek), in Vienna

== Chief of the General Staff ==
The office of the Chief of the General Staff commands the two operational commands of the Austrian Armed Forces and the Austrian Special Forces:

- Chief of the General Staff in Vienna
  - General Staff in Vienna
    - Section III: Preparedness - directs the Armed Forces Basis Command
    - Section IV: Operations - directs the Armed Forces Command
  - Jagdkommando (Special Forces), in Wiener Neustadt
    - 1st Task Group (1. Task Group)
    - 2nd Task Group (2. Task Group)
    - 3rd Task Group (3. Task Group) (Reserve)

=== Armed Forces Command ===
- Armed Forces Command (Kommando Streitkräfte), in Graz and Salzburg
  - Armed Forces Troops School (Heerestruppenschule), in Eisenstadt
  - Pilot and Air Defense Troops School (Flieger- und Fliegerabwehrtruppenschule), at Langenlebarn Air Base
    - Airplane Training Squadron (Lehrabteilung Flugzeuge), at Zeltweg Air Base, with PC-7 Turbo-Trainer trainers
    - Helicopter Training Squadron (Lehrabteilung Hubschrauber), at Langenlebarn Air Base, with AW169B helicopters
  - Air Materiel Staff (Materialstab Luft), in Vienna
  - NBC-defense Center (ABC-Abwehrzentrum), in Korneuburg
    - NBC-defense Company (ABC-Abwehrkompanie)
  - International Operations Base (Auslandseinsatzbasis), in Götzendorf an der Leitha
  - Command Support Battalion 1 (Führungsunterstützungsbataillon 1), in Villach (Note: a signal unit)
    - Staff Company (Stabskompanie)
    - 1st Command Support Company (1. Führungsunterstützungskompanie)
    - 2nd Command Support Company (2. Führungsunterstützungskompanie)
    - 3rd Command Support Company (3. Führungsunterstützungskompanie) (unit doubles as Cadre-Presence Unit)
    - Electronic Warfare Company (Elektronische Kampfführungskompanie)
  - Command Support Battalion 2 (Führungsunterstützungsbataillon 2), in St Johann im Pongau (Note: a signal unit)
    - Staff Company (Stabskompanie)
    - 1st Command Support Company (1. Führungsunterstützungskompanie)
    - 2nd Command Support Company (2. Führungsunterstützungskompanie)
    - 3rd Command Support Company (3. Führungsunterstützungskompanie) (unit doubles as Cadre-Presence Unit)
    - Electronic Warfare Company (Elektronische Kampfführungskompanie)
  - Jäger Battalion Styria "Erzherzog Johann" (Jägerbataillon Steiermark "Erzherzog Johann"), in Sankt Michael (Note: guards the rmed Forces Command)
    - Staff Company (Stabskompanie)
    - 1st Jäger Company (1. Jägerkompanie)
    - 2nd Jäger Company (2. Jägerkompanie)
    - 3rd Jäger Company (3. Jägerkompanie)
  - Military Police (Militärpolizei), in Vienna
    - 1st Military Police Company (1. Kompanie/Militärpolizei), in Vienna
      - Detachment (Außenstelle), in Eisenstadt
      - Detachment (Außenstelle), in Sankt Pölten
    - 2nd Military Police Company (2. Kompanie/Militärpolizei), in Graz
      - Detachment (Außenstelle), in Klagenfurt
    - 3rd Military Police Company (3. Kompanie/Militärpolizei), in Salzburg
      - Detachment (Außenstelle), in Hörsching
      - Detachment (Außenstelle), in Innsbruck
    - Training and Formation Department (Abteilung für Lehre und Grundlagenarbeit), in Vienna

==== 3rd Jäger Brigade ====
- 3rd Jäger Brigade (Rapid Forces Brigade) (3. Jägerbrigade (Brigade Schnelle Kräfte)), in Mautern an der Donau
  - 1st Air Defense Battery/ Jäger Battalion 1 (1. Fliegerabwehrbatterie/ Jägerbataillon 1), in Eisenstadt, with Skyranger 30 A3
  - Staff Battalion 3 (Stabsbataillon 3), in Mautern an der Donau
    - Staff Company (Stabskompanie)
    - Command Support Company (Führungsunterstützungskompanie; the brigade's signal company)
    - Supply and Transport Company (Nachschub- und Transportkompanie)
    - Maintenance Company (Werkstattkompanie)
    - NBC-defense Company (ABC-Abwehrkompanie)
    - Training Company (Lehrkompanie), in Weitra
  - Jäger Battalion 17 (Jägerbataillon 17), in Straß
    - Staff Company (Stabskompanie)
    - 1st Jäger Company (1. Jägerkompanie), with Pandur EVO armored personnel carriers
    - 2nd Jäger Company (2. Jägerkompanie), with Pandur EVO armored personnel carriers
    - 3rd Jäger Company (3. Jägerkompanie) (Reserve), with Pandur EVO armored personnel carriers
    - Combat Support Company (Kampfunterstützungskompanie), with sGrW 86 120mm mortars and RBS 56 BILL anti-tank missiles
  - Jäger Battalion 19 (Jägerbataillon 19), in Güssing
    - Staff Company (Stabskompanie)
    - 1st Jäger Company (1. Jägerkompanie), with Pandur I armored personnel carriers (being replaced by Pandur EVO)
    - 2nd Jäger Company (2. Jägerkompanie), with Pandur I armored personnel carriers (being replaced by Pandur EVO)
    - 3rd Jäger Company (3. Jägerkompanie) (Reserve), with Pandur I armored personnel carriers (being replaced by Pandur EVO)
    - Combat Support Company (Kampfunterstützungskompanie), with sGrW 86 120mm mortars and RBS 56 BILL anti-tank missiles
  - Jäger Battalion 33 (Jägerbataillon 33), in Zwölfaxing
    - Staff Company (Stabskompanie)
    - 1st Jäger Company (1. Jägerkompanie), with Pandur EVO armored personnel carriers
    - 2nd Jäger Company (2. Jägerkompanie), with Pandur EVO armored personnel carriers
    - 3rd Jäger Company (3. Jägerkompanie) (Reserve), with Pandur EVO armored personnel carriers
    - Combat Support Company (Kampfunterstützungskompanie), with sGrW 86 120mm mortars and RBS 56 BILL anti-tank missiles
  - Jäger Battalion Burgenland (Jägerbataillon Burgenland) (Militia; partnered with Jäger Battalion 19), in Güssing
    - Staff Company (Stabskompanie)
    - 1st Jäger Company (1. Jägerkompanie) (to be equipped with Pandur EVO armored personnel carriers)
    - 2nd Jäger Company (2. Jägerkompanie) (to be equipped with Pandur EVO armored personnel carriers)
    - 3rd Jäger Company (3. Jägerkompanie) (to be equipped with Pandur EVO armored personnel carriers)
    - Combat Support Company (Kampfunterstützungskompanie), with sGrW 86 120mm mortars and RBS 56 BILL anti-tank missiles
  - Jäger Battalion Lower Austria "Kopal" (Jägerbataillon Niederösterreich "Kopal") (Militia; partnered with Jäger Battalion 33), in Amstetten
    - Staff Company (Stabskompanie)
    - 1st Jäger Company (1. Jägerkompanie) (to be equipped with Pandur EVO armored personnel carriers)
    - 2nd Jäger Company (2. Jägerkompanie) (to be equipped with Pandur EVO armored personnel carriers)
    - 3rd Jäger Company (3. Jägerkompanie) (to be equipped with Pandur EVO armored personnel carriers)
    - Combat Support Company (Kampfunterstützungskompanie), with sGrW 86 120mm mortars and RBS 56 BILL anti-tank missiles
  - Reconnaissance and Artillery Battalion 3 (Aufklärungs- und Artilleriebataillon 3), in Mistelbach
    - Staff Company (Stabskompanie)
    - 1st Reconnaissance Company (1. Aufklärungskompanie), with Husar reconnaissance vehicles
    - Technical Reconnaissance Company (Technische Aufklärungskompanie), with Husar reconnaissance vehicles
    - 1st armored Howitzer Battery (1. Panzerhaubitzbatterie), with M109 A5Ö 155 mm self-propelled howitzers
    - 2nd armored Howitzer Battery (2. Panzerhaubitzbatterie), with M109 A5Ö 155mm self-propelled howitzers
  - Engineer Battalion 3 (Pionierbataillon 3), in Melk
    - Staff Company (Stabskompanie)
    - Technical Engineer Company (Technische Pionierkompanie)
    - Amphibious Engineer Company (Pionierkompanie wasserbeweglich), with Pionierbrücke 2000 foldable bridges and Watercat M9 boats
    - Construction Engineer Company (Pionierbaukompanie), with Faltstraßengerät folding-road laying system and heavy construction equipment
    - Combat Support Engineer Company (Pionierkampfunterstützungskompanie), in Mautern an der Donau, with Pionierpanzer A1 armored engineering vehicles and Greif armored recovery vehicles

==== 4th Panzergrenadier Brigade ====
- 4th Panzergrenadier Brigade (4. Panzergrenadierbrigade), in Hörsching
  - 1st Air Defense Battery/ Jäger Battalion 15 (1. Fliegerabwehrbatterie/ Jägerbataillon 15), in Freistadt, with Skyranger 30 A3
  - Panzer Staff Battalion 4 (Panzerstabsbataillon 4), in Hörsching
    - Staff Company (Stabskompanie)
    - Command Support Company (Führungsunterstützungskompanie; the brigade's signal company)
    - Supply and Transport Company (Nachschub- und Transportkompanie)
    - Maintenance Company (Werkstattkompanie)
    - NBC-defense Company (ABC-Abwehrkompanie)
    - Training Company (Lehrkompanie), in Freistadt
  - Panzer Battalion 14 (Panzerbataillon 14), in Wels
    - Staff Company (Stabskompanie)
    - 1st Panzer Company (1. Panzerkompanie), with Leopard 2A4 main battle tanks
    - 2nd Panzer Company (2. Panzerkompanie), with Leopard 2A4 main battle tanks
    - 3rd Panzer Company (3. Panzerkompanie), with Leopard 2A4 main battle tanks
  - Panzergrenadier Battalion 13 (Panzergrenadierbataillon 13), in Ried im Innkreis
    - Staff Company (Stabskompanie)
    - 1st Panzergrenadier Company (1. Panzergrenadierkompanie), with Ulan infantry fighting vehicles
    - 2nd Panzergrenadier Company (2. Panzergrenadierkompanie), with Ulan infantry fighting vehicles
    - 3rd Panzergrenadier Company (3. Panzergrenadierkompanie) (Reserve), with Ulan infantry fighting vehicles
  - Panzergrenadier Battalion 35 (Panzergrenadierbataillon 35), in Großmittel
    - Staff Company (Stabskompanie)
    - 1st Panzergrenadier Company (1. Panzergrenadierkompanie), with Ulan infantry fighting vehicles
    - 2nd Panzergrenadier Company (2. Panzergrenadierkompanie), with Ulan infantry fighting vehicles
    - 3rd Panzergrenadier Company (3. Panzergrenadierkompanie) (Reserve), with Ulan infantry fighting vehicles
  - Reconnaissance and Artillery Battalion 4 (Aufklärungs- und Artilleriebataillon 4), in Allentsteig
    - Staff Company (Stabskompanie)
    - 1st Reconnaissance Company (1. Aufklärungskompanie), with Husar reconnaissance vehicles
    - Technical Reconnaissance Company (Technische Aufklärungskompanie), with Husar reconnaissance vehicles
    - 1st armored Howitzer Battery (1. Panzerhaubitzbatterie), with M109 A5Ö 155 mm self-propelled howitzers
    - 2nd armored Howitzer Battery (2. Panzerhaubitzbatterie), with M109 A5Ö 155mm self-propelled howitzers

==== 6th Mountain Brigade ====
- 6th Mountain Brigade (6. Gebirgsbrigade), in Absam
  - Mountain Warfare Center (Gebirgskampfzentrum), in Saalfelden
  - 1st Air Defense Battery/ Jäger Battalion 6 (1. Fliegerabwehrbatterie/ Jägerbataillon 6), in Landeck, with Skyranger 30 A3
  - Staff Battalion 6 (Stabsbataillon 6), in Innsbruck
    - Staff Company (Stabskompanie)
    - Command Support Company (Führungsunterstützungskompanie; the brigade's signal company)
    - Supply and Transport Company (Nachschub- und Transportkompanie)
    - Maintenance Company (Werkstattkompanie)
    - NBC-defense Company (ABC-Abwehrkompanie), in Absam
    - Training Company (Lehrkompanie), in Absam
    - Pack Animal Center (Tragtierzentrum), in Hochfilzen, with Haflinger horses
  - Jäger Battalion 23 (Jägerbataillon 23), in Bludesch
    - Staff Company (Stabskompanie)
    - 1st Mountain Jäger Company (1. Jägerkompanie hochgebirgsbeweglich)
    - 2nd Mountain Jäger Company (2. Jägerkompanie hochgebirgsbeweglich), in Landeck
    - 3rd Mountain Jäger Company (3. Jägerkompanie hochgebirgsbeweglich) (Reserve), in Landeck
    - Combat Support Company (Kampfunterstützungskompanie), with sGrW 86 120mm mortars and RBS 56 BILL anti-tank missiles
  - Jäger Battalion 24 (Jägerbataillon 24), in Lienz
    - Staff Company (Stabskompanie)
    - 1st Mountain Jäger Company (1. Jägerkompanie hochgebirgsbeweglich)
    - 2nd Mountain Jäger Company (2. Jägerkompanie hochgebirgsbeweglich), in St. Johann in Tirol
    - 3rd Mountain Jäger Company (3. Jägerkompanie hochgebirgsbeweglich) (Reserve), in St. Johann in Tirol
    - Combat Support Company (Kampfunterstützungskompanie), with sGrW 86 120mm mortars and RBS 56 BILL anti-tank missiles
  - Jäger Battalion 26 (Jägerbataillon 26), in Spittal an der Drau
    - Staff Company (Stabskompanie)
    - 1st Mountain Jäger Company (1. Jägerkompanie hochgebirgsbeweglich)
    - 2nd Mountain Jäger Company (2. Jägerkompanie hochgebirgsbeweglich)
    - 3rd Mountain Jäger Company (3. Jägerkompanie hochgebirgsbeweglich) (Reserve)
    - Combat Support Company (Kampfunterstützungskompanie), with sGrW 86 120mm mortars and RBS 56 BILL anti-tank missiles
  - Jäger Battalion Vorarlberg (Jägerbataillon Vorarlberg) (Militia; partnered with Jäger Battalion 23), in Bregenz
    - Staff Company (Stabskompanie)
    - 1st Jäger Company (1. Jägerkompanie)
    - 2nd Jäger Company (2. Jägerkompanie)
    - 3rd Jäger Company (3. Jägerkompanie)
    - Combat Support Company (Kampfunterstützungskompanie), with sGrW 86 120mm mortars and RBS 56 BILL anti-tank missiles
  - Jäger Battalion Tyrol (Jägerbataillon Tirol) (Militia; partnered with Jäger Battalion 24), in Absam
    - Staff Company (Stabskompanie)
    - 1st Jäger Company (1. Jägerkompanie)
    - 2nd Jäger Company (2. Jägerkompanie)
    - 3rd Jäger Company (3. Jägerkompanie)
    - Combat Support Company (Kampfunterstützungskompanie), with sGrW 86 120mm mortars and RBS 56 BILL anti-tank missiles
  - Engineer Battalion 2 (Pionierbataillon 2), in Wals-Siezenheim
    - Staff Company (Stabskompanie)
    - Mountain Engineer Company (Pionierkompanie (gebirgsbeweglich)), in Schwaz, with Pionierbrücke 2000 foldable bridges and Material ropeways
    - Technical Engineer Company (Technische Pionierkompanie)
    - Construction Engineer Company (Pionierbaukompanie), with heavy construction equipment
    - Combat Support Engineer Company (Pionierkampfunterstützungskompanie), with Pionierpanzer A1 armored engineering vehicles
    - Field Encampment Systems Command (Kommando Feldlagersysteme)

==== 7th Jäger Brigade ====
- 7th Jäger Brigade (7. Jägerbrigade), in Klagenfurt
  - 1st Air Defense Battery/ Jäger Battalion 7 (1. Fliegerabwehrbatterie/ Jägerbataillon 7), in Klagenfurt, with Skyranger 30 A3
  - Staff Battalion 7 (Stabsbataillon 7), in Klagenfurt
    - Staff Company (Stabskompanie)
    - Command Support Company (Führungsunterstützungskompanie; the brigade's signal company)
    - Supply and Transport Company (Nachschub- und Transportkompanie)
    - Maintenance Company (Werkstattkompanie)
    - NBC-defense Company (ABC-Abwehrkompanie), in Graz
    - Training Company (Lehrkompanie), in Bleiburg
  - Jäger Battalion 12 (Jägerbataillon 12), in Amstetten
    - Staff Company (Stabskompanie)
    - 1st Jäger Company (1. Jägerkompanie)
    - 2nd Jäger Company (2. Jägerkompanie)
    - 3rd Jäger Company (2. Jägerkompanie) (Reserve)
    - Combat Support Company (Kampfunterstützungskompanie), with sGrW 86 120mm mortars and RBS 56 BILL anti-tank missiles
  - Jäger Battalion 18 (Jägerbataillon 18), in Sankt Michael
    - Staff Company (Stabskompanie)
    - 1st Jäger Company (1. Jägerkompanie)
    - 2nd Jäger Company (2. Jägerkompanie)
    - 3rd Jäger Company (2. Jägerkompanie) (Reserve)
    - Combat Support Company (Kampfunterstützungskompanie), with sGrW 86 120mm mortars and RBS 56 BILL anti-tank missiles
  - Jäger Battalion 25 (Jägerbataillon 25), in Klagenfurt, (Note: airborne and helicopter assault battalion)
    - Staff Company (Stabskompanie)
    - 1st Jäger Company (1. Jägerkompanie)
    - 2nd Jäger Company (2. Jägerkompanie)
    - 3rd Jäger Company (2. Jägerkompanie) (Reserve)
    - Combat Support Company (Kampfunterstützungskompanie), with sGrW 86 120mm mortars and RBS 56 BILL anti-tank missiles
  - Jäger Battalion Upper Austria (Jägerbataillon Oberösterreich) (Militia; partnered with Jäger Battalion 12), in Hörsching
    - Staff Company (Stabskompanie)
    - 1st Jäger Company (1. Jägerkompanie)
    - 2nd Jäger Company (2. Jägerkompanie)
    - 3rd Jäger Company (3. Jägerkompanie)
    - Combat Support Company (Kampfunterstützungskompanie), with sGrW 86 120mm mortars and RBS 56 BILL anti-tank missiles
  - Jäger Battalion Carinthia (Jägerbataillon Kärnten) (Militia; partnered with Jäger Battalion 25), in Klagenfurt
    - Staff Company (Stabskompanie)
    - 1st Jäger Company (1. Jägerkompanie)
    - 2nd Jäger Company (2. Jägerkompanie)
    - 3rd Jäger Company (3. Jägerkompanie)
    - Combat Support Company (Kampfunterstützungskompanie), with sGrW 86 120mm mortars and RBS 56 BILL anti-tank missiles
  - Reconnaissance and Artillery Battalion 7 (Aufklärungs- und Artilleriebataillon 7), in Feldbach
    - Staff Company (Stabskompanie)
    - 1st Reconnaissance Company (1. Aufklärungskompanie), with Husar reconnaissance vehicles
    - Technical Reconnaissance Company (Technische Aufklärungskompanie)
    - 1st armored Howitzer Battery (1. Panzerhaubitzbatterie), with M109 A5Ö 155 mm self-propelled howitzers
    - 2nd armored Howitzer Battery (2. Panzerhaubitzbatterie), with M109 A5Ö 155mm self-propelled howitzers
  - Engineer Battalion 1 (Pionierbataillon 1), in Villach
    - Staff Company (Stabskompanie)
    - Technical Engineer Company (Technische Pionierkompanie)
    - Construction Engineer Company (Pionierbaukompanie), with Faltstraßengerät folding-road laying system and heavy construction equipment
    - Combat Support Engineer Company (Pionierkampfunterstützungskompanie), with Pionierpanzer A1 armored engineering vehicles
    - Engineer Company (Pionierkompanie), with Pionierbrücke 2000 foldable bridges

==== Air Space Surveillance ====
- Air Space Surveillance (Luftraumüberwachung), in Wals-Siezenheim
  - Command and Operations Staff (Kommando und Betriebsstab), in Wals-Siezenheim
    - Operations Staff (Betriebsstab), in Vienna
    - Command and Control Center (Einsatzzentrale Basisraum), in St Johann im Pongau
  - Radar Battalion (Radarbataillon), in Wals-Siezenheim
    - Staff Company (Stabskompanie)
    - Command Support Company (Führungsunterstützungskompanie; the battalion's signal company)
    - Kolomansberg Radar Station
    - Großer Speikkogel Radar Station
    - Steinmandl Radar Station
    - Mobile Radar Stations (Mobilradarstationen), with Selex RAT-31DL/M radars
  - Surveillance Wing (Überwachungsgeschwader), at Zeltweg Air Base
    - Staff Company (Stabskompanie)
    - Military Flight Management Zeltweg (Militärflugleitung Zeltweg)
    - 1st Fighter Squadron, with Eurofighter Typhoon fighters
    - 2nd Fighter Squadron, with Eurofighter Typhoon fighters
    - Air Operations Company (Flugbetriebskompanie)
    - Guard-Security and Training Company (Wachsicherungs- und Ausbildungskompanie)
    - Training and Simulation Center Zeltweg (Ausbildungs- und Simulationszentrum Zeltweg)
  - Aircraft Yard 2 (Fliegerwerft 2), at Zeltweg Air Base
    - Eurofighter Typhoon maintenance, at Zeltweg Air Base
    - PC-7 Turbo Trainer maintenance, at Zeltweg Air Base
  - Air Defense Battalion 2 (Fliegerabwehrbataillon 2), at Zeltweg Air Base and in Aigen im Ennstal, with Mistral surface-to-air missiles and GDF-005 35 mm anti-aircraft guns
    - Staff Company (Stabskompanie)
    - 1st Air Defense Company (1. Fliegerabwehrkompanie)
    - 2nd Air Defense Company (2. Fliegerabwehrkompanie)
  - Air Defense Battalion 8 (Fliegerabwehrbataillon 8), in Wals-Siezenheim (former Jägerbataillon 8)
    - Staff Company (Stabskompanie)
    - 1st Air Defense Company (1. Fliegerabwehrkompanie), in Tamsweg
    - 2nd Air Defense Company (2. Fliegerabwehrkompanie)
  - Jäger Battalion Salzburg "Erzherzog Rainer" (Jägerbataillon Salzburg "Erzherzog Rainer") (Militia; partnered with Air Defense Battalion 8), in Tamsweg
    - Staff Company (Stabskompanie)
    - 1st Jäger Company (1. Jägerkompanie)
    - 2nd Jäger Company (2. Jägerkompanie)
    - 3rd Jäger Company (3. Jägerkompanie)
  - Technical-logistical Center (Technisch-Logistisches Zentrum), in Wals-Siezenheim (Radar and communication systems maintenance)

==== Air Support ====
- Air Support (Luftunterstützung), at Hörsching Air Base
  - Air Support Wing (Luftunterstützungsgeschwader), at Langenlebarn Air Base
    - Medium Transport Helicopter Squadron (Mittlere Transporthubschrauberstaffel), with S-70A-42 Black Hawk helicopters
    - Multirole Helicopter Squadron (Mehrzweckhubschrauberstaffel), with OH-58B Kiowa helicopters (to be replaced with AW169MA helicopters)
    - Light Air Transport Squadron (Leichte Lufttransport-Staffel), with PC-6 Turbo Porter aircraft
    - Air Reconnaissance Squadron (Luftaufklärungsstaffel), with EADS Tracker unmanned aerial vehicles
  - Aircraft Yard 1 (Fliegerwerft 1), at Langenlebarn Air Base
    - S-70A-42 Black Hawk maintenance
    - OH-58B Kiowa maintenance
    - PC-6 Turbo Porter maintenance
  - Aircraft Yard 3 (Fliegerwerft 3), at Hörsching Air Base
    - AB 212 maintenance
  - Aircraft Yard 4 (Fliegerwerft 4), in Aigen im Ennstal
    - AW169B and AW169MA maintenance
  - Multirole Helicopter Squadron (Mehrzweckhubschrauberstaffel), in Aigen im Ennstal and in Vomp, with OH-58B Kiowa helicopters (to be replaced with AW169MA helicopters)
  - 1st Light Transport Helicopter Squadron (Leichte Transporthubschrauberstaffel 1), at Hörsching Air Base, with AB 212 helicopters
  - 2nd Light Transport Helicopter Squadron (Leichte Transporthubschrauberstaffel 2), at Hörsching Air Base, with AB 212 helicopters
  - Air Transport Squadron (Lufttransportstaffel), at Hörsching Air Base, with C-130K Hercules aircraft
  - Aviation Technology Logistics Center (Luftfahrttechnologisches Logistikzentrum), at Hörsching Air Base

==== Military Commands ====
- Military Command Vienna (Militärkommando Wien), in Vienna
  - Guard Battalion (Gardebataillon), in Vienna
    - Staff Company (Stabskompanie)
    - 1st Guard Company (1. Gardekompanie)
    - 2nd Guard Company (2. Gardekompanie)
    - 3rd Guard Company (3. Gardekompanie)
    - 4th Guard Company (4. Gardekompanie)
    - 5th Guard Company (5. Gardekompanie) (Reserve)
    - Guard Music (Gardemusik)
  - Jäger Battalion Vienna 1 "Hoch- und Deutschmeister" (Jägerbataillon Wien 1 "Hoch- und Deutschmeister"), in Vienna
    - Staff Company (Stabskompanie)
    - 1st Jäger Company (1. Jägerkompanie)
    - 2nd Jäger Company (2. Jägerkompanie)
    - 3rd Jäger Company (3. Jägerkompanie)
  - Jäger Battalion Vienna 2 "Maria Theresia" (Jägerbataillon Wien 2 "Maria Theresia"), in Vienna
    - Staff Company (Stabskompanie)
    - 1st Jäger Company (1. Jägerkompanie)
    - 2nd Jäger Company (2. Jägerkompanie)
    - 3rd Jäger Company (3. Jägerkompanie)
- Military Command Styria (Militärkommando Steiermark), in Graz
- Military Command Lower Austria (Militärkommando Niederösterreich), in Sankt Pölten
- Military Command Upper Austria (Militärkommando Oberösterreich), in Hörsching
- Military Command Burgenland (Militärkommando Burgenland), in Eisenstadt
- Military Command Carinthia (Militärkommando Kärnten), in Klagenfurt
- Military Command Salzburg (Militärkommando Salzburg), in Wals-Siezenheim
- Military Command Tyrol (Militärkommando Tirol), in Innsbruck
- Military Command Vorarlberg (Militärkommando Vorarlberg), in Bregenz

=== Armed Forces Basis Command ===
- Armed Forces Basis Command (Kommando Streitkräftebasis), in Vienna
  - Command Support School (Führungsunterstützungs-schule), in Vienna
  - Armed Forces Logistic School (Heereslogistikschule), in Vienna
  - Supply Regiment 1 (Versorgungsregiment 1), in Gratkorn
    - Staff Company (Stabskompanie)
    - 4x Supply and Transport Companies (Nachschub-Transportkompanie)
    - Maintenance Company (Werkstattkompanie)
  - Supply Battalion (Versorgungsbataillon) (Militia), in Gratkorn
    - Staff Company (Stabskompanie)
    - 3x Supply and Transport Companies (Nachschub-Transportkompanie)
    - Guard and Security Company (Wach- und Sicherungskompanie)
  - Armed Forces Logistic Center (Heereslogistikzentrum), in Vienna
  - Armed Forces Logistic Center (Heereslogistikzentrum), in Wels
  - Armed Forces Logistic Center (Heereslogistikzentrum), in Wals-Siezenheim
  - Armed Forces Logistic Center (Heereslogistikzentrum), in St. Johann in Tirol
  - Armed Forces Logistic Center (Heereslogistikzentrum), in Graz
  - Armed Forces Logistic Center (Heereslogistikzentrum), in Klagenfurt
  - Armed Forces Ammunition Establishment (Heeresmunitionsanstalt), in Großmittel
  - Armed Forces Ammunition Establishment (Heeresmunitionsanstalt), in Stadl-Paura
  - Armed Forces Ammunition Establishment (Heeresmunitionsanstalt), in Buchberg
  - Armed Forces Clothing Establishment (Heeresbekleidungsanstalt), in Brunn am Gebirge
  - Military Working Dogs Center (Militärhundezentrum), in Bruckneudorf
  - Informations-Communications-Technology and Cyber-security Center (Informations-Kommunikations-Technologie und Cybersicherheitszentrum), in Vienna
  - Medical Center East (Sanitätszentrum Ost), in Vienna-Stammersdorf
    - Armed Forces Hospital (Heeresspital), in Vienna
    - Armed Forces Pharmacy (Heeresapotheke), in Vienna
    - Medical School (Sanitätsschule), in Vienna
    - Health and Nursing school (Gesundheits- und Krankenpflegeschule), in Vienna
    - Occupational Healthcare Center (Arbeitsmedizinisches Zentrum), in Vienna
    - Medical Establishment (Sanitätsanstalt), in Baden
    - Medical Establishment (Sanitätsanstalt), in St Pölten
    - Emergency Medical Service (Notärztlicher Dienst), in Vienna
    - Military Medical Service (Truppenärztlicher Dienst), in Vienna
  - Medical Center South (Sanitätszentrum Süd), in Graz
    - Field Ambulatory (Feldambulanz), in Graz
    - Training Company (Lehrkompanie), in Klagenfurt
  - Medical Center West (Sanitätszentrum West), in Innsbruck
    - Field Ambulatory (Feldambulanz), in Innsbruck
    - Training Company (Lehrkompanie), in Salzburg
  - Field Ambulatory (Feldambulanz), in Hörsching
  - Demining Service (Entminungsdienst), in Vienna
  - Armed Forces Sport Centers in Vienna, Maria Enzersdorf, Linz, Graz, Innsbruck, Finkenstein am Faaker See, Salzburg, Dornbirn, Hochfilzen and Seebenstein

== Jäger Battalion Structure ==
The Jäger battalions of the Austrian Army are organized as follows:

- Jäger Battalion (Jägerbataillon)
  - Staff Company (Stabskompanie)
    - Signal Platoon (Fernmeldezug)
    - Supply Platoon (Versorgungszug)
    - Maintenance Platoon (Instandsetzungszug)
    - Medical Platoon (Sanitätszug)
  - 1st Jäger Company (1. Jägerkompanie)
    - 3x Jäger platoons (3x Jägerzüge)
    - Combat Support Platoon (Kampfunterstützungszug), with mGrW 82 81mm mortars, üsMG M2 heavy machine guns, and Recoilless Rifles 66/79
  - 2nd Jäger Company (2. Jägerkompanie)
    - 3x Jäger platoons (3x Jägerzüge)
    - Combat Support Platoon (Kampfunterstützungszug), with mGrW 82 81mm mortars, üsMG M2 heavy machine guns, and Recoilless Rifles 66/79
  - 3rd Jäger Company (3. Jägerkompanie) (Reserve)
    - 3x Jäger platoons (3x Jägerzüge)
    - Combat Support Platoon (Kampfunterstützungszug), with mGrW 82 81mm mortars, üsMG M2 heavy machine guns, and Recoilless Rifles 66/79
  - Combat Support Company (Kampfunterstützungskompanie)
    - Heavy Mortar Platoon (Schwerer Granatwerferzug), with GrW 86 120mm mortars
    - Anti-tank Guided Missile Platoon (Panzerabwehrlenkwaffenzug), with RBS 56 BILL anti-tank missiles
    - Reconnaissance Platoon (Aufklärungszug)
    - Support Platoon (Unterstützungszug), with combat engineers

== Armed Forces organization graphic ==
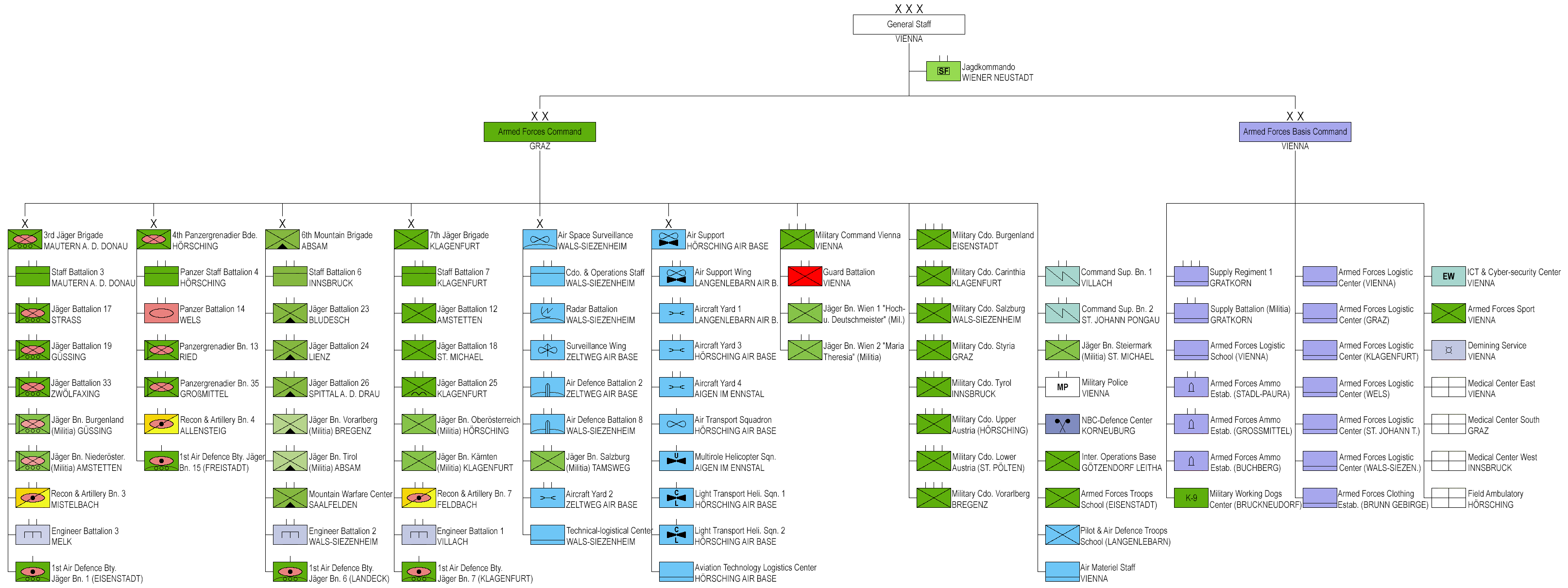
Austrian Armed Forces organization since 1 January 2026 (click to enlarge)

== Geographic distribution of operational units ==
Unit locations 2026
