= Mountain leader =

A mountain leader is a military professional specialising in delivering training for, or leading, operations in high altitude and / or extremely low temperature environments.

== Mountain leader (UK / NL) ==
The conduct of warfare in high altitude or arctic environments in the British Armed Forces is the province of UK Commando Force, a formation of the Royal Marines with a number of attached army elements. The brigade conducts annual training in the northern regions of Norway and has been deployed for high altitude operations globally.

Associated with the tasking as the lead force for mountain and Arctic warfare is the existence of the trade specialisation mountain leader (ML). Each sub-unit within the brigade is complemented with at least one mountain leader who will have undergone training in the Mountain Leader Training Cadre, formerly known as the Mountain and Arctic Training Cadre.

Marines from the Netherlands Marine Corps and special forces from NLMARSOF jointly train with the British Royal Marines and follow the same training program as their British counterpart.

== Mountain leader (US) ==
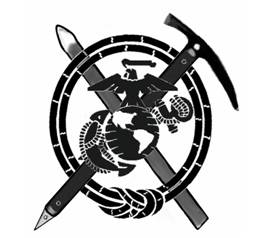
USMC mountain leader

Mountain leaders (USMC and US Army) have extensive practical experience in a variety of mountain environments in both winter and summer conditions. They have well-developed hazard evaluation and safe route finding skills over all types of mountainous terrain. Mountain leaders are best qualified to advise commanders on all aspects of mountain operations, particularly the preparation and leadership required to move units over technically difficult, hazardous, or exposed terrain. In most cases the mountain leader is the highest level of qualification and is the principle trainer for conducting mountain operations. Mountain warfare instructor experience at a mountain training center or as a member of a special operations forces (SOF) mountain team is critical to the mountain leader development. Below is a list of the additional knowledge and skills expected of mountain leaders. Depending on the specific area of operation (AO), mountain leaders may need additional over-the-snow mobility skills such as snowshoeing and skiing.

- Recognizing and evaluating peculiar terrain, weather, and hazards.
- Preparing route, movement, bivouac, and risk management plans for all conditions and elevation levels.
- Using roped movement techniques on steep snow and ice.
- Performing multi-pitch climbing on mixed terrain (rock, snow, and ice).
- Performing glacier travel and crevasse rescue.
- Establishing and operating technical high-angle, multi-pitch rescue and evacuation systems.
- Using winter shelters and survival techniques.
- Leading units over technically difficult, hazardous, or exposed terrain in both winter and summer conditions.

== Mountain leader (Italy) ==
The Italian Army mountain leaders are trained at the Alpine Training Center (Centro Addestramento Alpino) of Aosta, and serve as instructors in all the Alpini specialized mounted warfare Regiments and in the Sport Activities Unit (Reparto Attività Sportive). There are eight different levels of Mountain Leader in the Italian Army, as follows:

- Mountaineering and mountain combat military instructor (Istruttore militare di alpinismo e di combattimento in montagna)
- Mountaineering and mountain combat master military instructor (Istruttore militare scelto di alpinismo e di combattimento in montagna)
- Ski and mountain combat military instructor (Istruttore militare di sci e di combattimento in montagna)
- Ski and mountain combat master military instructor (Istruttore militare scelto di sci e di combattimento in montagna)
- Ski, mountaineering and mountain combat military instructor (Istruttore militare di sci, alpinismo e di combattimento in montagna)
- Ski, mountaineering and mountain combat master military instructor (Istruttore militare scelto di sci, alpinismo e di combattimento in montagna)
- Military Academic Mountaineer (Alpinista Accademico Militare)
- Military Mountain Leader (Guida Alpina Militare)

== Mountain leader (France) ==
The mountain leaders of the French Army are trained at the High Mountain Military School (École militaire de haute montagne) of Chamonix and serve as instructors in all the Chasseurs alpins specialized mounted warfare Regiments and in the High Mountain Military Group (Groupe Militaire de Haute Montagne). There are five different levels of Mountain Leader in the French Army, as follows:

- High Mountain Team Leader (Chef d'équipe haute montagne)
- High Mountain Detachment Leader (Chef de détachement haute montagne)
- Military guide instructor (Moniteur guide militaire)
- Army technician superior qualification - Mountain (Brevet supérieur de technicien de l'armée de terre - Montagne)
- High mountain leader qualification (Brevet de guide de haute montagne)

== Other countries ==
Some other countries have similar specialists for operating in cold and high altitude environment.

- Argentina
  - Military Mountaineering Junior Instructor (Subinstructor Militar de Andinismo)
  - Military Mountaineering Instructor (Instructor Militar de Andinismo)
  - Military Ski Instructor (Instructor Militar de Esquí)
  - Mountain Light Infantry and Mountain Rescue Instructor (Instructor de Cazadores de Montaña y Rescate en Montaña)
- Austria
  - Qualified Alpine Personnel Under High Altitude Conditions (Qualifizierten Alpinpersonals unter Höhenbelastungsbedingungen)
  - Army Ski Instructor (Heeres-Skilehrer)
  - International Rescue Specialist (Internationaler Rettungsspezialist)
  - Army Mountain Leader (Heeresbergführer)
- Brazil
  - Rope Team Leader (Guias de Cordada)
  - Mountain Leader (Guia de Montanha)
  - Mountain Leader - Advanced (Guia De Montanha - Avançado)
- Canada - Mountain Operations Instructor
- Chile - Mountain Leader (Guía de Montaña)
- Germany - Army Mountain Leader (Heeresbergführer)
- Iran
  - Mountain Instructor 3rd Grade (مربی کوهستان درجه ۳ - Merba Kewhestan Derjh 3)
  - Mountain Instructor 2nd Grade (مربی کوهستان درجه ۲ - Merba Kewhestan Derjh 2)
  - Mountain Instructor 1st Grade (مربی کوهستان درجه ۱ - Merba Kewhestan Derjh 1)
- Slovenia
  - Military Ski Instructor (Vojaški Smučarski Učitelj)
  - Military Mountain Leader (Vojaški Gorski Vodnik)
- Spain
  - Mid Mountain Military Technician (Técnico Militar en Media Montaña)
  - Mountain Leader (Guía de Montaña)
- Sweden - Mountain Leader (Bergsguide)
- Switzerland
  - Mountain Specialist (Gebirgsspezialist - Spécialiste de montagne - Specialista di montagna)
  - Mountain Leader (Bergführer - Guide de Montagne - Guida Alpina)

== See also ==
- List of mountain warfare forces
- Mountain Leader Training Cadre UK
- Mountain Warfare Training Center US
- Army Mountain Warfare School US
- Northern Warfare Training Center US
