= High Altitude Warfare School =

Specialized military training institution of the Indian Army

Coordinates: 34.291100453682155°N 75.32456900160886°E

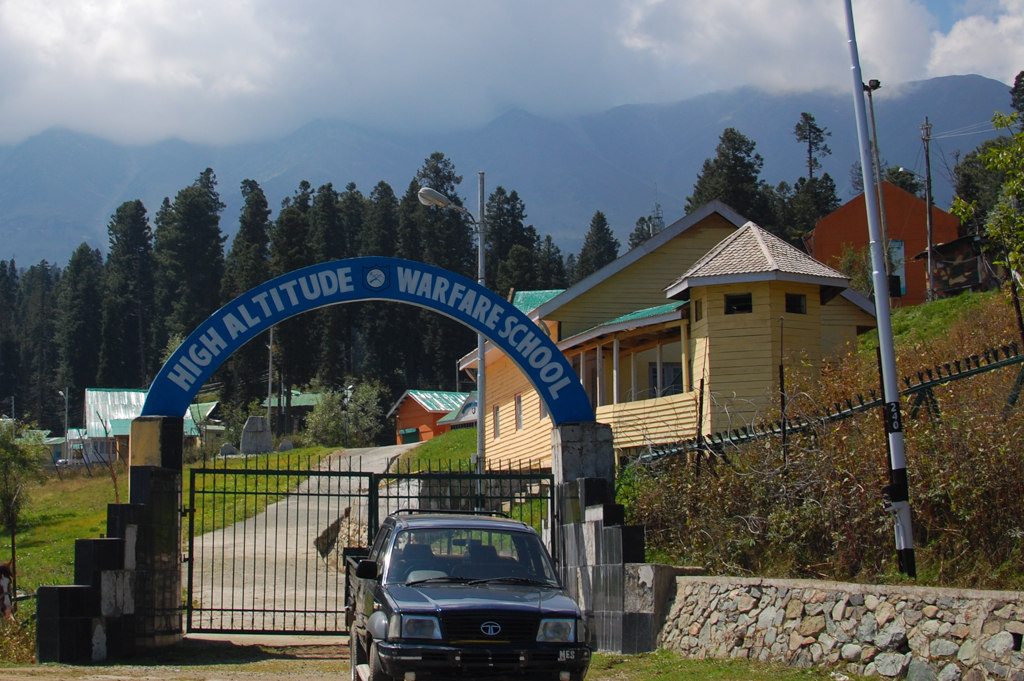
- Type: Defence Service Training Institute
- Established: 11 December 1948; 77 years ago
- Location: Gulmarg, Jammu & Kashmir, India

The High Altitude Warfare School (HAWS) is a defence service training and research establishment of the Indian Army. In 1948, the Indian Army established a ski school in Gulmarg that later became the High Altitude Warfare School, which specialises in snow–craft and winter warfare. It is located in an area which is prone to avalanches. Selected soldiers from the US, UK, Germany and other countries visit regularly for specialist training.

== History ==
The birth of High Altitude Warfare School (HAWS) of Indian Army in 1948 can be directly attributed to the loss of Gilgit-Baltistan in the Siege of Skardu to Pakistan in 1947–1948 Indo-Pakistani War. The school was established in December 1948 by General K S Thimayya, then holding the rank of Brigadier. It was initially known as the 19 Infantry Division Ski School. During the winter of 1949–1950, the school was redesignated as a Command Establishment and renamed as the Winter Warfare School. On 8 April 1962, it was upgraded to a Category A Training Establishment and adopted its current name.

== Training ==
HAWS offers two training programmes, the Mountain Warfare course and the Winter Warfare course. The former course is conducted in Sonamarg between May and October each year. The latter course is conducted in Gulmarg between January and April. The two courses train personnel in High Altitude warfare, counter intelligence and survival skills. Ice-craft is taught at Machoi across Zojila. Army personnel deployed to the Siachen Glacier and to other high altitude forward posts on the Himalayan borders go through the courses.

HAWS is the nodal instructional facility for specialised training and dissemination of approved doctrines in mountain, high altitude and snow warfare. The training programs at HAWS are open to personnel of the armed forces of friendly countries.

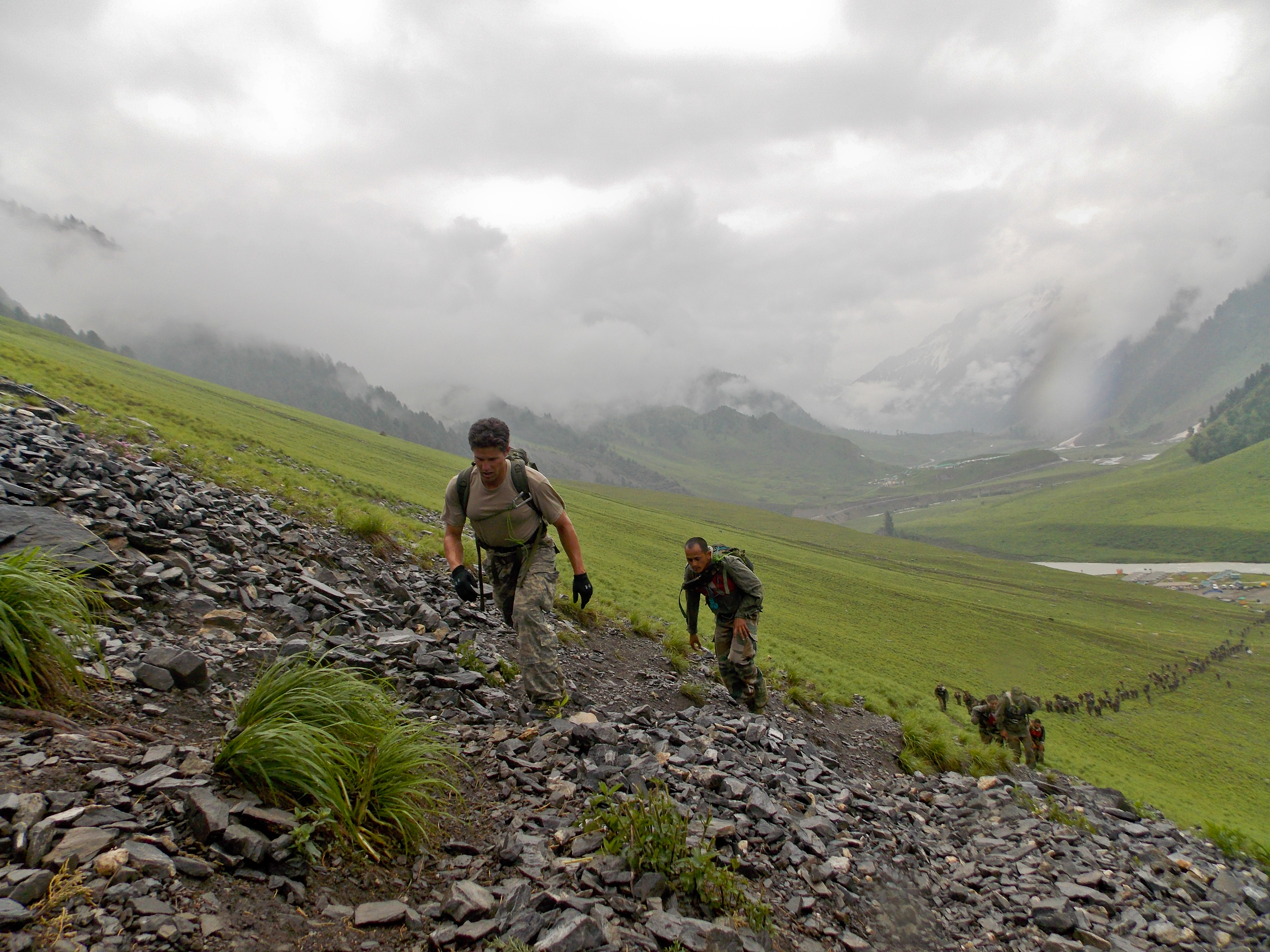
U.S. Army Capt. Mathew Hickey (left), with the 2nd Battalion, 377th Parachute Field Artillery Regiment, 4th Infantry Brigade Combat Team (Airborne), leading the way up a steep slope while on his way to winning an endurance test during training at the Indian Army's High Altitude Warfare School, 2013

HAWS also trains Indian Armed Forces personnel for winter sports such as snowboarding, alpine skiing and Nordic skiing. The school recently added facilities to allow the Indian Army ski team to train at night.

== Media ==
The Discovery Channel created a documentary series detailing the military training program at HAWS. This documentary was part of a larger series on the Indian Armed Forces, titled Veer by Discovery.

== See also ==
=== Alumni ===
- Cherring Norbu Bodh
- Jagdish Singh
- Ranveer Jamwal
- Narendra Kumar (mountaineer)

=== Of related interest ===
- High Mountain Military School, France
- Mountain Leader Training Cadre, United Kingdom
- Mountain Warfare Training Center, USA
- Army Mountain Warfare School, USA
- Mountain Warfare Training Camp Michael Monsoor, USA
- Hatsavita Mountain Warfare Training Centre, Russia
- List of mountain warfare forces
- Mountain warfare
