= Mountaineering Badge =

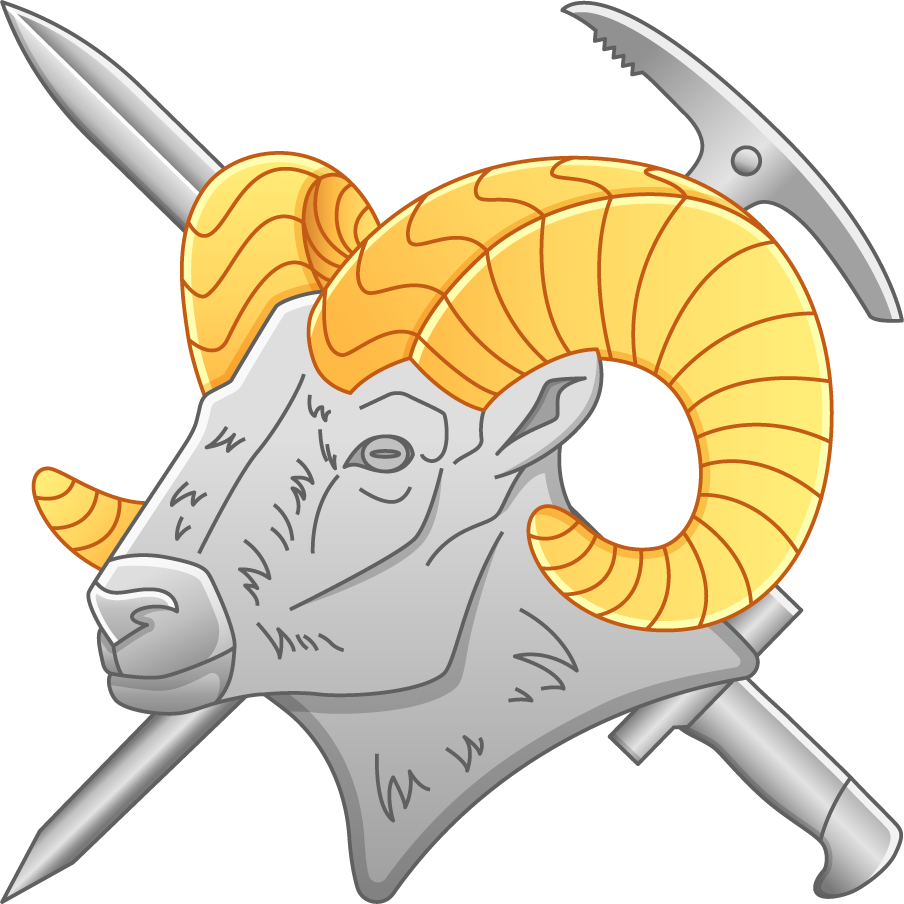
- Type: Badge
- Awarded for: Completion of the Mountain Warfare School
- Presented by: United States Army
- Eligibility: U.S. and allied military personnel attending the Army Mountain Warfare School
- Status: Currently-awarded (as the "Mountaineering Badge"); Retired (as the "Ram's Head Device")
- Established: 1983 (as the "Ram's Head Device"); 2025 (as the "Mountaineering Badge")

Precedence
- Next (higher): (Group 3 badges); Astronaut, EOD, Aviator, Flight surgeon, Rigger
- Equivalent: (Group 4 badges); Pathfinder, Parachutist, Air Assault, Military Freefall Parachutist, Space Operations Badge, Special Forces Tab, Ranger Tab, Sapper Tab
- Next (lower): (Group 5 badges); Diver, Special Operations Diver, Driver and Mechanic

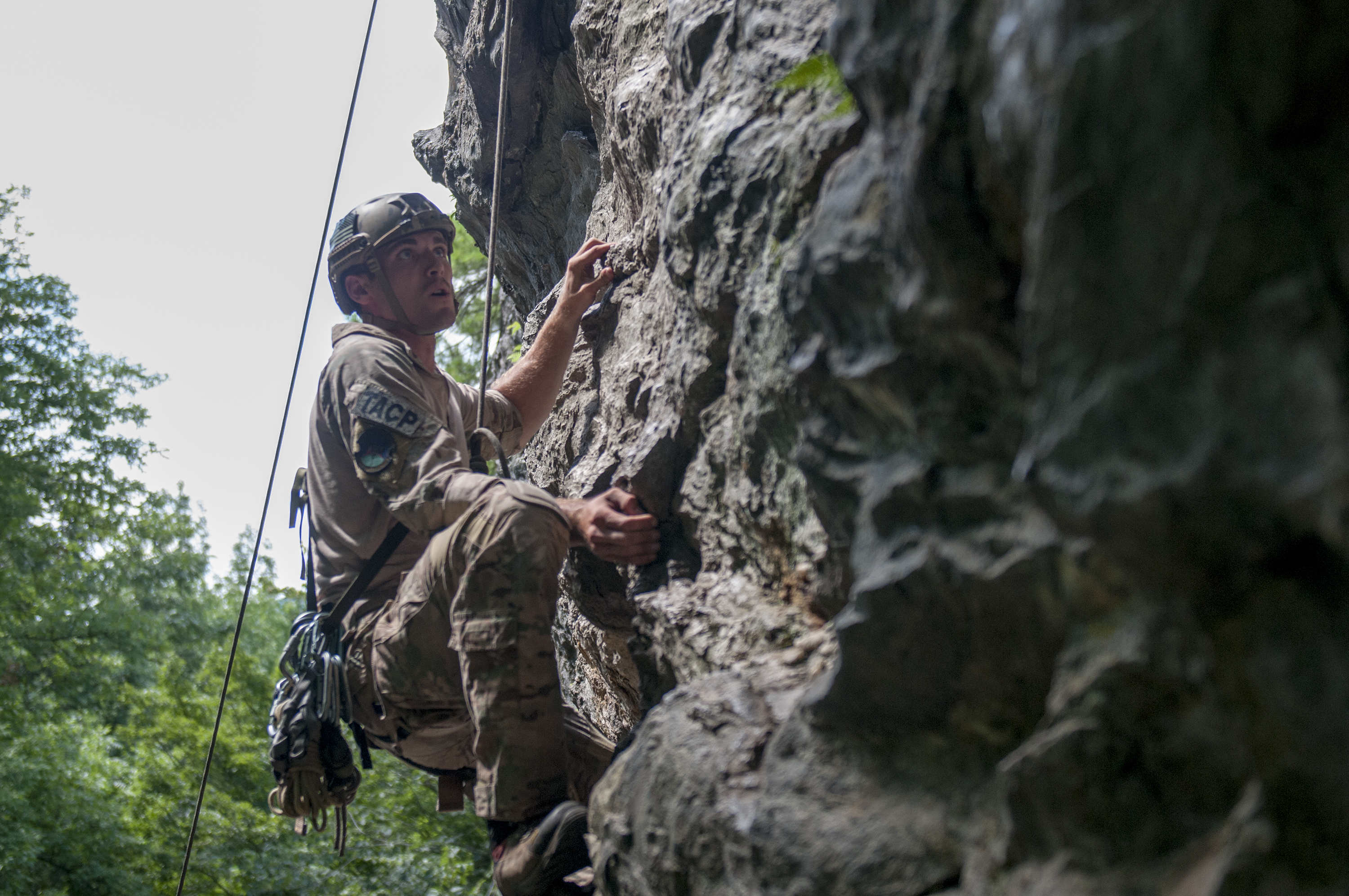
A United States Air Force TACP learns ascent techniques during summer BMMC

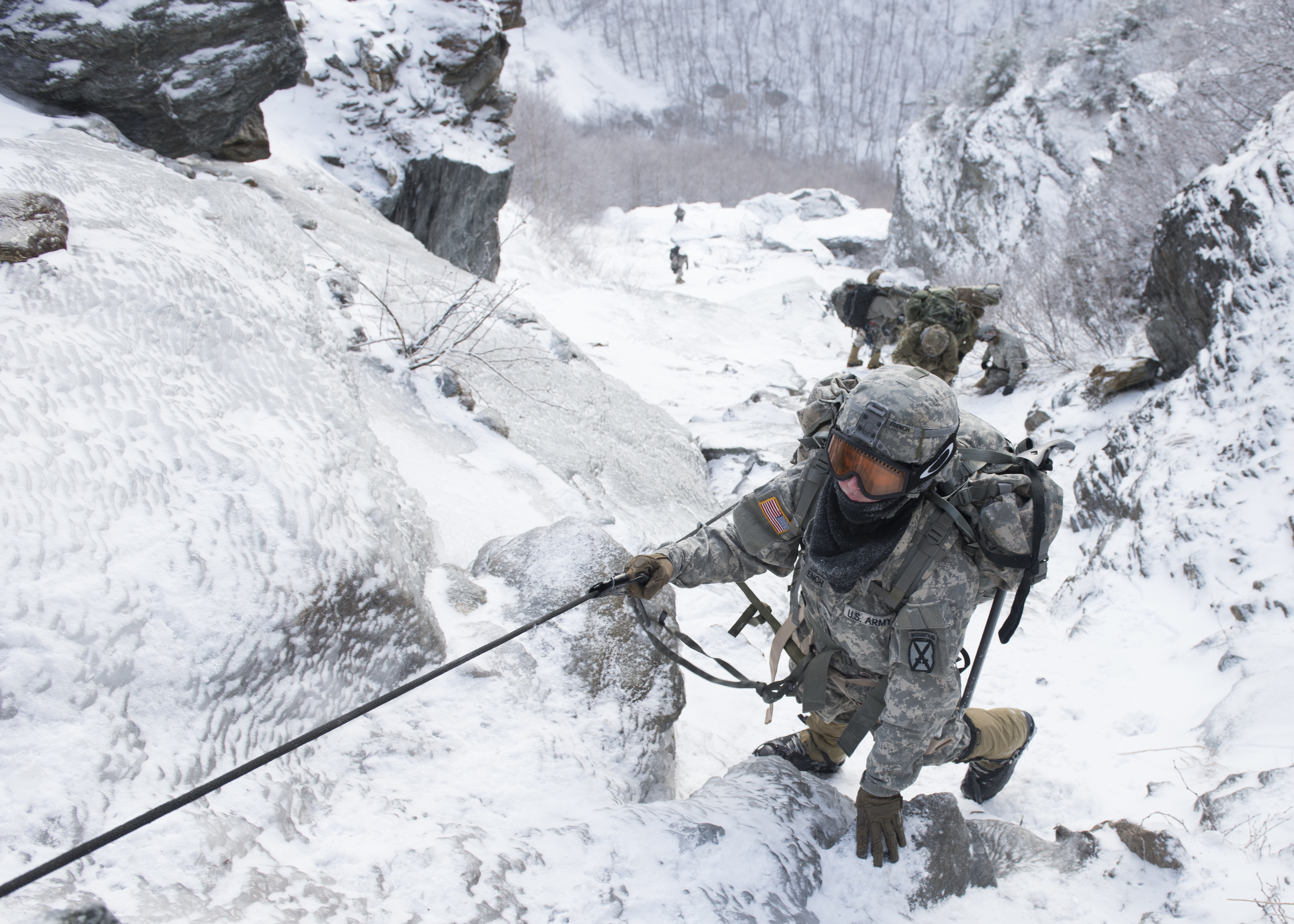
Soldiers conduct the "Mountain Walk," a culminating event for AMWS courses

The Mountaineering Badge is a Group 4 "special skill" badge of the United States Army. The badge is awarded to any service-member upon completion of the Army Mountain Warfare School (AMWS), based at the Ethan Allen Firing Range in Jericho, Vermont. The badge replaced the Ram's Head Device in 2025, which was only (officially) permitted for wear on the uniforms of New England and Colorado National Guard personnel. The new badge is authorized Army-wide and may also be worn by all personnel of the various U.S. uniformed services except for the U.S. Navy and U.S. Marine Corps.

== History ==
The Ram's Head Device was derived from the 85th Infantry Regimental crest which is topped by a ram's head symbolizing a unit skilled in mountain activity. The 85th was one of three regiments comprising the 10th Light Division (Alpine) when it was activated in July 1943. In the 1950s, the United States Army Mountain and Cold Weather Training Command at Fort Carson and Camp Hale, Colorado adopted the Ram's Head Device as the badge worn by their cadre.

In 1983, the Vermont Army National Guard Mountain Warfare School was established in Jericho, Vermont. The Ram's Head Device was adopted as the Military Mountaineer Badge denoting successful completion of the Basic Military Mountaineer Course (BMMC) and awarding of the Skill Qualification Identifier – E "Military Mountaineer." In 2003 the Vermont Army Mountain Warfare School became the United States Army Mountain Warfare School.

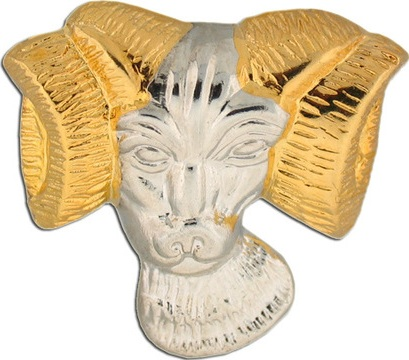
Vermont Army National Guard Ram's Head Device

In October 2024 Sergeant Major of the Army (SMA) Michael Weimer reported that the Army is "... in the process of redesigning..." the Ram's Head Device. SMA Weimer also stated that the "ram's head" is "...not going to be the badge." However, on 20 March 2025, the badge — now referred to as the "Mountaineering Badge" — was revealed to be virtually identical to the former badge, with a slight re-stylization of the ram's head and the inclusion of mountaineering tools (an M1 bayonet and an ice axe) crossed behind the ram's head. The badge is considered a "special skill badge" within "Group 4" and wear is regulated by DA PAM 670-1.

== Wear ==
The Ram's Head Device was authorized for wear on the uniform of Vermont National Guard soldiers and those Army National Guard units belonging to the 86th Infantry Brigade Combat Team (Mountain) from other states, such as:

- 1st Battalion, 102nd Infantry Regiment (Mountain) (CT NG)
- 1st Battalion, 157th Infantry Regiment (Mountain) (CO NG)
- 3rd Battalion, 172nd Infantry Regiment (Mountain) (NH NG, ME NG, and VT NG)
- 1st Battalion, 101st Field Artillery Regiment (MA NG and VT NG)

However, the device was widely worn by other graduates of the Army Mountain Warfare School, though not officially authorized.

The Mountaineering Badge, however, is authorized for wear by all soldiers completing the course. The badge is additionally authorized for wear on the uniforms of the U.S. Air Force, U.S. Space Force, and U.S. Coast Guard, as well as the NOAA Commissioned Officer Corps and USPHS Commissioned Corps. The badge is not authorized for wear on the uniforms of the U.S. Navy or the U.S. Marine Corps.

== Updated award criteria ==
When the Army Mountain Warfare School was put under the control of U.S. Army Training and Doctrine Command in 2009, only the BMMC (Summer) or BMMC (Winter) must be completed to earn the Special Qualification Identifier "E" (Military Mountaineer), not both. Also, with the updated "History of the Ram’s Head Device" document (dated 5 September 2013) stating, "The Army Mountain Warfare School continues to award the Ram’s Head Device to soldiers who complete the BMMC." alludes that completion of only one of the phases of training (summer or winter) is now required to be awarded the Ram's Head Device.

== See also ==
- Military badges of the United States
- Badges of the United States Army
  - Marksmanship badges – National Guard competition badges
  - Recruiter badges – National Guard Recruiting and Retention Badges
- Awards and decorations of the United States military
  - Awards and decorations of the United States Army
  - Awards and decorations of the National Guard
