= Mountain Warfare Training Camp Michael Monsoor =

US Navy special forces facility near Campo, California

- Part of Naval Base Coronado
- Near Campo, California in the United States
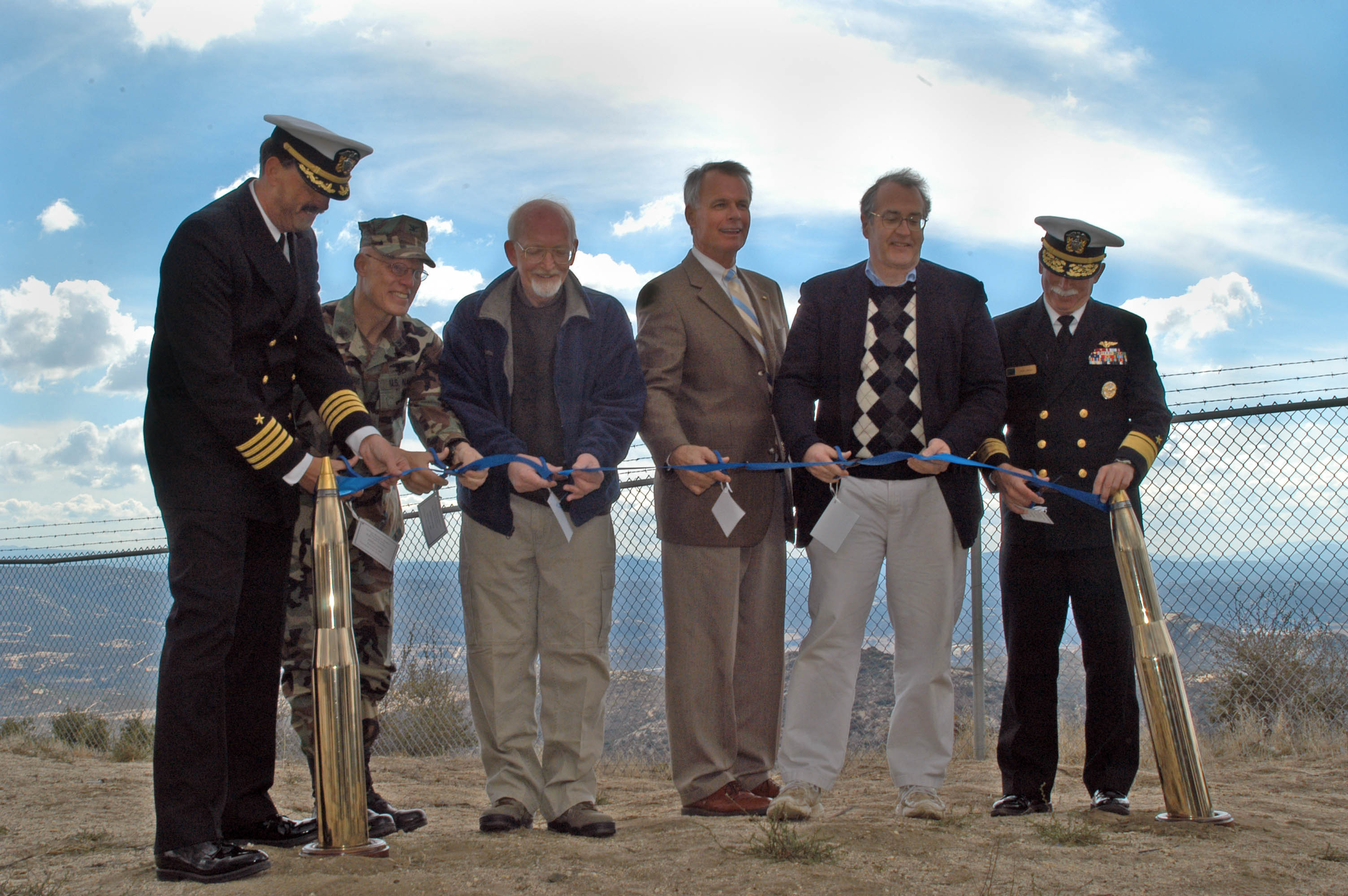
- Military and civilian personnel participate in a ribbon cutting ceremony during 2006 to commemorate the purchase of land by the US Navy at Mountain Warfare Training Camp Michael Monsoor

Site information
- Type: Military training facility
- Owner: Department of Defense
- Operator: US Navy
- Controlled by: Navy Region Southwest
- Condition: Operational
- Website: Official website

Location
- Location within California Location within the United States
- Coordinates: 32°40′04.0″N 116°26′14.5″W

Site history
- Built: 1960s (as satellite tracking facility)
- In use: 1986 – present (as training facility)

Garrison information
- Garrison: Naval Special Warfare Center

Mountain Warfare Training Camp Michael Monsoor (formerly known as La Posta Mountain Warfare Training Facility) is a training facility in San Diego County, California, used by the Naval Special Warfare Center. At 3,500 ft (1,100 m) elevation, it sits on 1,063 acres (4 km^{2}) of land 50 miles (80 km) east of San Diego, near the unincorporated community of Campo.

== History ==
The 1,063-acre (4 km^{2}) site has a firing range, an administration building, barracks, and a 5,000-metre (16,000 ft) length mountain endurance training course. The United States Navy has operated on the 1,300 acres (5 km^{2}) plus acres since the early 1960s, and is seeking to set aside an additional 4,486 acres (18.15 km^{2}) of federal Bureau of Land Management property for the facility. The Mountain Warfare Training Facility served as a satellite tracking station until it was shut down in 1986. The property was reconfigured as a training center and named for Master-at-Arms Second Class Petty Officer Michael A. Monsoor, a member of SEAL Team 3, who died during the Iraq War in 2006. He was awarded the Medal of Honor posthumously.

== Operations ==
In 1998, Naval Base Coronado gave permission for the Naval Special Warfare Command to use the site for mountain warfare training of the Naval Special Warfare Group One which trains its SEAL and SDV teams there, and conducts BUD/S classes.

The La Posta Navy Mountain Warfare Training Facility plays a critical role in military training because the area's land and terrain closely resemble the environments found in Korea and parts of Iraq and Afghanistan.

Its close proximity to most military bases in San Diego County allows for maximum training time with limited travel time and expense for its Group One. The unencumbered area around La Posta and its proximity to the Laguna Mountains makes it an ideal location for special reconnaissance training, map and compass training, and other specialized special warfare training. Camp Michael Monsoor, like San Clemente Island, is one of the few places that allow special forces to train in a real life environment with limited encroachment problems.

== See also ==
- List of mountain warfare forces
- Mountain Warfare Training Center (United States Marine Corps)
- Northern Warfare Training Center (United States Army)
- Russian Hatsavita Mountain Warfare Training (Russia)
- Mountain Leader Training Cadre (UK)
- High Mountain Military School (France)
- High Altitude Warfare School (India)
