= AMWS =

AMWS may refer to:

- American Men and Women of Science, biographical dictionary
- Army Mountain Warfare School, US Army school at Fort Benning, Vermont, US
