= Hatsavita Mountain Warfare Training Centre =

Military base in Russia

Hatsavita Mountain Training Center
- 8-й учебный центр горной подготовки специального назначения «Хацавита»
- Akhmetovskaya, Krasnodar Krai in Russia

Site information
- Type: Military base
- Controlled by: National Guard of Russia

Location
- Coordinates: 44.1973403°N 41.0274920°E

Site history
- In use: 2005 - present

Garrison information
- Occupants: GRU

The Hatsavita Mountain Training Center (Russian: 8-й учебный центр горной подготовки специального назначения «Хацавита» Росгвардии) previously known as the Mountain Training Center for Special Forces and Reconnaissance Units of the Internal Troops of the Ministry of Internal Affairs "Khatsavita" (Russian: Центр горной подготовки подразделений специального назначения и разведки ВВ МВД «Хацавита») is a National Guard of Russia training facility located in the vicinity of Akhmetovskaya south of Labinsk, Krasnodar Krai, southern Russia.

The "Hatsavita" mountain training center was organized in 2005 to increase the effectiveness of Russian Army special forces (Spetsnaz GRU) during fighting in North Caucasus Mountains, especially Chechnya and Dagestan.

== Courses ==
- The center works year-round and the training process takes 4–5 weeks. Soldiers learn the basics of rock climbing, mountain tactics, mountaineering, etc.
- Russian Special Forces training photos

== See also ==
- List of mountain warfare forces
- Spetsnaz GRU
- Alpha Group
- Vympel
- Rus (special forces)
- Vityaz (MVD)
- OMON
- SOBR
- High Mountain Military School
- Mountain Leader Training Cadre
- Mountain Warfare Training Center
- Army Mountain Warfare School
- Mountain Warfare Training Camp Michael Monsoor
- High Altitude Warfare School
