= High Mountain Military School =

Mountain warfare school of the French Army

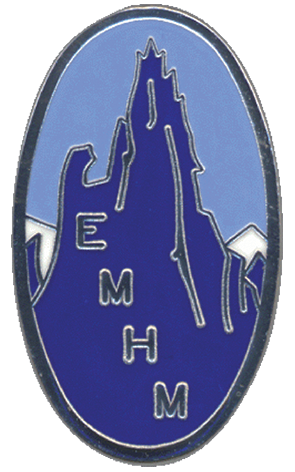
EMHM Badge

The High Mountain Military School (French: École militaire de haute montagne, EMHM; until 1964 the École de haute montagne, EHM) is a training establishment of the French Army, which trains French and allied service personnel in mountain warfare, skiing, mountain leadership, and arctic warfare. It is based in Chamonix in the French Alps.

== History ==
The École de haute montagne (High Mountain School) was created in Chamonix in 1932, becoming the world's first specialist training school for mountain troop leaders. The aims of the school were to teach mountain instructors, and to test and development of technical equipment and armaments.

In August 1939 the majority of the École de haute montagne's cadres joined the 199th Battalion Chasseurs de haute montagne, whose role was to defend France's alpine borders.

The school's mission changed in 1945 to train mountain and ski specialists for the entire Army. In 1947 the French Military Ski Team was formed, under the Commissariat for Military Sports, it was supported and managed by the EHM.

In 1948 the Chamonix Mountain Relief Society, the doctors of the School participated with the rescue team to provide emergency relief and aid in the Mont Blanc area.

The first section of volunteer NCOs were incorporated into the EHM in 1961. On the initiative of Colonel Gonnet, then commander of the EHM, an international military rally of mountain troops was created in 1963. In addition to France, the four other alpine nations (Germany, Switzerland, Austria and Italy) participated. In 1964 the EHM was redesignated as the École militaire de haute montagne.

In 1981 the High Mountain Military Group (Groupe militaire de haute montagne, GMHM) was relocated from Grenoble where it had been created 5 years prior, to settle at the EMHM.

== Brevets ==
All mountain brevets are all available in summer and winter.

- The Brevet d'alpiniste et de skieur militaire(mountaineering and military skier's certificate, BASM) composed of:
  - Brevet de skieur militaire (Military skier's certificate or BSM)
  - Brevet d'alpiniste militaire (Military mountaineering certificate or BAM)

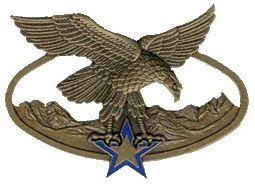
Insignia of the Brevet CEHM.

- Chef d'équipe haute montagne (High Mountain Team Leader, CEHM)
  - CEHM Summer
  - CEHM winter
    - on a technical level, the CEHM is the equivalent of the BQTM but is only intended for corporals and master corporals.

- Brevet de qualification des troupes de montagne (Mountain Qualification Qualification Certificate, BQTM)
  - summer qualification, four week course
  - winter qualification, which also lasts four weeks

- Chef de détachement haute montagne (detachment high mountain leader, CDHM, for non-commissioned officers) or Chef d'unité de haute montagne (unit of high mountain leader, CUHM, for officers), these patents correspond to the same formation
  - A summer course of 6 weeks
  - A winter course of 6 weeks

- Brevet supérieur de technicien de l'armée de terre (Senior Army Technician Certificate, BSTAT) Mountain Option
- Brevet de guide de haute montagne (mountain guide certificate)

There are then other qualifications which, although not specific to mountain troops, were created and developed within the High Mountain Military School (EMHM), including the three paragliding pilot licenses (Brevet A, B, and C) each having a higher qualification level. Example: The C-card is for all-weather solo flights, all sites, and night flights.

== See also ==
- List of mountain warfare forces
- Chasseurs Alpins
- Mountain Leader Training Cadre
- Mountain Warfare Training Center
- Army Mountain Warfare School
- Mountain Warfare Training Camp Michael Monsoor
- High Altitude Warfare School
- Hatsavita Mountain Warfare Training Centre
