= Army Mountain Warfare School =

United States Army school

Coordinates: 44.4796321°N 72.9508469°W

U.S. Army Mountain Warfare School
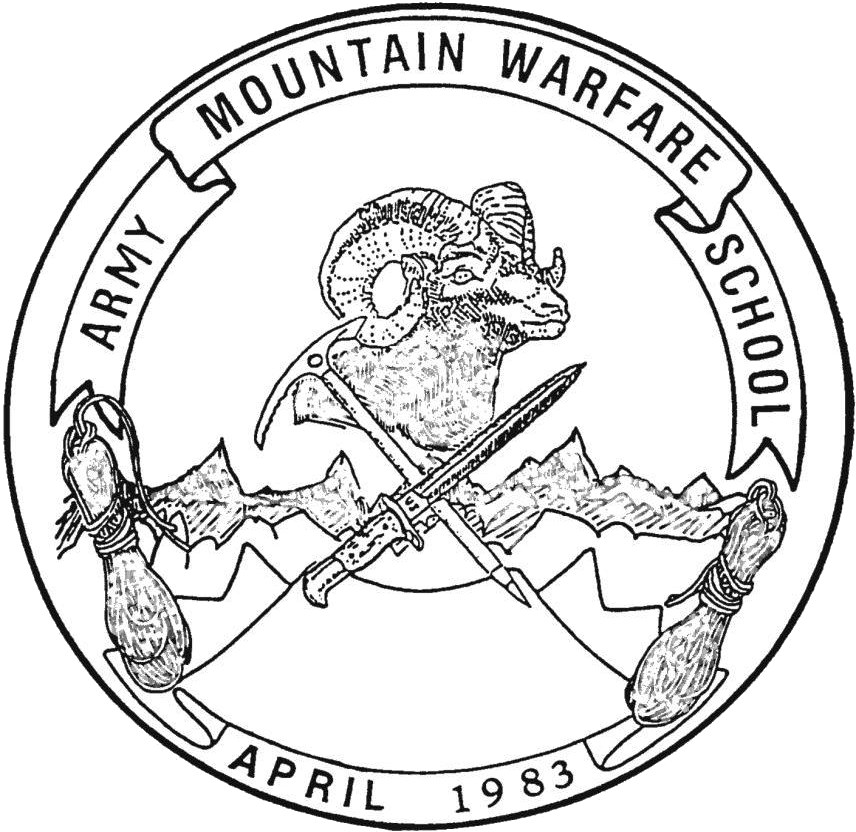
- U.S. Army Mountain Warfare School seal
- Active: 1983–present
- Country: United States of America
- Branch: United States Army
- Type: Military training
- Role: Special skills training
- Part of: Army National Guard Regional Training Institute (managed by the Vermont Army National Guard)
- Garrison/HQ: Ethan Allen Firing Range
- Website: AMWS's official website

Insignia
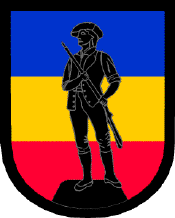
- Army National Guard Regional Training Institute shoulder sleeve insignia with Mountain Tab, worn by AMWS cadre

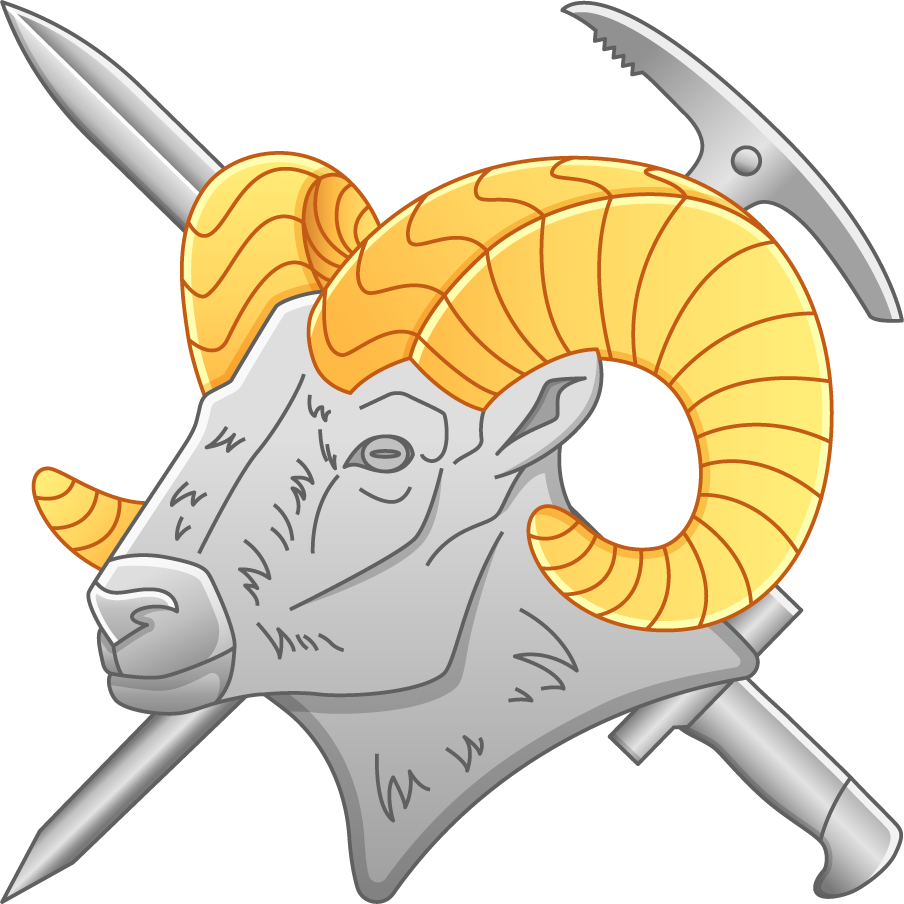
- Mountaineering Badge, awarded upon graduation (authorized Army-wide)

Basic Military Mountaineer Course (Winter) Overview (0:32)

Advanced Military Mountaineer Course (Summer) Overview (1:36)

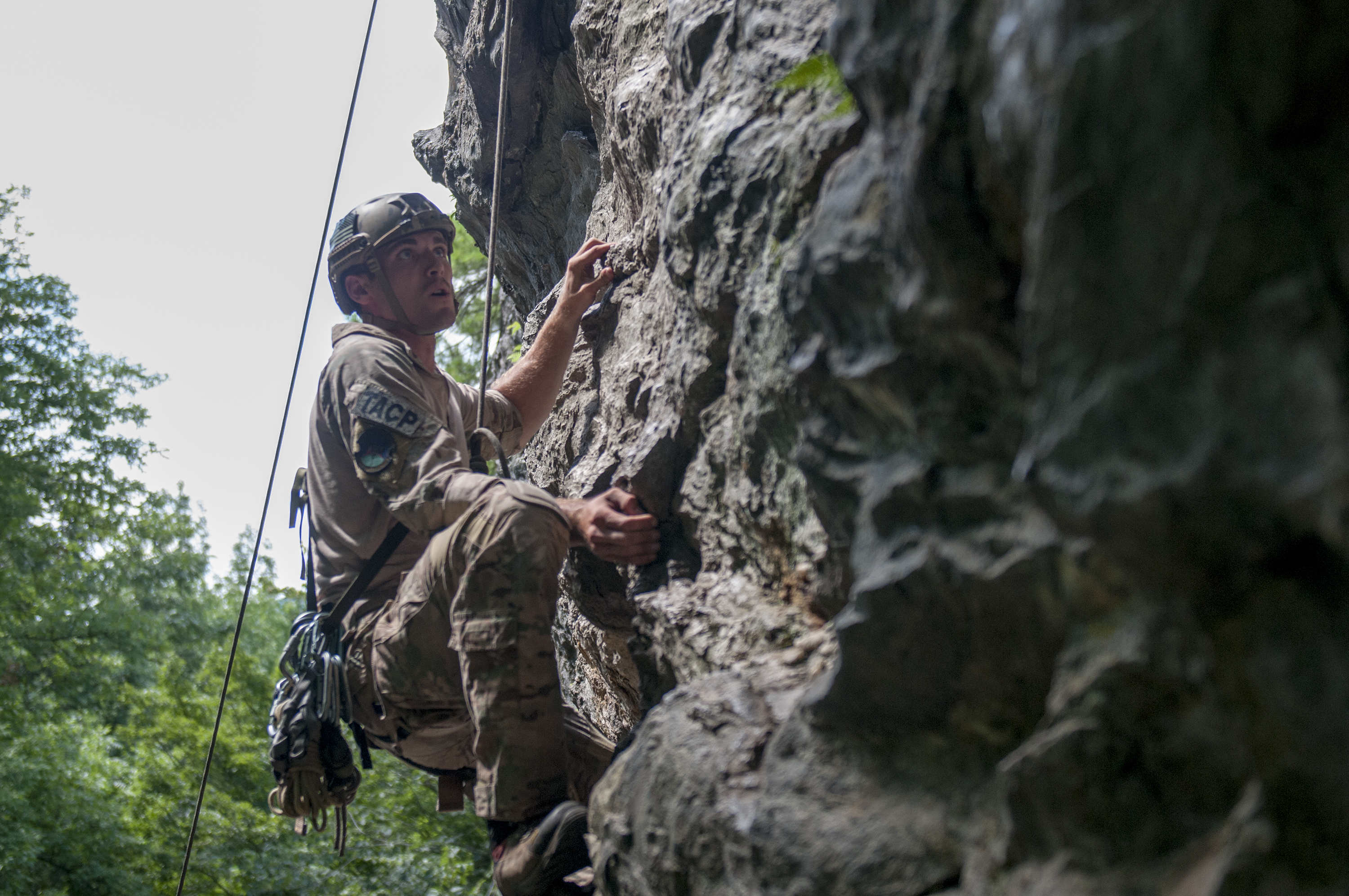
A U.S. Air Force TACP learns ascent techniques during summer BMMC

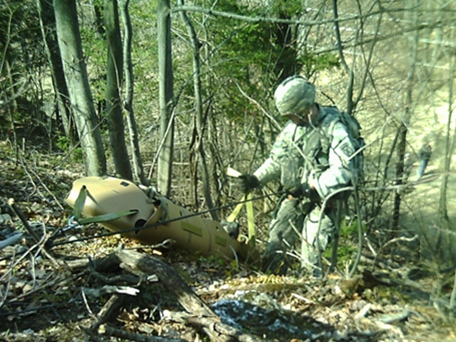
A soldier conducts high-angle CASEVAC training during the Rough Terrain Evacuation Course

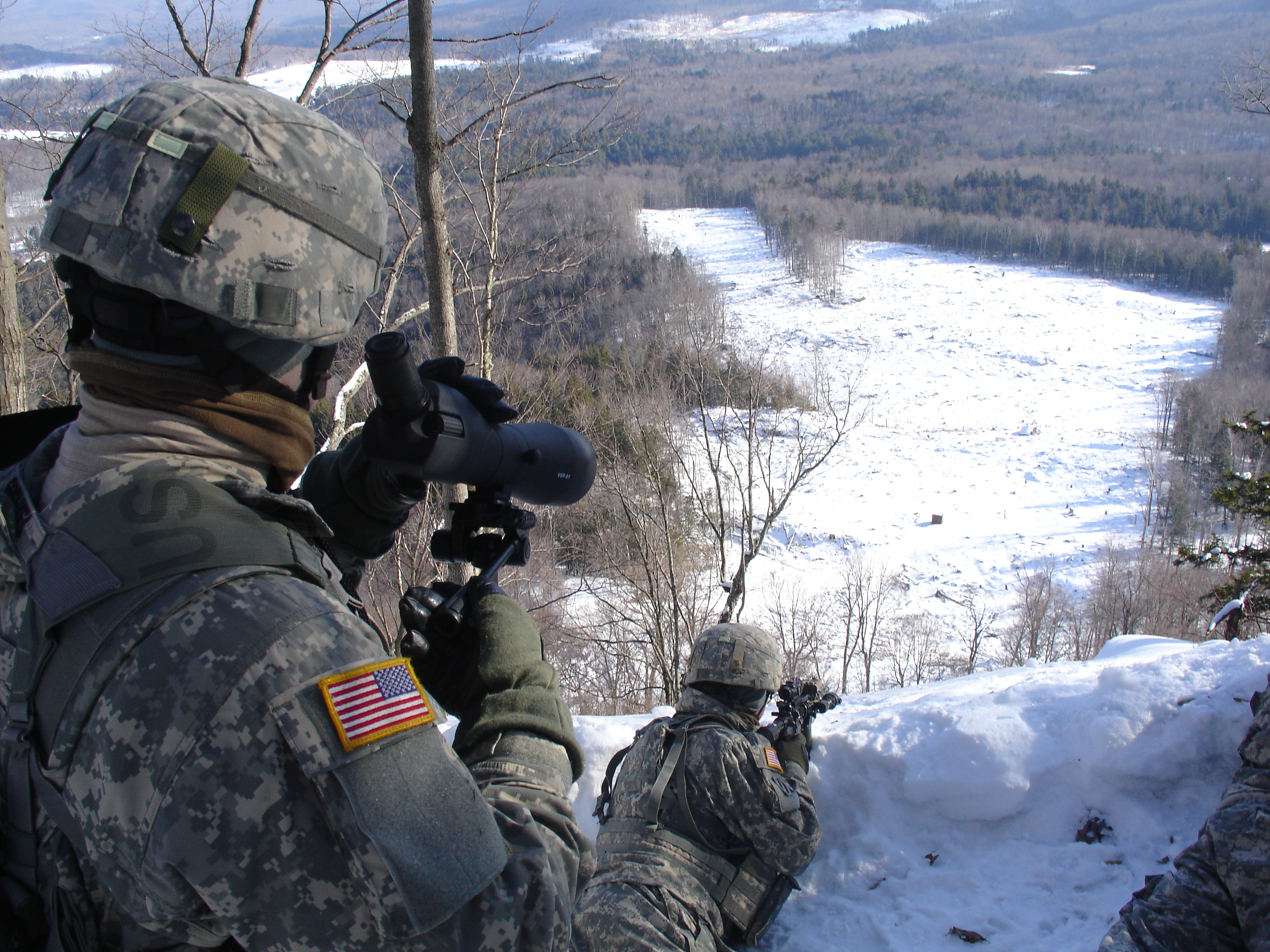
Soldiers practice adverse angle shooting during the Mountain Rifleman Course

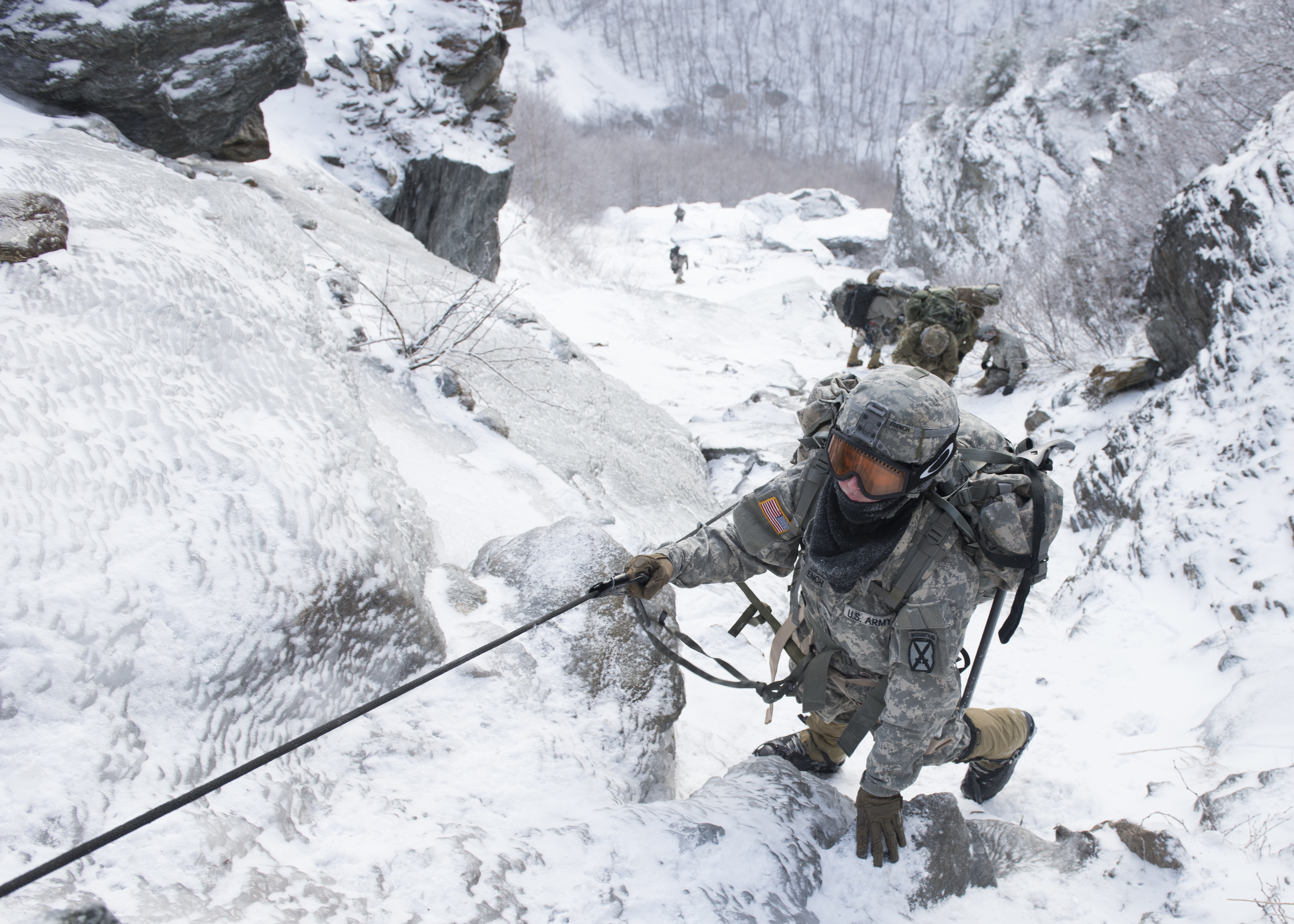
Soldiers conduct the "Mountain Walk," a culminating event for AMWS courses

The Army Mountain Warfare School (AMWS) is a United States Army school located at the Ethan Allen Firing Range in Jericho, Vermont. It trains soldiers in mountain warfare, the specialized skills required for operating in mountainous terrain.

== Purpose ==
The school teaches several courses to train soldiers of the army (including Active Duty, the Army Reserve, the Army National Guard, and ROTC cadets) in military operations in mountainous areas. Graduates of the Basic Military Mountaineer Course (BMMC) receive the special qualification identifier (SQI) of "E," Military Mountaineer.

The school runs 'summer' sessions focusing on rock climbing, high-angle tactical combat and 'winter' courses including winter travel, camping, and survival skills. The basic and advanced courses of instruction train individual soldiers, not units. These soldiers then return to their units to provide at least some training and experience in mountain warfare throughout the U.S. Army. Unit training, both at the AMWS and at the requesting unit's location, can also be provided.

== Overview ==
The school was established in April 1983 to train members of the 3rd Battalion, 172nd Infantry Regiment (Mountain), consisting of company-sized units from several New England states. Enrollment was opened over the years to include members of all armed services branches, Federal law enforcement and foreign armies. The curriculum design broadens the soldier's knowledge and the unit's capabilities. The curriculum is designed to enable soldiers to operate in the cold and the mountains and to assist in planning operations. The school uses a small group participatory learning process.

The school conducts six courses of instruction from basic military mountaineering to specialized advanced mountaineering-related courses. Each level prepares soldiers to operate in mountains year-round and in cold, snowy, and/or icy environments. The Army Mountain Warfare School is one of three institutions that awards the Skill Qualification Identifier (SQI) "E," Military Mountaineer; the other two being graduates of the Northern Warfare Training Center's BMMC—conducted by the 11th Airborne Division in Black Rapids, Alaska—and the Special Forces Advanced Mountain Operations School—conducted by the John F. Kennedy Special Warfare Center and School in Estes Park, Colorado.

The school is the executive agent for military mountaineering for the United States Army Infantry School and is responsible for the content of Field Manual 3–97.61, Military Mountaineering. It is the only non-European permanent member of the International Association of Military Mountain Schools (IAMMS).

The curriculum is structured as a two-week course, covering three main categories of mountain-specific skills: individual, small unit, and medical training. Soldiers must complete the Basic Military Mountaineer Course before enrolling in the Advanced Military Mountaineer Course. The training emphasizes equipping soldiers to support their units effectively in mountainous terrain. Basic and Advanced Mountaineering Courses are offered monthly from May to October and January to March.

It is very common for Army ROTC cadets to attend AMWS as a specialty school during ROTC. Cadets take the course during the summer, as they are in school, and training during the school season. Other ROTC summer schools include: Airborne School, Air Assault School, Combat Diver Qualification Course, Drill Cadet Leadership Training, and Northern Warfare.

This school is not to be confused with the Mountain phase of Ranger School.

== Courses ==
Basic Military Mountaineer Course: Combined both the summer and winter courses of instruction into one combined course that will cover components of each phase, depending on the time of year. The BMMC's aims to train soldiers in the skills required to conduct mountain combat operations during any climatic conditions and to award the SQI "E" upon graduation. The following are general subject areas taught during this course of instruction: mountain navigation skills, individual mountain skills, small unit mountain skills, mountain medical skills, and summer-specific practical exercises.

Advanced Military Mountaineer Course (Summer): The purpose of the Advanced Military Mountaineer Course (Summer) is to train soldiers in the knowledge/skills required to lead small units/teams over technically difficult, hazardous or exposed (class 4 and 5) mountainous terrain during the summer months. Emphasis is placed on developing the level 2 assault climber tasks described in Chapter 2 of Army Field Manual 3-97.6, Mountain Operations (2000 Revision).

Advanced Military Mountaineer Course (Winter): The purpose of the Advanced Military Mountaineer Course (Winter) is to train soldiers in the skills required to lead small units over technically difficult, hazardous or exposed (class 4 and 5) mountainous terrain during cold-weather climatic conditions.

Rough Terrain Evacuation Course: The purpose of the Rough Terrain Evacuation Course is to train soldiers in the skills to care for and safely evacuate an injured soldier over difficult terrain under austere conditions. The course combines classroom and field time with evacuation practical exercises. Many portions of the course are physically demanding as soldiers apply their newly learned skills in various medical evacuation (MEDEVAC) scenarios.

Mountain Planners Course: The purpose of the Mountain Planners Course is to train mountain leaders in the basic skills required to plan, support, and execute operations in mountainous terrain under various climatic conditions. Students are subjected to the effects of altitude/cold/terrain on: personnel, equipment, movement, patrolling, reconnaissance, fire control, casualty evacuation (CASEVAC), offensive/defensive operations, required/available equipment and its use, resupply considerations, and water procurement. Practical exercises cover CASEVAC, patrolling, patrol base operations, rappelling, rope management, and route planning.

Mountain Rifleman Course: The purpose of the Mountain Rifleman Course is to train snipers and squad-designated marksman with mountain-specific skills and angle marksmanship fundamentals. The goal is to improve mobility and lethality in mountainous terrain. Soldiers are provided with extensive shooting opportunities at both flat and angled ranges. Soldiers are taught basic mountain mobility and navigation skills. The skills are combined in practical exercises that test students' ability to plan and execute missions in mountainous terrain. The tasks taught are: mountain travel techniques, cold weather clothing, environmental injuries, soldier load management, characteristics of mountain terrain, basic mountaineering equipment, long range marksmanship in mountainous terrain, map reading in mountainous terrain, terrain exploitation, and land navigation.

== See also ==
- List of mountain warfare forces
- Mountain Warfare Training Center (United States Marine Corps)
- Northern Warfare Training Center (United States Army)
- Mountain Warfare Training Camp Michael Monsoor (United States Navy)
- Russian Hatsavita Mountain Warfare Training (Russia)
- Mountain Leader Training Cadre (UK)
- High Mountain Military School (France)
- High Altitude Warfare School (India)
