= Chhering Norbu Bodh =

Recipient of Shaurya Chakra

Subedar Major and Honorary Captain Chhering Norbu Bodh SC
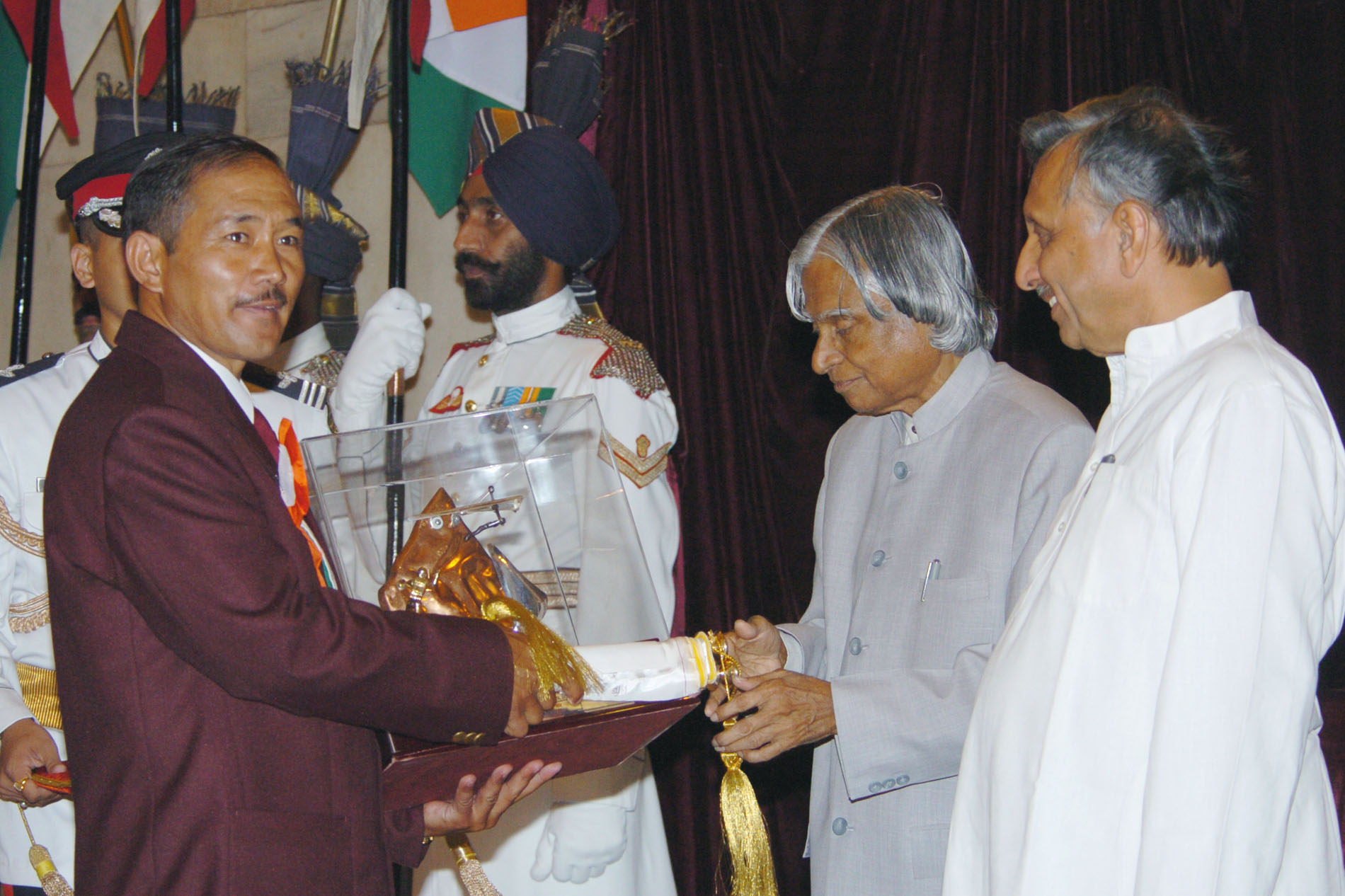
- President Dr. A.P.J. Abdul Kalam presenting the Tenzing Norgay National Adventure Award 2005, to Norbu Bodh, August 29, 2006.
- Born: 1969 (age 56–57); Village Chobrang, Lahaul and Spiti district, Himachal Pradesh, India
- Education: High Altitude Warfare School
- Military career
- Allegiance: India
- Branch: Indian Army
- Service years: 1988-2013
- Rank: Subedar Major Honorary Captain
- Service number: 3989092
- Unit: Dogra Regiment
- Known for: Mountaineering
- Awards: Shaurya Chakra; Tenzing Norgay National Adventure Award; Gold medal of the Indian Mountaineering Foundation

Subedar Major and Honorary Captain Chhering Norbu Bodh, SC, (retd.) (born May 1969, also known as CN Bodh) is a retired personnel of the Indian Army, known for his mountaineering achievements while in the army. Bodh holds a number of Indian summiting records related to 8,000m peaks. Among others, he is the first Indian mountaineer to have climbed six of the fourteen 8000m peaks in the world, and the first Indian to stand atop Lhotse and Annapurna-1.

== Personal life ==
Bodh hails from the Spiti valley, Himachal Pradesh. He joined the army soon after matriculating from school. He is known to be a devout Tibetan Buddhist.

== Mountaineering ==
=== Eight-thousanders ===
Bodh is known for having successfully climbed six 8,000m peaks in expeditions conducted by the Indian Army:

1. Mt Everest (2001)
2. Mt Annapurna (2002)
3. Mt Lhotse (2003)
4. Mt Kanchenjunga (2004)
5. Mt Cho Oyu (2006)
6. Mt Dhaulagiri (2009)

Bodh is the first Indian who summited three, then four, then five, and then six 8000m summits.

Bodh is the first Indian to have set foot on the summits of Annapurna-I and Lhotse.

=== Other peaks ===
Bodh summited Gyagar peak (6,400m) in Spiti in August 1995 and Mana Peak (7,273m) in 2000. He contributed significantly to the successful Army Women Everest Expedition in 2005.

== Recognition ==
=== Shaurya Chakra ===
In 2001, Bodh was awarded the Shaurya Chakra, India's third highest peacetime gallantry award, for successfully summiting Mt Everest under daunting conditions on 23 May 2001. The citation for this award reads as the following:

3989092 LANCE NAIK CHHERING NORBU BODH, DOGRA
(Effective date of the Award 23rd May, 2001)

Lance Naik Chhering Norbu Bodh was selected as a member of the Indian Army Everest Expedition 2001. On 23 May 2001, he was part of the second summit team attempting to summit Everest, after having spent two nights at camp – III (26000 ft). However, blizzards forced them to turn back from 27,000ft. Though exhausted by the effort, he refused to accept defeat. On 23 May 2001, at 2200 hours, he commenced his attempt. Re-entering the Death Zone on Everest above 26,000ft at night required every ounce of physical and mental strength apart from conspicuous courage. He soon started losing strength due to cold, strong winds, poor snow conditions and lack of oxygen. But he continued doggedly and at the same time kept encouraging his team-mates. At Hillary Step he was thoroughly exhausted but in a superhuman effort, he marshalled his remaining energy and clawed his way up the dangerous precipice of rock covered with verglas. His mind fought against loss of energy, numbness in fingers and toes and lack of oxygen but he made it through the step. Then with very little left in him except his mental strength and determination, he willed his body to move. Through this great effort he kept helping and encouraging his team-mates. He finally reached the summit to bring glory to the team and the Army.

Lance Naik Chhering Norbu Bodh displayed undaunted determination and conspicuous courage in the face of extreme elements.

=== Tenzing Norgay National Adventure Award ===
On 29 August 2006, Bodh was awarded the Tenzing Norgay National Adventure Award, the highest adventure sports honor bestowed by the Government of India, for the year 2005 in the Land Adventure category. This award recognized Bodh for the whole span of his achievements in mountaineering till then.

=== Others ===
Bodh received COAS (Chief of the Army Staff) Commendation Cards on Army Days in 2008 and 2010.

Bodh, a JCO in the Indian army, was made an Honorary Captain while approaching retirement, on account of his distinguished career.

Bodh was regarded among India's best mountaineers in the years when he was climbing 8,000m peaks.

Bodh is an 'Individual Member' of the Indian Mountaineering Foundation (IMF), the Government of India's apex mountaineering body.
