= Northern Warfare Training Center =

United States Army school

U.S. Army Northern Warfare Training Center
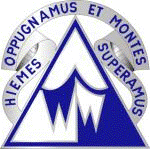
- NWTC Distinctive Unit Insignia
- Active: 1956–present
- Country: United States of America
- Branch: United States Army
- Type: Military training
- Role: Special skills training
- Part of: 11th Airborne Division
- Garrison/HQ: Fort Wainwright and Black Rapids, Alaska
- Website: NWTC's Facebook page

Insignia
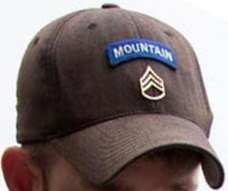
- Headgear worn by NWTC special skills instructors, known as "Black Hats"

The United States Army Northern Warfare Training Center (NWTC) is the name of a United States Army Alaska (USARAK) special skills training unit and facility located in Black Rapids, Alaska, managed out of Fort Wainwright. It is the active Army's only cold region training proponent.

Arctic, subarctic, and mountain environments are brutally unforgiving to the unprepared. Units that have successfully fought in these environments have historically been those with special individual skills, are physically and mentally tough, and have extensive experience and expertise operating in harsh conditions.

== Mission ==
According to the NWTC, its mission is "to provide relevant training to the leaders of USARAK units so that they can fight and win in demanding cold weather and mountain environments. A soldier trained in winter is also a good summer fighter; trained only in summer he is helpless in the winter!"

NWTC trains units and leaders in cold weather and mountain operations in order to increase warfighting capabilities.

- Maintain instructor proficiency in cold weather and mountain operations.
- Conduct collaborative development of Joint Forces cold weather and mountain doctrine.
- Conduct mountain and cold regions search and rescue/recovery operations.

== NWTC History ==
- Operations in cold and mountainous regions are not new to the U.S. Army. Ever since the Revolutionary War, when the ill-equipped and poorly trained Army of General Washington suffered in the cold at Valley Forge, some phase of almost every conflict in which the United States has been engaged in, has been fought in mountains or cold, or both. However, specialized training of units for cold weather and mountain warfare was not seriously undertaken until the approach of World War II.
- Training for extended operations in cold and mountainous areas was initiated in November 1941 with the activation of the 87th Mountain Infantry and the Mountain and Winter Warfare Board at Fort Lewis, Washington. Training and testing were conducted by these organizations at Mount Rainier, Washington throughout the winter of 1941 - 1942. These units were later to become the nucleus for the first cold weather and mountain training center to be established by the U.S. Army.
- While the 87th Mountain Infantry Regiment was undergoing training at Mount Rainier, plans were being made and a site was being selected for a division-sized center for cold weather and mountain warfare training. In 1942, the Mountain Training Center, with members of the 87th Mountain Infantry as a cadre, opened at Camp Hale. This was the first U.S. Army training center designed specifically for cold weather and mountain training.
- Training of the 10th Mountain Division for its future role of fighting in the mountains of Italy was the prime accomplishment of the Mountain Training Center during World War II. However, this was not the only training conducted by the Center. In addition to training many smaller units at Camp Hale, training detachments were sent to such locations as Camp McCoy, Wisconsin; Pine Camp, New York; and Elkins, West Virginia and Adak Island, Alaska to assist in the training of units in the unique requirements of mountain and cold weather operations.
- At the end of World War II, the mission of the Mountain Training Center at Camp Hale was moved to Camp Carson, Colorado. Camp Carson was the only U.S. Army Center for this type of training until 1948, when the decision was made to organize a school for arctic operations at Big Delta, Alaska later named Fort Greely.
- In November 1948, the Army Arctic School was established at Big Delta with the primary mission of providing instruction in summer and winter operations under arctic and sub-arctic conditions. This training included arctic survival, mountaineering, skiing, and solutions to tactical, technical and logistical problems in cold regions. In July 1949, the Army Arctic School was redesignated the Army Arctic Indoctrination School, with no change in the mission.
- For approximately eight years, training in mountain and cold weather operations were conducted simultaneously at Camp Carson, Colorado and Fort Greely, Alaska. However, in 1957, the total responsibility for cold weather and mountain training was transferred to Alaska. The Arctic Indoctrination School was redesignated the U.S. Army Cold Weather and Mountain School and was given the mission of developing cold weather and mountain warfare doctrine, tactics and techniques, and training individuals in these subjects
- Throughout the years as the Arctic School, Arctic Indoctrination School, and Cold Weather and Mountain School, training was conducted on an individual basis. Students from reserve component and active Army units throughout the continental United States were graduated as instructors in cold weather and mountain operations. However, early in 1963, the Department of the Army concluded that the training in cold weather and mountain operations would be of more benefit as unit training instead of individual training. Therefore, in April 1963, the U.S. Army Cold Weather and Mountain School was redesignated the U.S. Army Northern Warfare Training Center and given the mission of training individuals as well as units in the conduct of warfare in cold and mountainous regions.
- Today, The Northern Warfare Training Center is responsible for maintaining the U.S. Army's state of the art in cold weather and mountain warfare. The Center provides training in these subjects to both Active and Reserve Components and assists in the development of tactics and techniques for such operations.

== Courses offered ==
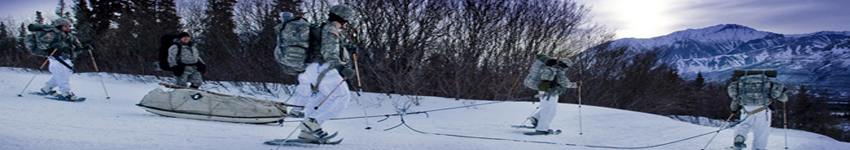

- CWOC - Cold Weather Orientation Course: This course familiarizes commanders and staff officers with the knowledge/skills required in successfully planning and conducting operations in a cold, snow-covered environment. Emphasis is placed on the effects of cold on personnel and material, effects of the winter environment on operations, and planning considerations unique to the winter battlefield and cold regions. Cold weather risk management procedures are stressed throughout the course of instruction.
- CWLC - Cold Weather Leaders Course: This course trains squad and platoon level leaders in the knowledge/skills required to successfully conduct small unit operations in a cold, snow-covered environment. Emphasis is placed on the effects of cold on personnel and materiel, use of basic cold weather clothing and equipment, winter field craft, snowshoe/ski techniques, and winter/cold regions navigation and route planning. Attendees will receive comprehensive instruction/training materials enabling them to implement basic, cold-weather and ski-training programs within their units. Cold weather risk-management procedures are stressed throughout the course.
- BMMC - Basic Military Mountaineering Course: This 15-day course trains selected Soldiers in the fundamental knowledge/skills required to successfully conduct small unit operations in typical, mountainous terrain found throughout the world. Emphasis is placed on developing the Level 1 mountaineering tasks described in TC 3-97.61, Appendix A. Graduates are awarded SQI "E", Military Mountaineer IAW DA PAM 611-21, Table 12-1.
- AMCC - Assault Military Climbers Course: This 11-day course trains selected Soldiers in the knowledge/skills required to lead small units/teams over technically difficult, hazardous or exposed (Class 4 and 5) mountainous terrain during summer months. Emphasis is placed on developing the Level 2 mountaineering tasks described in Chapter 2, FM 3-97.6, Mountain Operations (2002 Revision) and FM 3-97.61, Military Mountaineering. The course is intended for units or individuals that will conduct operations in mountainous terrain and must operate independently of major units or organizations or will lead larger organizations over technically hazardous terrain.
- CWIC - Cold Weather Indoctrination Course: To train all Soldiers, regardless of job function, in the skills required to successfully train and operate in a cold, snow-covered environment. Attendees will gain confidence in their cold weather clothing and equipment and their ability to care for themselves in the cold weather environment. Emphasis is placed on the effects of cold on personnel and material, recognition, treatment and prevention of cold weather injuries, use of basic cold weather clothing and equipment, winter field-craft, use of cold weather shelters, use of Army approved heaters, and over snow movement techniques. Cold weather risk management procedures are stressed throughout the course of instruction.
- Junior Leaders Course (discontinued): Two week basic mountaineering, plus greeley phase and river phase: geography, climate, and phenomenon of northern area of operations, living in the field, hazards to movement, medical problems, inland waterways, river training, boat operations, river charting, reading and navigation, and stream crossing.

== See also ==
- List of United States Army bases
- United States Marine Corps Mountain Warfare Training Center
- United States Army Mountain Warfare School
- Camp Ripley, United States (Minnesota ARNG)
- Russian Hatsavita Mountain Warfare Training
