= High Mountain Military Group =

Elite specialist element of the French Army

- Groupe Militaire de Haute Montagne
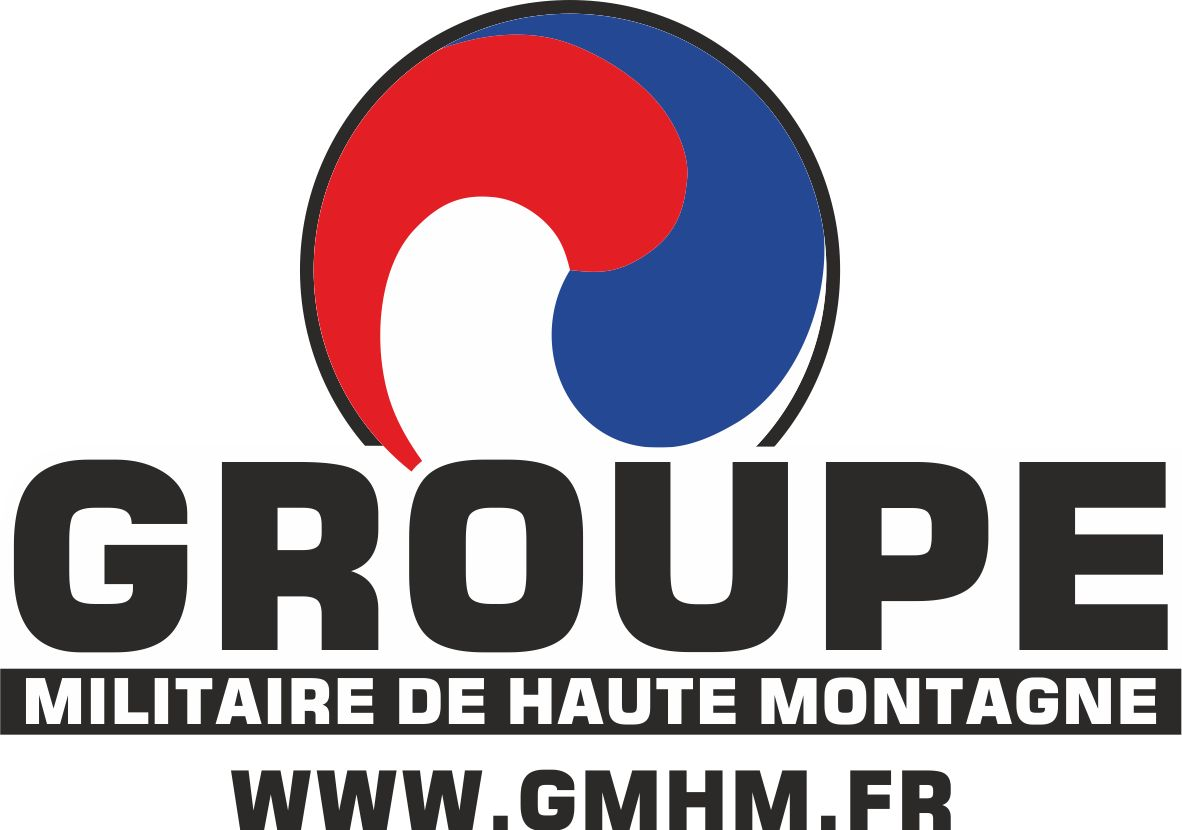
- Logo of the website of the GMHM
- Active: 1976–present
- Country: France
- Branch: French Army
- Type: Mountain and cold-weather warfare
- Role: International prestige, training and experimentation
- Size: 10
- Part of: 27th Mountain Infantry Brigade, High Mountain Military School
- Garrison/HQ: Chamonix
- Nickname: Le Groupe ("The Group")
- Colors: White, red and blue
- Website: www.gmhm.fr

The High Mountain Military Group (French: Groupe Militaire de Haute Montagne, GMHM) is a specialist French Army element composed of ten men. It constitutes the leading team for mountaineering and long-distance expeditions conducted by the French Army.

The group is also responsible for research and experimentation for operating in extreme environmental and climatic conditions. It also participates in the training of other mountain units and represents these French mountain units abroad.

The GMHM collaborates with various brands to make better equipment for the army.

== History ==
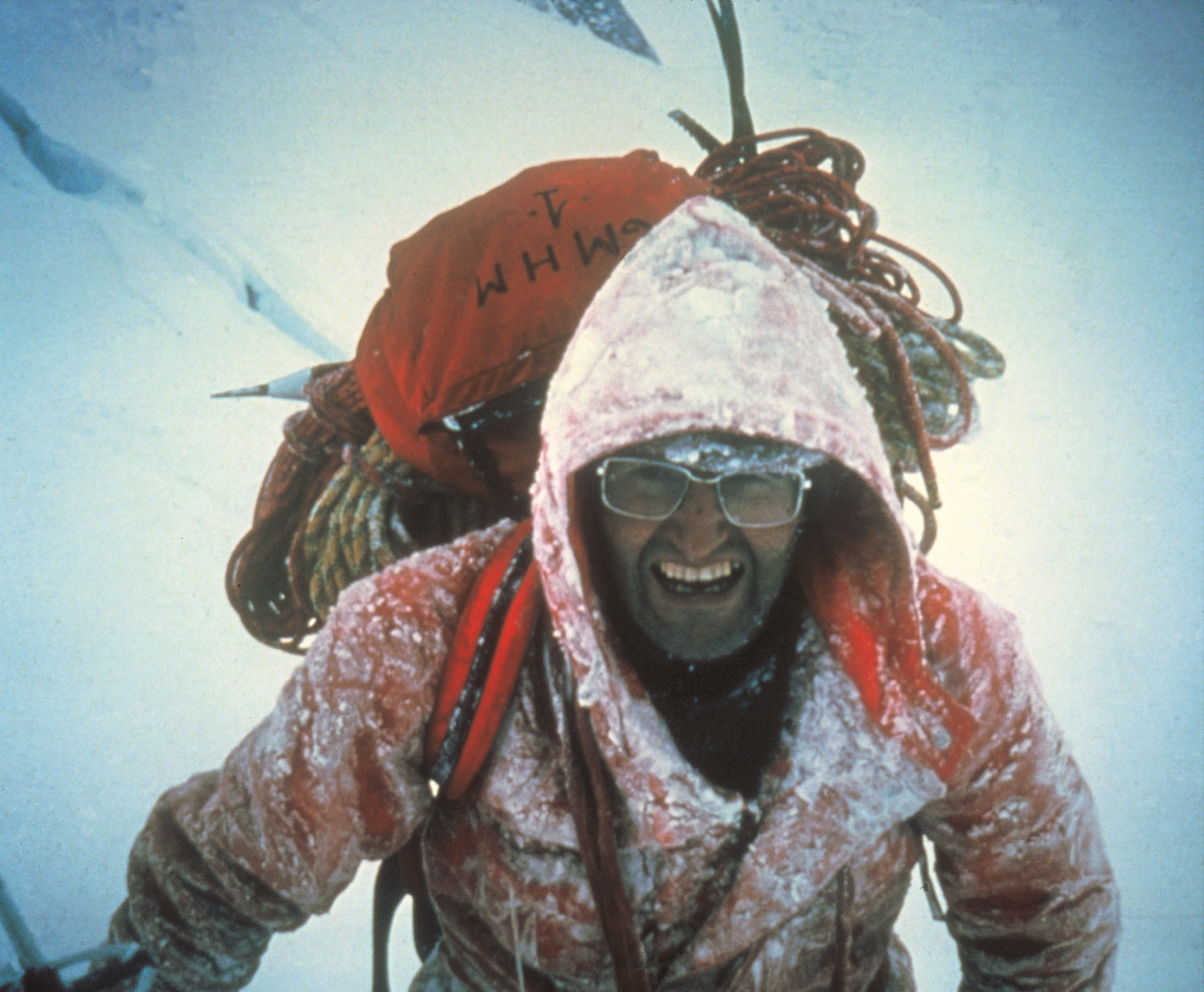
Jean-Claude Marmier, the first commander of the group.

The French Armed Forces are pioneers in the domain of exploration and adventure, especially in mountain environments. Captain Clerc of the 159th Alpine Infantry Regiment, introduced the practice of military skiing in Briançon in 1902 by creating the first French ski school. Later, in 1932, the High Mountain Military School was founded in Chamonix. It was the first national school to provide mountaineering education.

In the 1970s, General Laurens, the commander of the new 27th Mountain Infantry Brigade created a small military unit of world-class mountaineering experts in order to realize major mountaineering missions on mountain ranges around the world. He gave this mission to Captain Jean Claude Marmier.

The selection of the first men to join the unit took place in September 1976. The number of unit members is fixed to ten.

=== 1976–1986: Early years ===
Between 1976 and 1981, the group traveled the Alps to perfect the basic skills of a mountaineer.

In 1978, the group completed an expedition to Greenland in 1978 but major exploration beyond the Alps really started in 1981 with an attempted ascent of Everest from the Tibetan side. This expedition failed although they reached 8400 m. In the following years, the team accomplished ascents in Baffin Island, in Alaska, as well as on Thalay Sagar, Kamet and on the south face of Gyachung Kang.

=== 1986–1993: Capability development & experimentation ===
In 1986, Jean Claude Marmier left the command of the Group to take command of the High Mountain Group and later of the presidency French Federation of Mountaineering and Climbing. Marmier was replaced by Captain Alain Estève who was one of the first members of the group. Under his lead, the GMHM experimented with paragliding, hang gliding and free fall. In 1984, the group realized its first eight-thousander with an ascent of Lhotse. In 1992, they broke the world speed record for an ascent of Aconcagua.

=== 1993–1999: The Three Poles Challenge ===
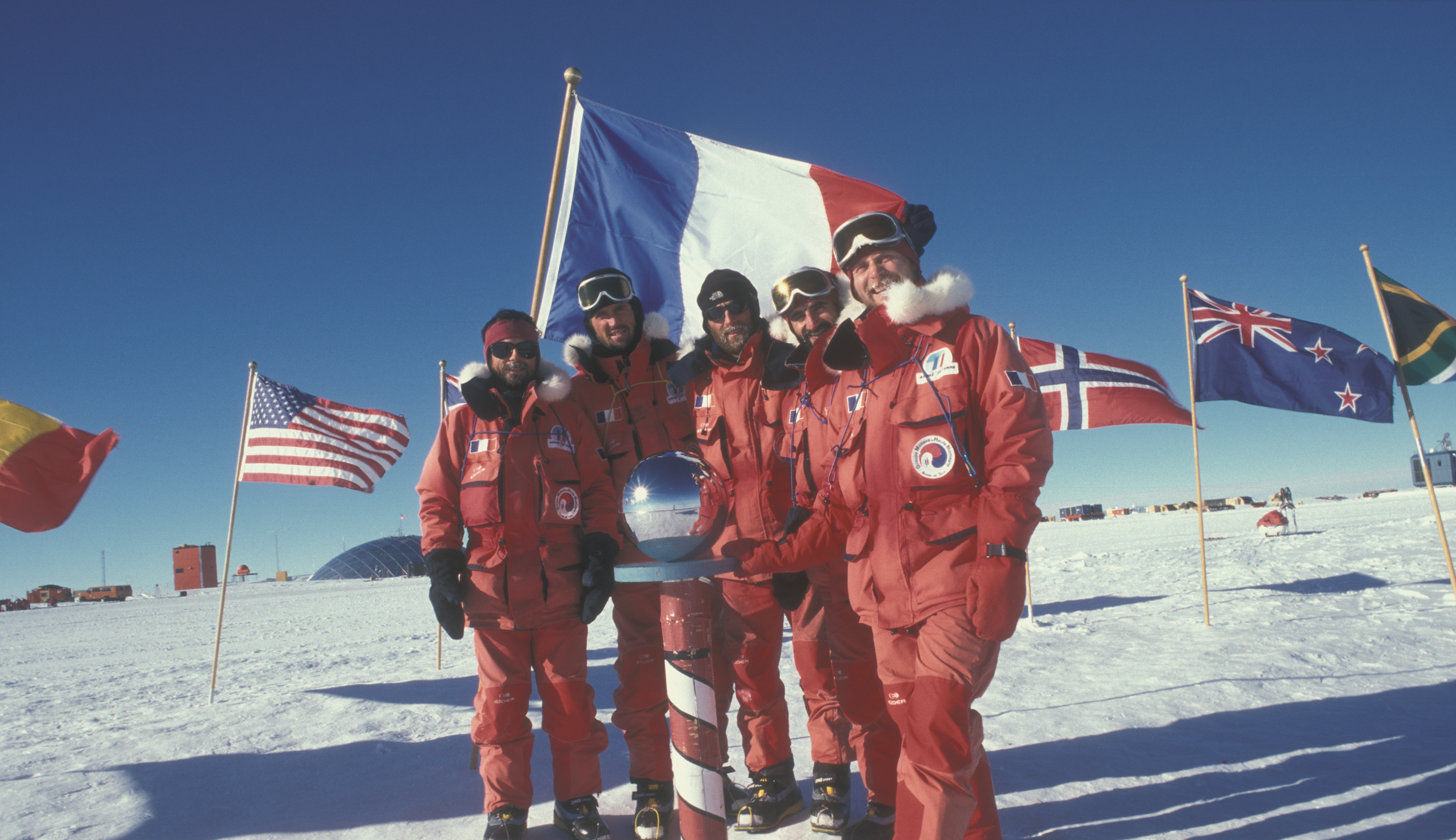
The group at the South pole.

In 1993, after ascending Everest, Alain Estève decided to continue with the exploration of the North and South poles. In 1996, they reached the North Pole after 970 kilometres (600 mi). The South Pole was later reached and the Three Poles Challenge completed in 1999 after 1,350 kilometres (840 mi). The challenge was completed without Estève, who was victim of a fatal fall in Norway in 1997.

=== 2000–2010: Return to the mountains ===
In 2001, the GMHM opened a new route in Baffin Island on a peak named after Alain Estève. They achieved the 2nd ascent of Mont Ross in the Kerguelen Islands, 25 years after the first ascent by the French Federation of Mountaineering and Climbing.

In 2002, the group made several openings in the massif of Garhwal in India (Arwa Tower, Arwa Spire, Arwa Crest) and the Minya Konka in China. In 2003, an accident caused the death of Captain Choudens and Lieutenant Renard on Shishapangma.

The GMHM went to Mali in January 2005 to open seven free climbing routes on the Hand of Fatima and Mount Hombori. Then in Chilean Patagonia, the group opened a mixed climbing way on the Hombro-Norte.

=== 2011: Sur le fil de Darwin ===
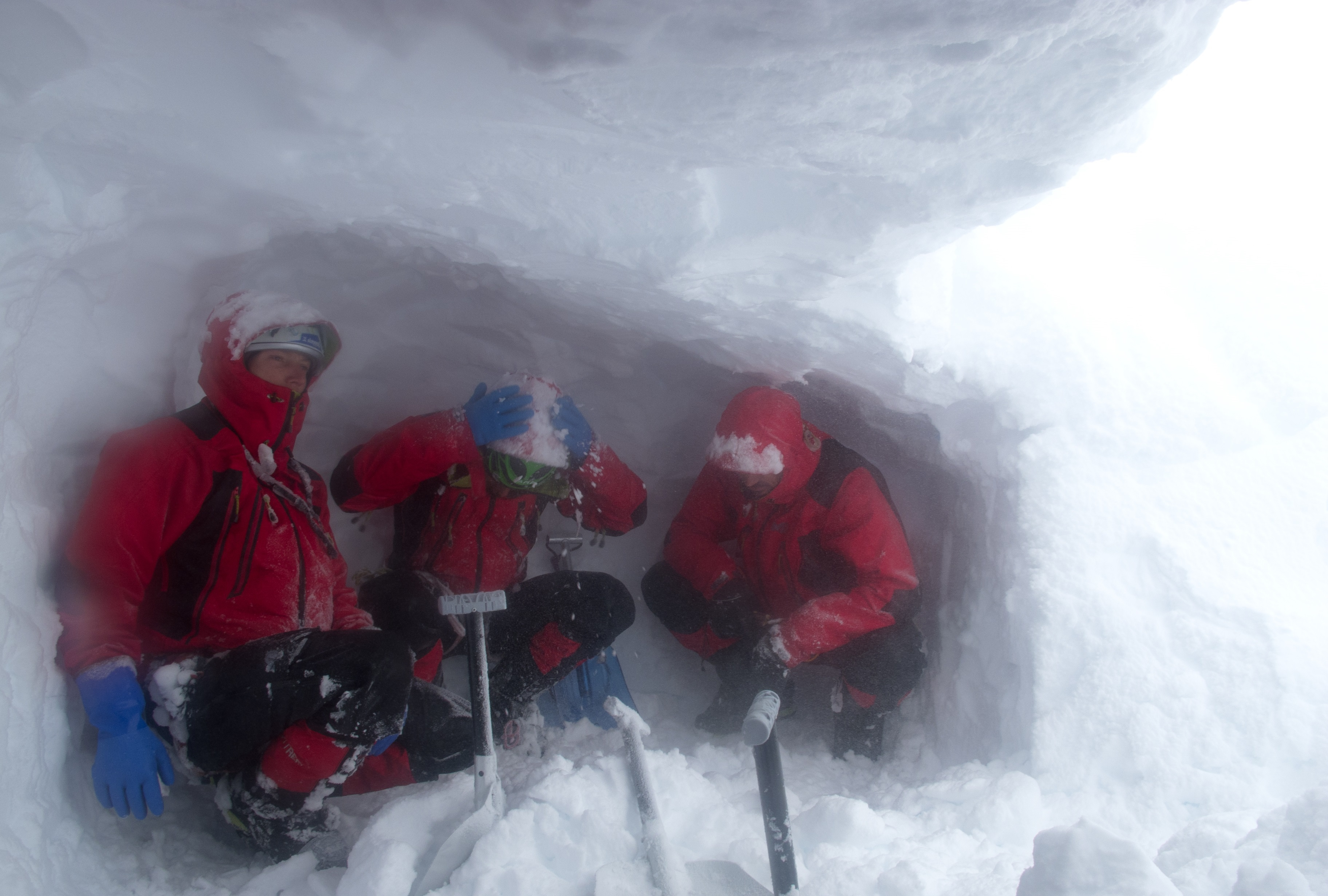
Members of the group resting during the expedition on the cordillera Darwin.

In October 2011, six GMHM members became the first to cross the 180 kilometres (110 mi) of the Cordillera Darwin and in 29 days.

=== 2012: Kamet ===
Six months after returning from the Cordillera Darwin, they returned to Kamet with a team of 4 alpinists. The group had already opened a route on Kamet with Jean-Claude Marmier. The new route, "Spicy game", was the subject of a Piolets d'Or.

=== 2013–2015: Shishapangma and Annapurna ===
In 2013 the group returned to Shishapangma, the scene of a disaster that shook the group ten years earlier. That year, bad weather and differences in motivation within the team forced a retreat. The next spring the Group returned to the mountain and successfully ascended the south face.

In 2015, the group decided undertook an expedition to Annapurna. After a long and intense training period, bad weather blocked them from successfully ascending.
