= Ethan Allen Firing Range =

Vermont National Guard installation in Jericho, VT, US

Coordinates: 44.4796321°N 72.9508469°W

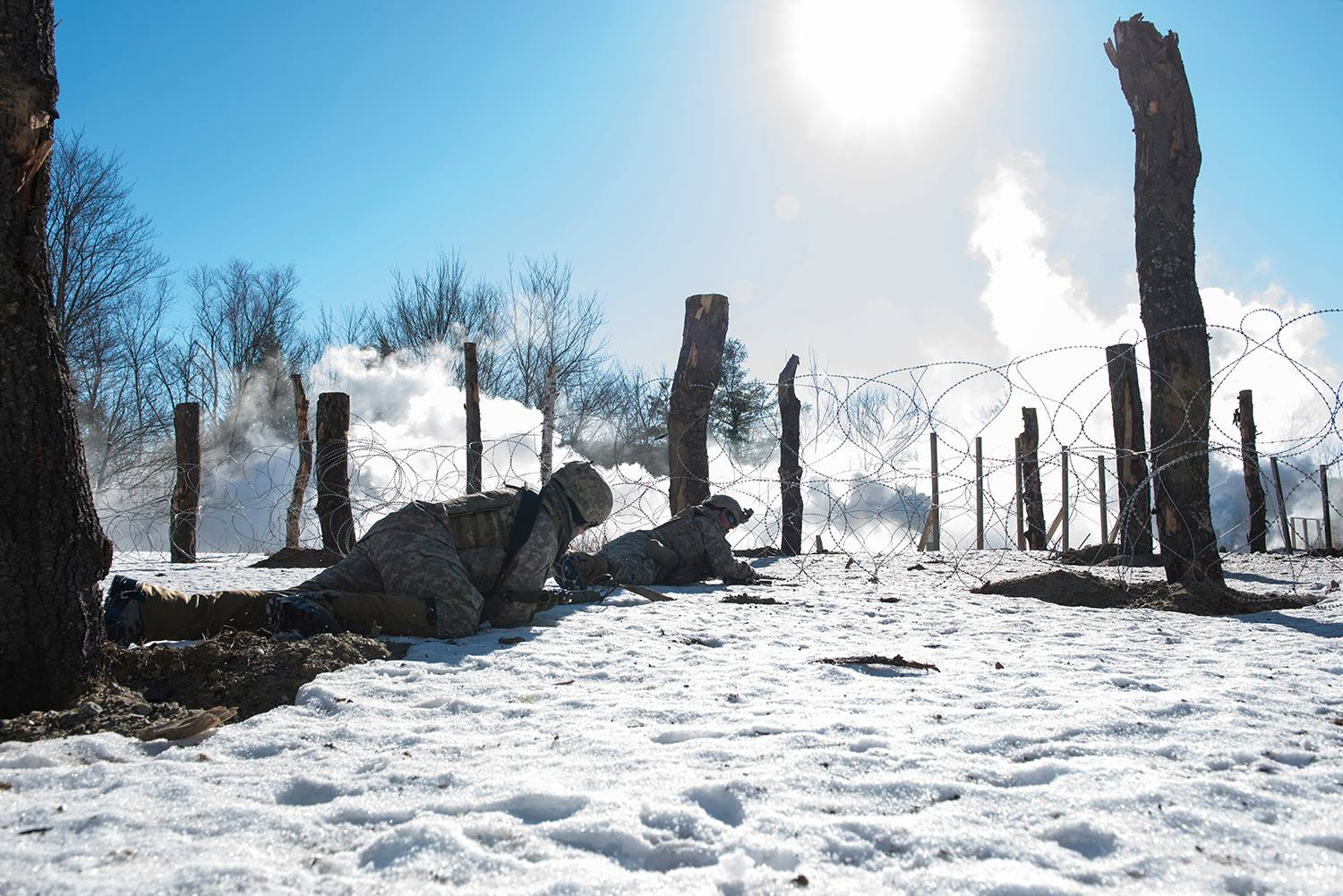
Engineers from the 572nd Brigade Engineer Battalion, 86th Infantry Brigade Combat Team practise obstacle clearing at Camp Ethan Allen Training Site

Ethan Allen Firing Range is a Vermont National Guard installation located in Jericho, Vermont. It is the location of the Army Mountain Warfare School and the 86th Infantry Brigade Combat Team. The land purchase for the site was formally authorized by president Calvin Coolidge in 1926. It was looked at as a future location for a proposed missile battery until 2013. At the camp is a fifty caliber machine gun range, the only one in New England.

The installation is named for Revolutionary War patriot Ethan Allen.
