= Mountain Leader Training Cadre =

Coordinates: 50.663971°N 3.438024°W

- Cap Badge of the Royal Marines
- Country: United Kingdom
- Branch: Royal Marines; Naval Service
- Type: Training
- Role: Instruction unit
- Part of: Mountain Leader and ISTAR Company
- Garrison/HQ: Lympstone

The Mountain Leader Training Cadre is a training element of the United Kingdom's Royal Marines which provides instruction in mountain warfare, arctic warfare, cold weather survival and operations, and cliff assault. The cadre has a permanent staff of mountain and arctic warfare instructors and trains mountain leaders for employment in the formations of the corps. The cadre is part of the Mountain Leader and ISTAR Company within Specialist Wing of the Commando Training Centre Royal Marines and is based in Lympstone.

== History ==
During the 1950s the Royal Marine Cliff Assault Wing was formed to train marines in rock climbing and cliff assault techniques. Elite training of Cliff Leaders in the late 1950s required rocky landings from various small craft (kayaks, Zodiacs and other motorized assault craft) often in heavy seas onto the Cornish coast, and rapid tactical ascents and descent of the vertical faces. This skill set was necessary for exposing all trainees during the last week of the commando (green beret) course. Instructors publicly demonstrated (e.g. at Navy Days) commando methods of abseiling and high-speed fixed rope descent from clifftop grapple-hook anchors. These would typically include the 'run-down' method (a simple face down arm wrap, sometimes demonstrated on high urban buildings, and essential when carrying small arms) and the 'front swallow' and other dangerous slides down a fixed rope. These demonstrations were discontinued after Captain Antony Easterbrook, a 31-year-old member of the Cadre, fell to his death during a display in Madison Square Garden in 1960.

The Cliff Assault Wing became the Cliff Assault Troop in 1962, the Reconnaissance Leader Troop in 1965 and the Mountain And Arctic Warfare Cadre in 1970. It moved to Stonehouse Barracks at that time. The Mountain and Arctic Warfare Cadre featured in the 1985 BBC Television documentary series Behind the Lines. The series followed the progress of 25 prospective members of the cadre as they endure survival training on a Hebridean island (Islay) and Arctic conditions in Norway. The cadre was renamed the Mountain Leader Training Cadre in the early 1990s.

== Courses ==
ML1 is open only to Royal Marines who have completed Senior Command Course. Training similarly takes 8 months, with candidates instructing ML2 training under supervision before being assessed by experienced trainers instructing in regular units.

ML2 is open to Subalterns and Other Ranks who have completed Junior Command Course. The course is 8 months long and takes place over the autumn and winter months in the United Kingdom and Norway. Training includes rock climbing, survival, Resistance to Interrogation (RTI), patrolling and raiding, snow and ice climbing and cold weather survival.

ML3 was a 9-week course open to all levels, which has been replaced by the shorter Combat Recce Operator course, which allows individuals to go on to serve in the Commando Unit Recce Troops, Surveillance Reconnaissance Squadron, HMS Protector and Special Forces Support Group.

== See also ==
- Mountain Warfare Training Center – a similar training unit in the US Marine Corps
- High Mountain Military School - a similar training unit in the French Army
- Brigade Patrol Troop
- Pathfinder Platoon
- List of mountain warfare forces
