= Mountain Warfare Training Center =

Subordinate element of U.S. Marine Corps

Mountain Warfare Training Center, MWTC
- Mono County, northwest of Bridgeport, California
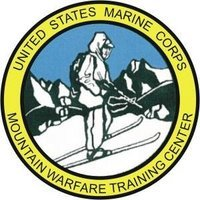
- MWTC Insignia

Site information
- Type: Military base

Location
- Coordinates: 38°21′33″N 119°30′45″W

Site history
- Built: 1951
- In use: 1951–present

Garrison information
- Current commander: COL Jackson T. Doan

The Mountain Warfare Training Center (MWTC) is a United States Marine Corps installation located in Pickel Meadows in Mono County, California, at 6,800 feet (2,100 m) above sea level in the Toiyabe National Forest, 21 miles (34 km) northwest of Bridgeport, California. The training center exists to train units in complex compartmented terrain.

== Mission ==
The Marine Corps' Mountain Warfare Training Center, as a major subordinate element of Marine Air Ground Task Force Training Command, and with support from Marine Corps Installations West, conducts unit and individual training courses to prepare USMC, Joint, and Allied Forces for operations in mountainous, high altitude, and cold weather environments in support of the Regional Combatant Commanders. Additionally, MWTC provides support to Marine Corps Combat Development Command (MCCDC); Training and Education Command; Marine Corps Systems Command; and other USMC and Department of Defense (DOD) agencies engaged in the development of war-fighting doctrine and specialized equipment for use in mountain and cold weather operations.

== History ==
MWTC Basecamp, Pickel Meadows

The Mountain Warfare Training Center (MWTC) is one of the Corps' most remote and isolated posts. The center was established in 1951 as the Cold Weather Battalion with a mission of providing cold-weather training for replacement personnel bound for Korea. After the Korean War, in 1963, the school was renamed the "Mountain Warfare Training Center" due to its expanded role. During the 1980s, the Training Center's focus was on training and preparing Marines and operational units for deployments on NATO's Northern flank, particularly Norway. Recently, with the Global War on Terrorism, the MWTC provided pre-deployment training in support of Operation Enduring Freedom—the war in Afghanistan.

== Operating areas ==
MWTC is located in Pickel Meadows of the Sierra Nevada mountains south of Lake Tahoe on 46,000 acres (190 km^{2}) of mountainous terrain with elevations from 6,700 ft (2,000 m) – 11,000 ft (3,400 m) . Other areas utilized by MWTC: Sweetwater Airstrip 6,835 ft (2,083 m), Mount Shasta 14,179 ft (4,322 m), the eastern slopes of the Sierra Nevada (U.S.) and Hawthorne Army Depot for live fire exercises. 38°21′24″N 119°30′59″W

== Installation capabilities ==
- Billeting facilities to support 1200+ training personnel
- Chowhall to support permanent and training personnel
- Naval Hospital Branch Clinic
- Mountain Warfare Fire & Emergency Services
- Base Security Forces / PMO
- Classrooms and base theater
- 1007' VSTOL-capable Expeditionary Airfield (EAF)
- Fleet of BV 206 restricted terrain vehicles Bandvagn 206
- Stables and pack animals
- Specialized technical mountaineering and ski equipment
- Modern Range Operations Center
- Multiple small arms ranges
- Multiple rock climbing training areas
- Multiple stream crossing sites
- Ski Lift
- Avalanche training site
- Unit/Combat Operations Center
- MCCS, Post Exchange, Single Marine Program, Fitness Center and Rock Training/Climbing wall
- The Pickel Post, Base Newsletter
- Family Housing for Permanent personnel

== School of Mountain Warfare ==
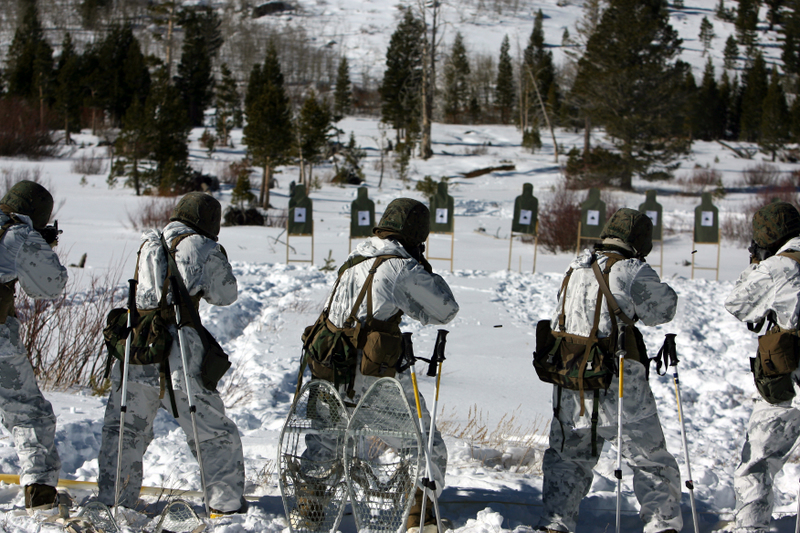
Marines conduct cold weather live fire small arms range

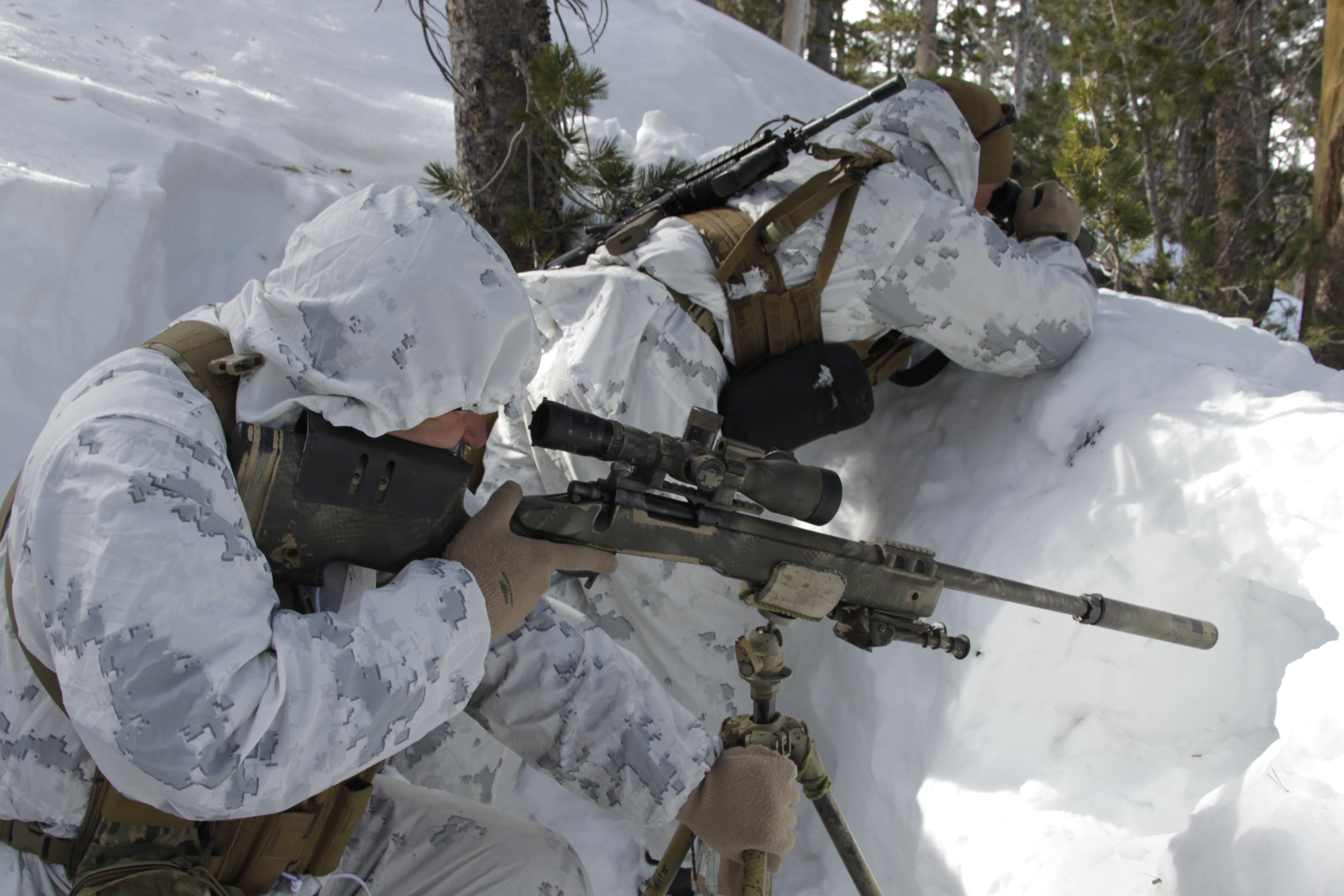
Scout Snipers train at the Mountain Warfare Training Center

=== Formal courses and training programs offered ===
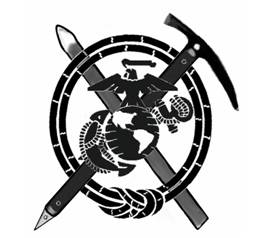
USMC Mountain Leader (S/W) Logo

- Mountain Communications Course
- Mountain / Cold Weather Pre-Environmental Training
- Mountain Operations Staff Planning Course
- Summer and Winter Mountain Leader Courses
- Mountain / Cold Weather Scout Sniper Course
- Assault Climber Course
- Scout Skier Course
- Mountain / Cold Weather Survival Course
- Mountain / Cold Weather Medicine Course
- OSV (Over the Snow Vehicle) / rough terrain driver training
- Animal Packing Course
- Special Operation Forces (SOF) Horsemanship Course
- Mountain / Winter Engineer Course

Most courses require a first class Physical Fitness Test, typically conducted on Training Day 1.

=== Pre-Deployment Training Programs (PTP) ===
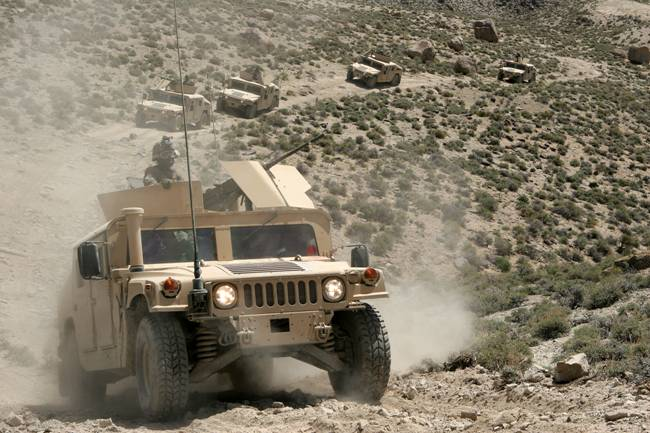
ETTs conducting rough terrain driving in Hawthorne May 2007

- Mountain Exercise (MTX) (revamped summer/winter package customized per METL) (2010–present)
  - Training for all USMC MAGTF elements/units for OEF
- Mountain Warrior
  - Training for USMC battalions headed to Afghanistan to participate in combat operations in support of OEF. Exercise Mountain Warrior was directed by the Commandant of the Marine Corps as an alternate training venue to Exercise Mojave Viper (EMV) (Mojave Viper) due to insufficient throughput capacity of EMV at Marine Corps Air Ground Combat Center Twentynine Palms. (2009–2010)
- Mountain Viper
  - Training for USMC Embedded Training Teams (ETTs) for OEF (2006–2009)

=== MWI (Mountain Warfare Instructor, a.k.a. Red Hats) Training ===
==== Basic MWI ====
- MLC or IQC (Instructor Qualification Course) Graduate, Seasonal
- BIC (Basic Instructor Course)
- SAT (Systems Approach to Training) and ORM (Operational Risk Management) Online Courses
- ORM (Operational Risk Management)
- RSO (Range Safety Officer)
- 225 score on the United States Marine Corps Physical Fitness Test (PFT) unadjusted for age or altitude
- Recommendation from Course Chief

==== Senior MWI ====
- Summer and Winter Mountain Leader Course (or IQC)
- Completed AIARE Level 1 Avalanche Course
- Qualify as a BSI (Basic Ski Instructor)
- Complete Snow II Clinic
- Complete Rock II Clinic
- Complete Alpine II Clinic
- Certified as a Wilderness First Responder or higher
- Completed 20 hours of platform Instruction
- Recommendation from OIC.

==== Master MWI ====
- Completed AIARE Avalanche Level 2 or Level 1 Instructor Course
- Qualify as a MSI (Military Ski Instructor).
- Complete Snow III Clinic
- Complete Rock III Clinic
- Complete Alpine III Clinic
- Completed 40 hours of platform Instruction
- Recommendation from OIC.

== See also ==
- US Navy Mountain Warfare Training Camp Michael Monsoor
- US Army Mountain Warfare School
- US Army Northern Warfare Training Center
- List of United States Marine Corps bases
