= Israel Antiquities Authority =

Independent Israeli governmental authority

Coordinates: 31°46′27.54″N 35°12′7.94″E

Israel Antiquities Authority רשות העתיקות

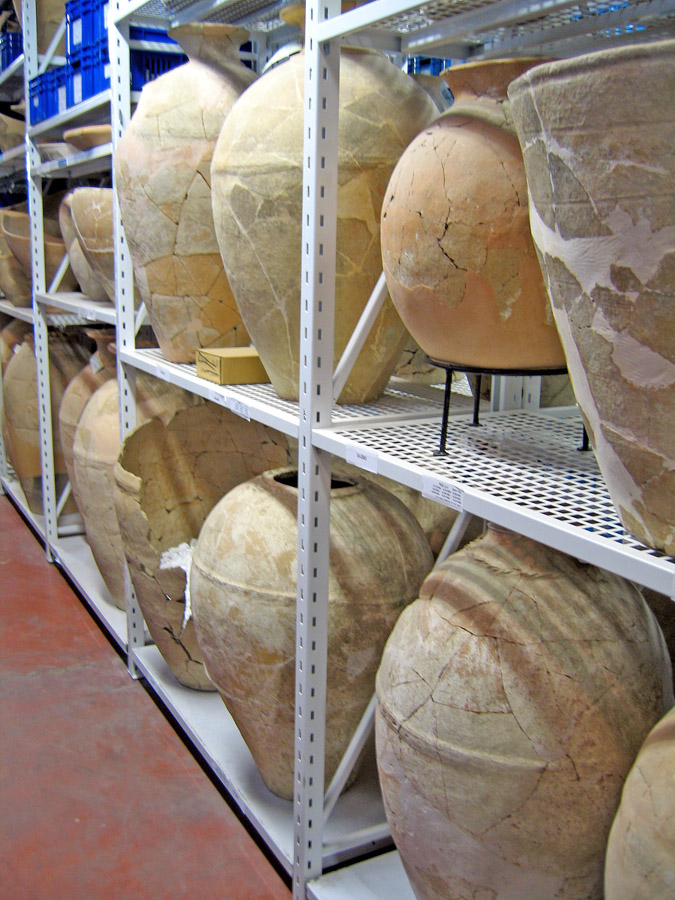
- Israel Antiquities Authority storage room
- Formation: 1948
- Headquarters: Jerusalem
- Website: www.antiquities.org.il

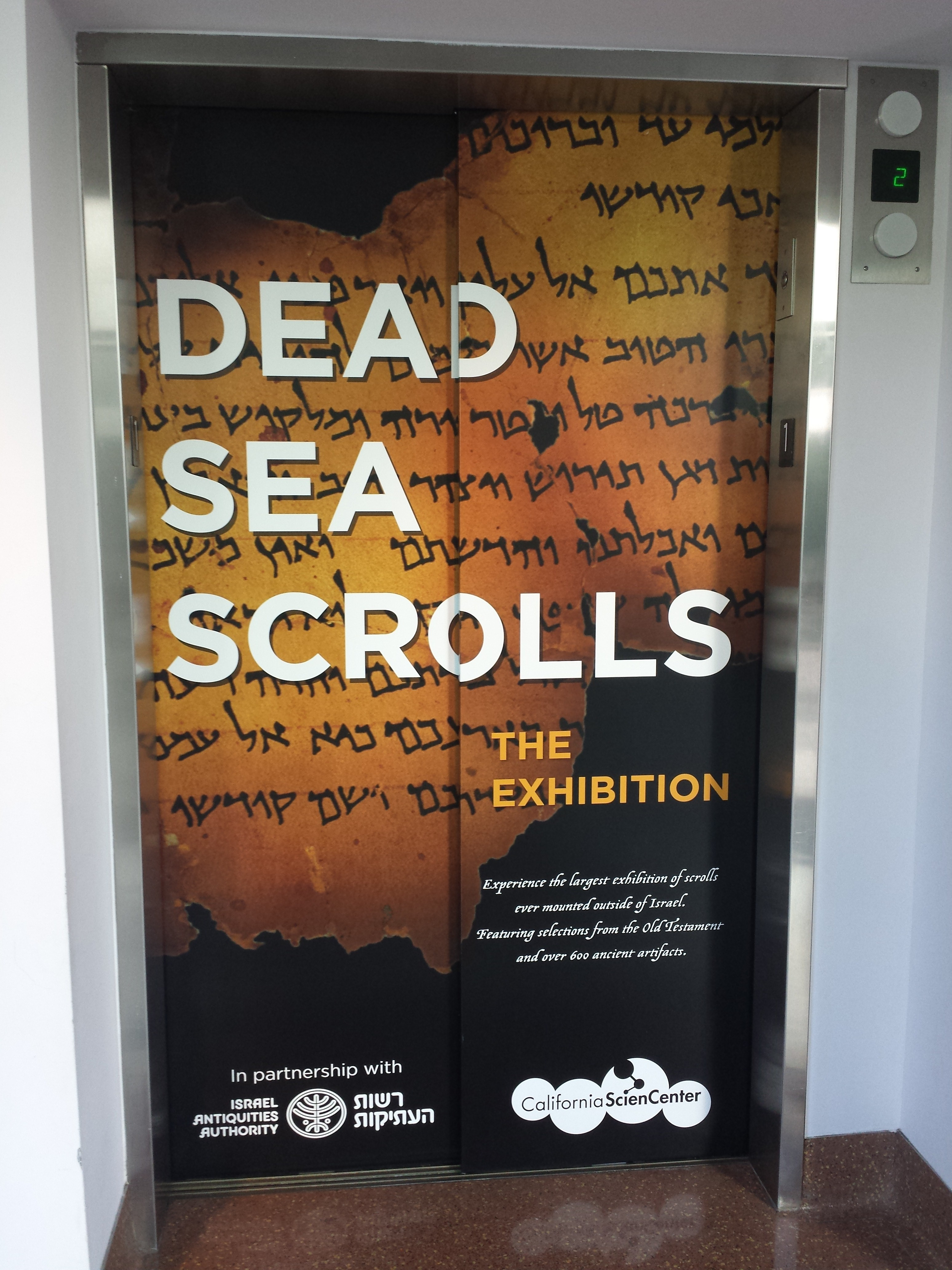
A Dead Sea Scrolls exhibition poster at the California Science Center says at lower left "In partnership with Israel Antiquities Authority"

The Israel Antiquities Authority (IAA, Hebrew: רשות העתיקות rashut ha-'atiqot; Arabic: دائرة آثار إسرائيل, before 1990, the Israel Department of Antiquities) is an independent Israeli governmental authority responsible for enforcing the 1978 Law of Antiquities. The IAA regulates excavation and conservation, and promotes research.

The National Campus for the Archaeology of Israel is the new home of the IAA, located on Museum Row in Jerusalem. In 2025, the almost completed Campus started offering guided tours, with the Visitor Experience center expected to be opened to the public in early 2027.

== History ==
The Israel Department of Antiquities and Museums (IDAM) of the Ministry of Education was founded on July 26, 1948, after the establishment of the State of Israel. It took over the functions of the Department of Antiquities of the British Mandate in Israel and Palestine. Originally, its activities were based on the British Mandate Department of Antiquities ordinances.

IDAM was the statutory authority responsible for Israel's antiquities and for the administration of small museums. Its functions included curation of the state collection of antiquities, storing of the state collection, maintaining a list of registered antiquities sites, inspecting antiquities sites and registering newly discovered sites, conducting salvage and rescue operations of endangered antiquities sites, maintaining an archaeological library (the state library), maintaining an archive.

The Israel Antiquities Authority (IAA) was created from the IDAM by the Knesset (Israeli parliament) in a 1990 statute. Amir Drori became its first director. The IAA fulfilled the statutory obligations of the IDAM and in its early days was greatly expanded from the core number of workers in IDAM to a much larger complement, and to include the functions of the Archaeological Survey of Israel project, ending the activity of the Association for the Archaeological Survey of Israel (1964–1988). The period of expansion lasted for a number of years, but was followed by a period in which diminished fiscal resources and a reduction in funding led to large cutbacks in the size of its work force and its activities.

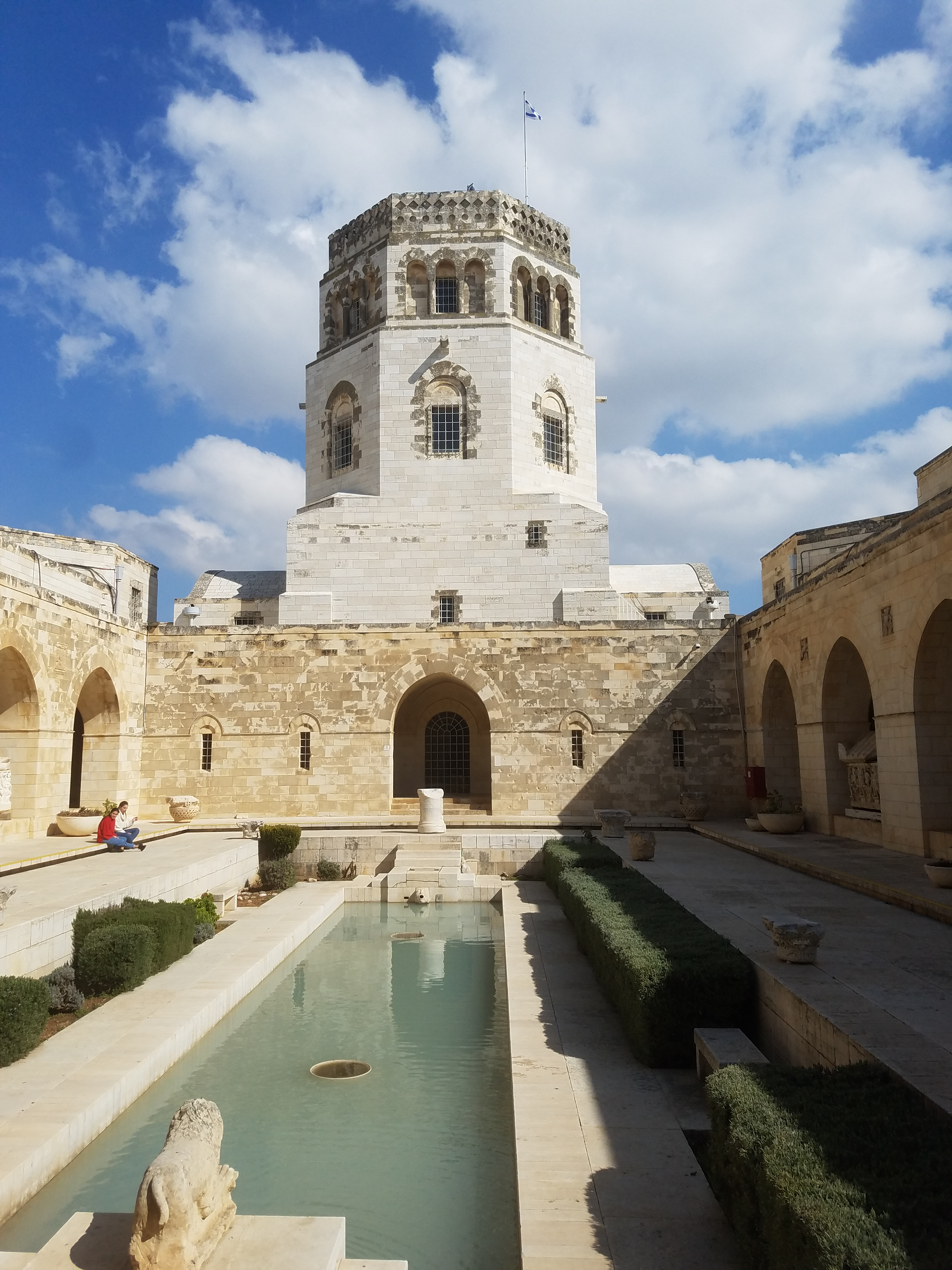
The Rockefeller Museum, where part of the IAA headquarters is located while awaiting the opening of the National Campus for the Archaeology of Israel.

== Publications ==
The IDAM and the IAA have published the results of excavations in a number of journals and other publications:

- Booklet of the Department of Antiquities (Hebrew), now defunct
- IAA Reports monograph series, started in the late 1990s (English)
- 'Atiqot / עתיקות (Hebrew and English), still published
- Hadashot Arkheologiyot – Excavations and Surveys in Israel (HA-ESI; Hebrew and English), still published, online.
- Qadmoniot: A Journal for the Antiquities of Eretz-Israel and Bible (Hebrew), published by Israel Exploration Society together with the IAA.
- Archaeological Survey of Israel. A GIS database of tiled maps covering 10 square kilometres (3.9 sq mi) of the State of Israel. Descriptive texts and media of surveyed sites. A continuous project, published online only (previously in print).

== The National Campus for the Archaeology of Israel ==
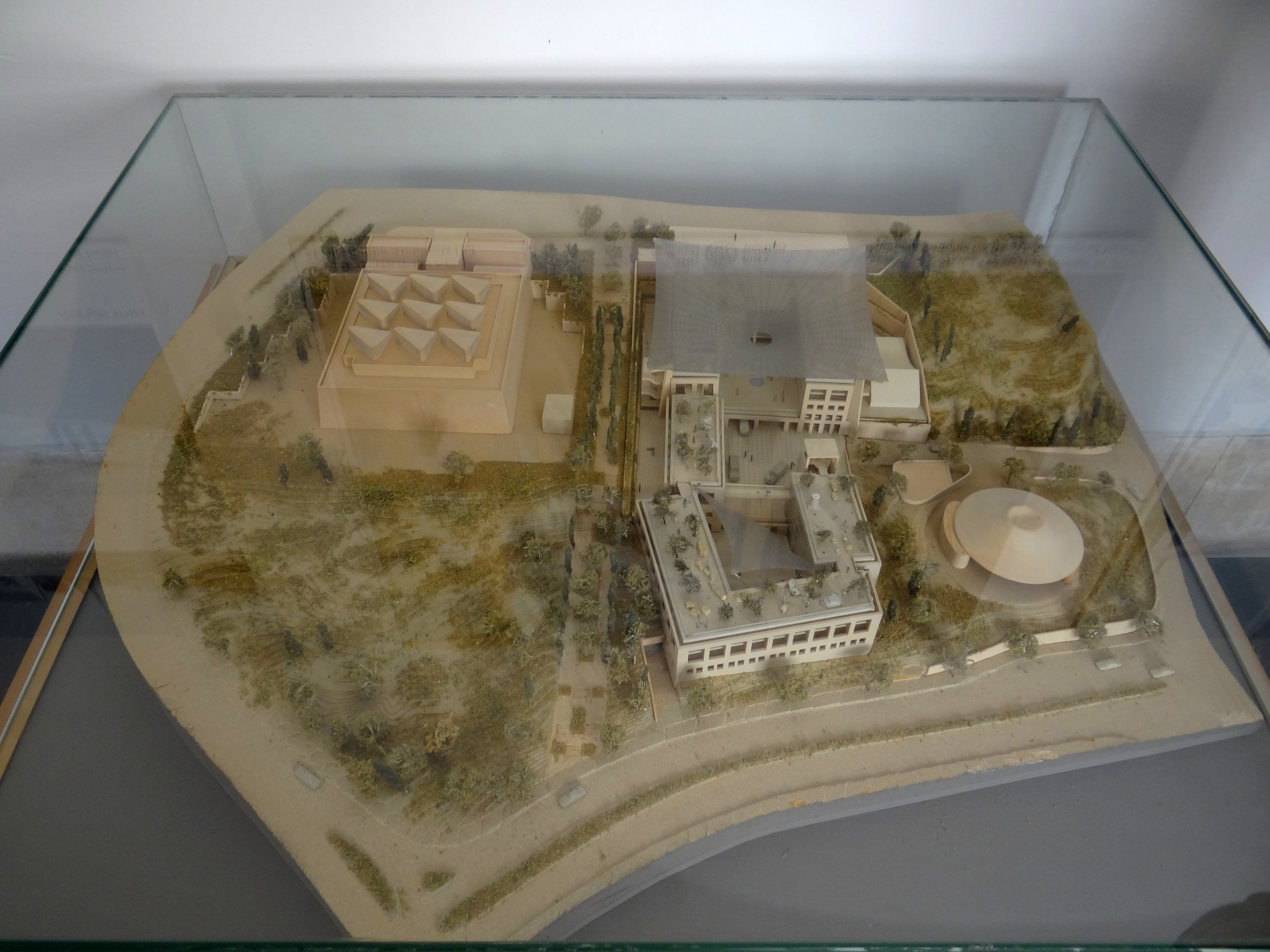
A model of the National Campus for the Archaeology of Israel built beside the Bible Lands Museum.

The Jay and Jeanie Schottenstein National Campus for the Archaeology of Israel is the future building of the IAA, aiming to concentrate all centralized administrative offices into one structure. The campus, designed by architect Moshe Safdie, is planned on 20,000 square meters between the Israel Museum and the Bible Lands Museum in Jerusalem. It also aims to exhibit approximately two million ancient artifacts and make them accessible to the public, as well as serve as a center for research, education, demonstration, display, and explanation of Israel's cultural heritage across its various cultural and religious spectrums, throughout human history.

The Visitor Experience center at the Campus was planned and designed for three years and is, as of March 2026, expected to be fully built by the end of 2026 and open to visitors in early 2027.

== Directors ==
- Shmuel Yeivin, 1948–1961
- Avraham Biran, 1961–1974
- Avraham Eitan, 1974–1988
- Amir Drori, 1988–2000
- Yehoshua (Shuka) Dorfman, 2000–July 31, 2014
- Yisrael Hasson, 2014–2020
- Eli Escusido he, sometimes misspelled Eskosido, 2021-

=== Other staff ===
- Levi Rahmani, archeologist and Chief Curator during the 1980s

== Restoration work ==
The IAA's restoration team, consisting as of 2010 of six members, restores potsherds, textiles, metal objects and other objects related to the material culture of the country discovered in archaeological excavations. Unlike their peers around the world, the team in Israel is barred by Israeli law from working with human remains.

== See also ==
- Council for Conservation of Heritage Sites in Israel, preserves sites from 1700 onwards not covered by the Antiquities Law
