= Artillery Corps (Israel) =

- חיל התותחנים
- Israeli Artillery Corps insignia
- Active: 1948–present
- Country: Israel
- Allegiance: Israel Defense Forces
- Branch: GOC Army Headquarters
- Mottos: "Sophistication and Might" (Hebrew: תחכום ועצמה, Tih'cum Ve'otzma)
- Engagements: War of Independence; Sinai War; Six-Day War; War of Attrition; Yom Kippur War; First Lebanon War; Second Lebanon War; Operation Cast Lead; Operation Protective Edge; Gaza war

Commanders
- Current commander: Tat Aluf Neri Horowitz

Insignia
- Cap badge

- Flag

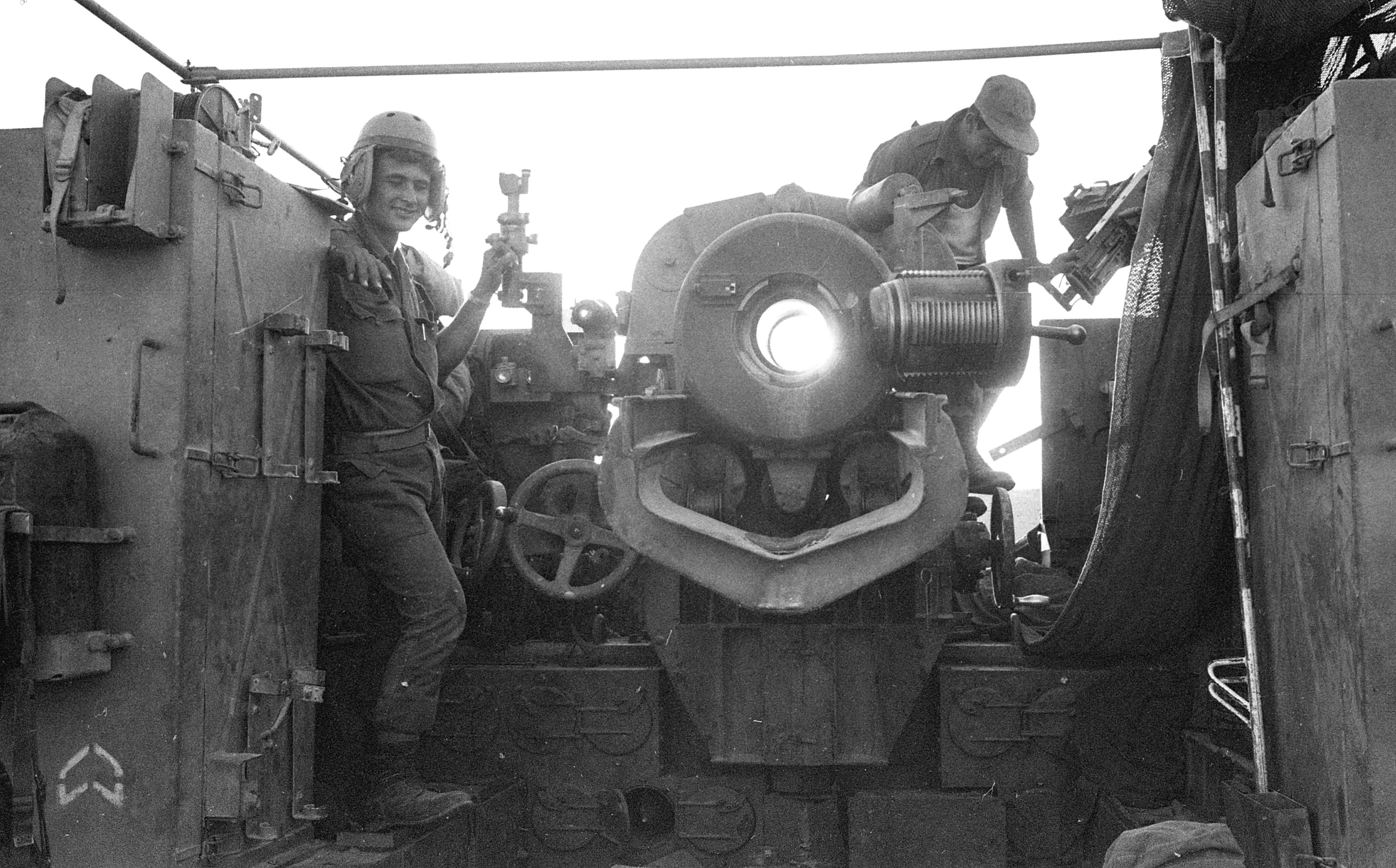
Artillery units in the Suez Canal, 1969

The Israeli Artillery Corps (Hebrew: חיל התותחנים, Heil HaTothanim) is the Israel Defense Forces corps responsible for operating medium and long-range artillery.

The corps is tasked with two principal missions:

1. Assisting IDF maneuvering forces, at the place, time and with the firepower required.
2. Paralyzing and destroying enemy targets throughout the IDF zone of operations.

The Artillery Corps is an integral corps of GOC Army Headquarters. It is a diverse corps, with its lion share consisting of high-trajectory barrel artillery. Artillery Corps soldiers wear Turquoise berets.

== Active artillery brigades ==
- 214th Artillery Brigade "David's Sling"
- 215th Artillery Brigade "Amud HaEsh"
- 282nd Artillery Brigade "Golan"
- 425th Artillery Brigade (Artillery School)

== Reserve artillery brigades ==
- 209th Artillery Brigade "Kidon"
- 213th Artillery Brigade "HaTkuma"
- 454th Artillery Brigade "Tabor"
- 7338th Artillery Brigade "Adirim"

== Equipment ==
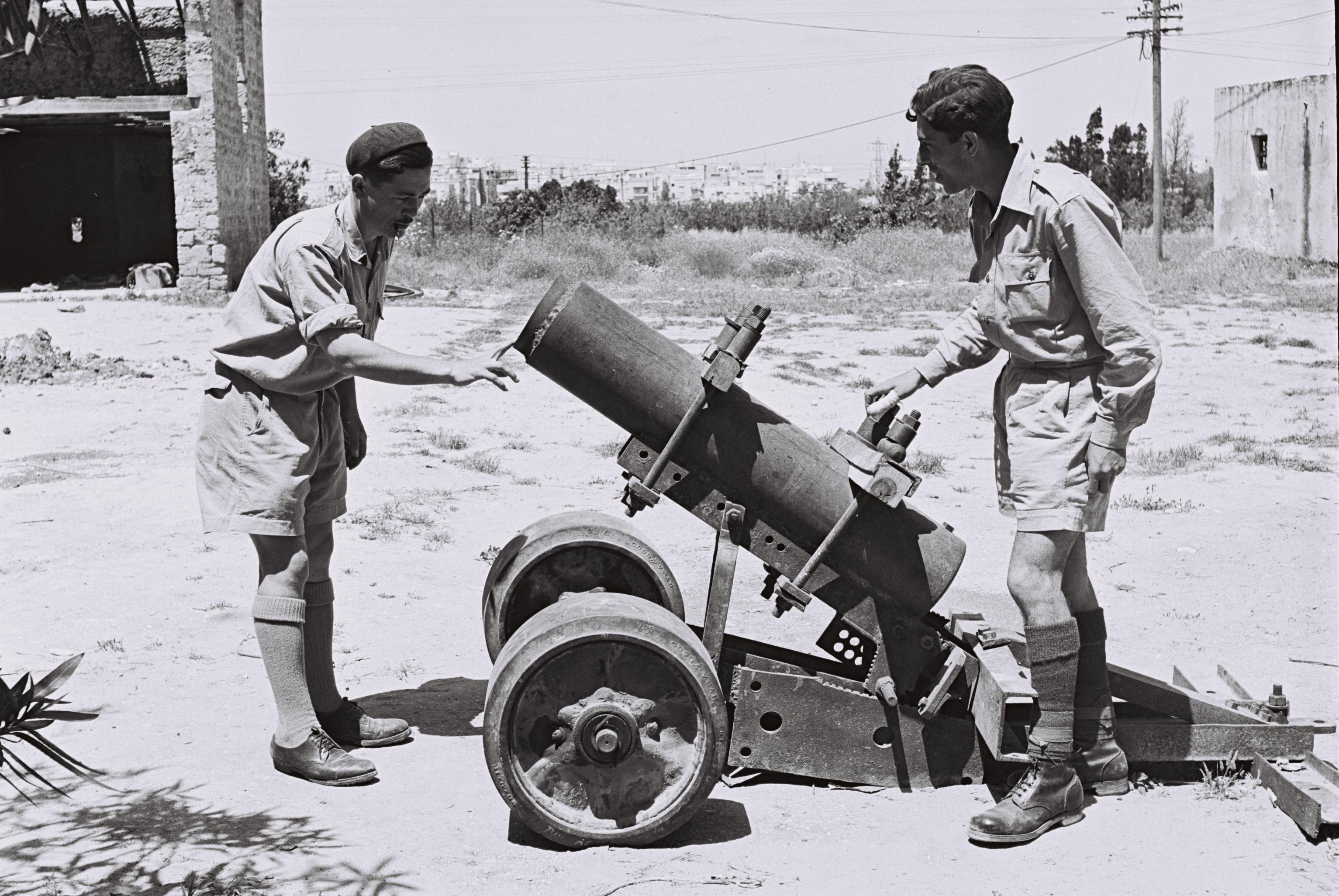
An artillery piece manufactured by the Haganah in a clandestine workshop outside Tel Aviv, 1948

The primary equipment used in most regular and reserve batteries is the M109 "Doher" (Galloper) self-propelled howitzer. To assist with ammunition carriage and transport, regular batteries use the M548, a modified version of the M113 carrier, nicknamed "Alpha". Batteries use Humvees and M113 carriers.

Also in service is the M270 MLRS multiple rocket launcher, the Spike NLOS missile system mounted on M113 chassis for precision strike, as well as the Elbit Hermes 450 and IAI Sky Rider UAVs for artillery spotting. On order are the IMI Lynx and IAI JUMPER multiple rocket launchers to bolster its strike capability against enemy positions and rocket-launching cells.

The corps possesses radar and navigation system, some of which are classified.

In 1977, the IDF began developing another self-propelled howitzer, the "Sholef" (Gun-slinger), based on the M109 with a Merkava chassis. The main advantage of the "Sholef" was its self-loading ability, which reduced the number of crewmen from 7 to 4. The project was completed but the IDF decided not to mass-produce the "Sholef" because of its high cost, preferring to purchase the M270 MLRS multiple rocket launcher instead. Its main focus switched to improving the precision systems of the "Doher". The "Sholef" was used operationally only once, in 1990.

In 2010, Israel began an overhaul of the Artillery Corps, based on lessons from the 2006 Lebanon War. The Artillery Corps is being upgraded with new, indigenously produced self-propelled cannons, rockets, missiles produced by Israel's defense industries, which will replace older equipment, as well as state-of-the-art command, control, computers, and communications. Its operational role now reflects a new concept in which artillery is seen as an equal part of the combat force rather than a support element.

== Training ==
The Israeli Artillery Corps holds its basic training, commanders course and officers school at the Field Artillery School (Hebrew: ביסל"ת, Bislat), better known as Shivta, after the ancient Nabataean town of the same name.

New recruits go through four months of basic training, in which they learn basic infantry weaponry and drills, as well as basic theoretical artillery training. At the end of the basic training stage, the recruits receive their Turquoise berets, symbolizing their acceptance into the corps. They then advance to four months of advanced training, throughout which they participate in IDF operations. After completing their training, soldiers either join operational batteries or advance to the commanders course, for an additional four months of training.

== Commanders ==
Since 1948, the Israeli Artillery Corps had 26 commanders (Chief Artillery Officer):

- March–April 1948: Lieutenant Colonel Yehuda Ginzburg
- April 1948–1949: Colonel Shmuel Admon
- 1949–1952: Colonel Meir Ilan
- 1952–1957: Colonel Shalom E'iron
- 1957–1961: Colonel Dan Hiram
- 1961–1967: Colonel Israel Ben Amitai
- 1967–1971: Brigadier General Baruch Bruchin
- 1971–1973: Brigadier General Arie Levi
- 1973–1976: Brigadier General Nathan Sharoni
- 1976–1980: Brigadier General Avraham Bar David
- 1980–1983: Brigadier General Arie Mizrachi
- 1983–1986: Brigadier General Oded Tira
- 1986–1989: Brigadier General Shmuel Reshef
- 1989–1993: Brigadier General Doron Kadmiel
- 1993–1995: Brigadier General Yehoshua Dorfman
- 1995–1998: Brigadier General Dan Harel
- 1998–2001: Brigadier General Eli Yafe
- 2001–2005: Brigadier General Dani Kasif
- 2005–2008: Brigadier General Laurence Mualem
- 2008–2009: Brigadier General Mishel Ben Baruch
- 2009–2012: Brigadier General David Swissa
- 2012–2015: Brigadier General Roei Riptin
- 2015–2018: Brigadier General Alon Kloss
- 2018–2020: Brigadier General Aviram Sela
- 2020–2023: Brigadier General Neri Horvitz
- 2023-present: Brigadier General Yair Nathans

== Notable alumni ==
- Dan Harel
- Danny Robas
- Yuval Banay
- Shlomo Artzi
- Yair Nitzani
- Amos Lapidot
