= Ski warfare =

Use of ski-equipped troops in war

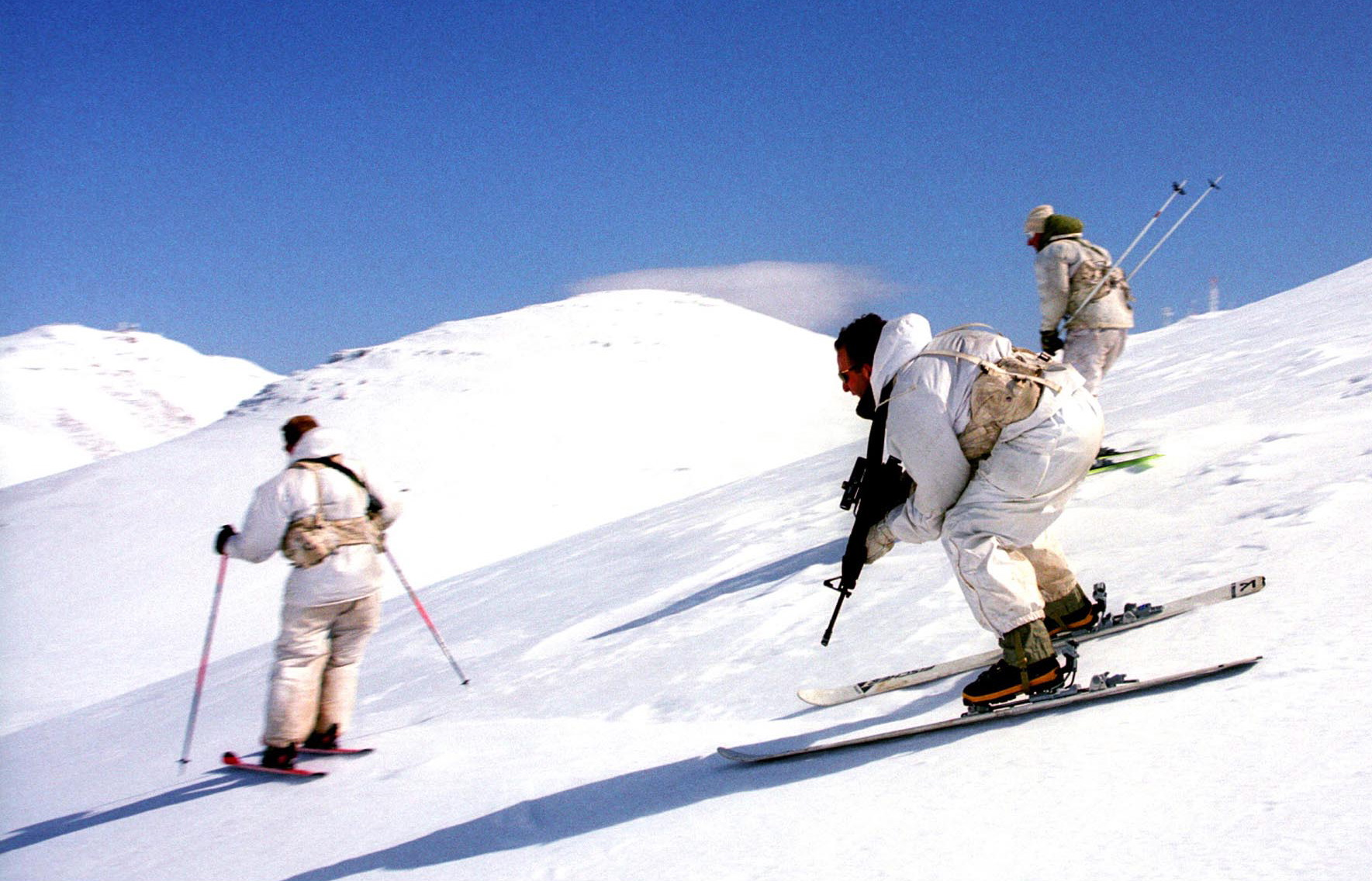
Israeli Alpinist Unit soldiers during a training session in Mount Hermon

Ski warfare is the use of ski-equipped troops in war.

== History ==
=== Early ===
Ski warfare is first recorded by the Danish historian Saxo Grammaticus in the 13th century. During the Battle of Oslo in 1161, Norwegian troops used skis for reconnoitering. They were also used in 1452 in Sweden, and in the 15th to 17th centuries by various other Scandinavian countries. Norwegian Captain Jens Emahusen wrote a military ski manual Skiloperegglement in 1733. In 1767, military ski competitions began. They evolved into the biathlon.

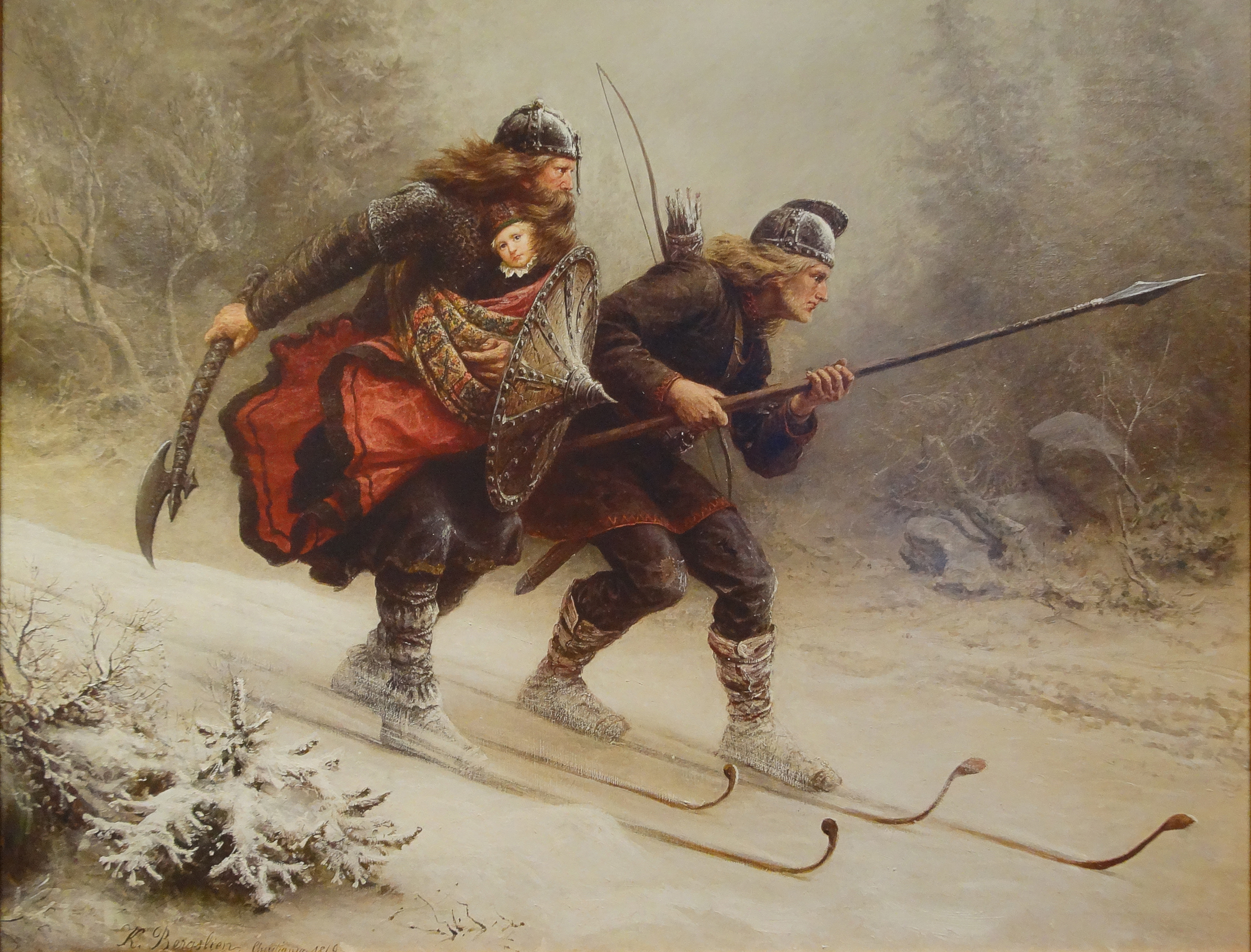
Skiing Birkebeiners

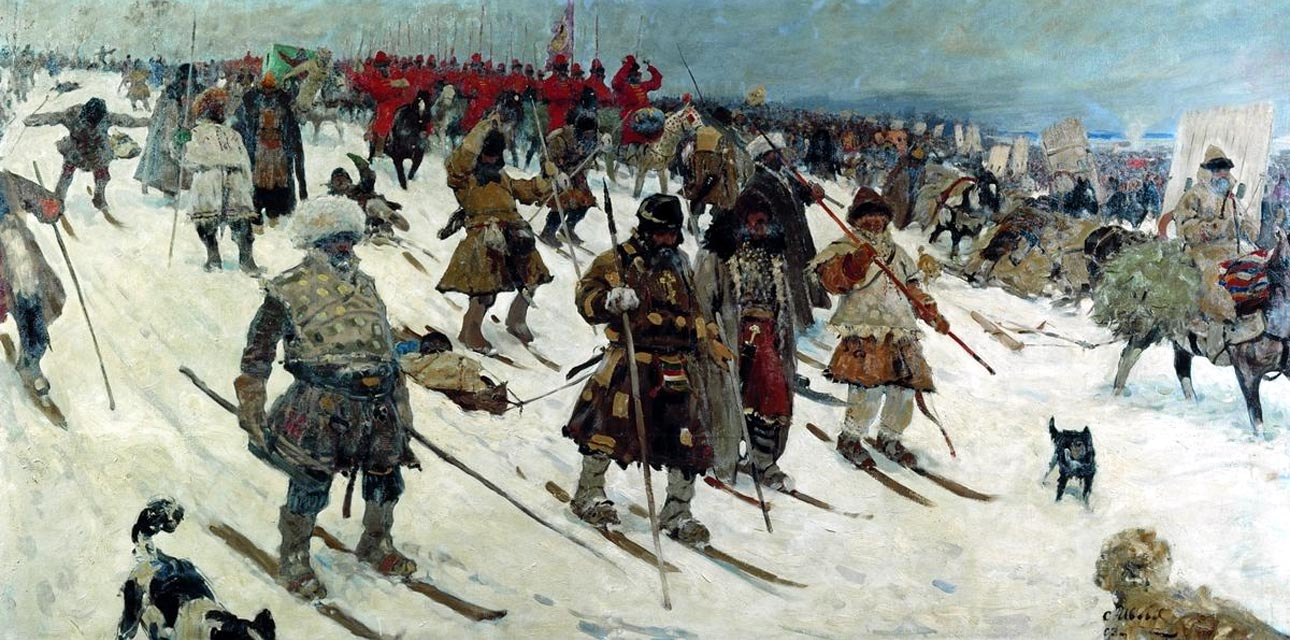
Muscovite campaign against the Lithuanians, a painting by Sergei Ivanov (1903)

=== Napoleonic Wars ===
Denmark–Norway (though only Norwegian) ski troops were used against Sweden during the Gunboat War in the Napoleonic Wars. Mainly used by the Ski Battalion and the 1ste Nordenfieldske Skieløber-Bataillon.

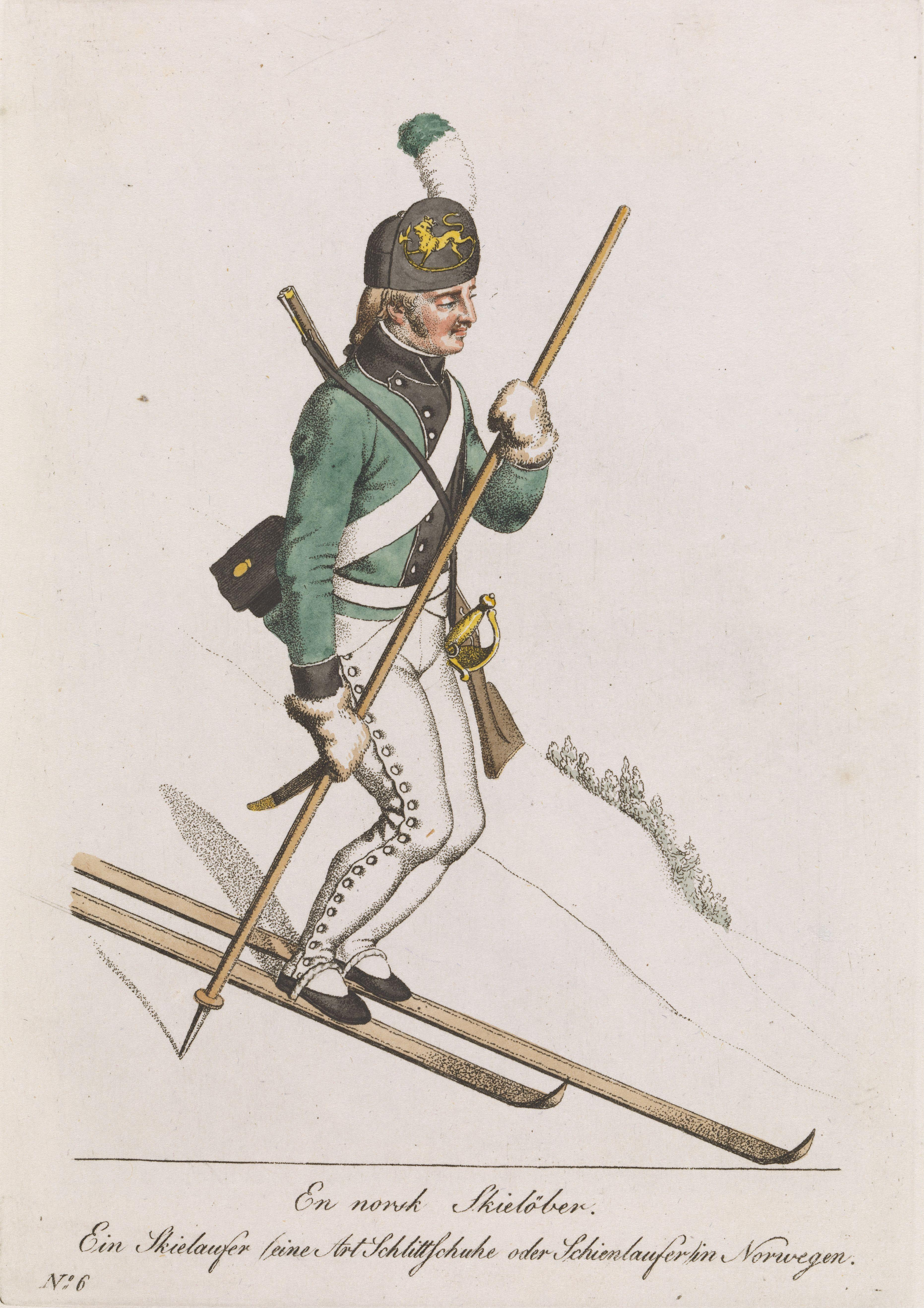
A Norwegian soldier on skis, 1801

=== World War I ===
Just prior and during World War I many combatants deployed ski troops as part of mountain infantry divisions. France created the Briançon military ski school in 1904. The Italian Army raised 88 Alpini Battalions. Their purpose was to fight summer and winter in the highest regions of the Alpine Arch. Most of the battalions were dissolved after World War I. Only nine Alpini regiments remain in service today, and only four still train every soldier in ski warfare: the 4th Alpini Parachutist Regiment, 5th Alpini Regiment, 6th Alpini Regiment and 7th Alpini Regiment. France's Chasseurs Alpins, created in 1888, consisted of 12 battalions. Currently three remain. Romanian Mountain Corps consisted of three battalions. The Austro-Hungarian Army had the Kaiserjäger. German Alpenkorps was founded in 1915 with two brigades.

The Ottoman Empire deployed ski shock troops in the Caucasus campaign.

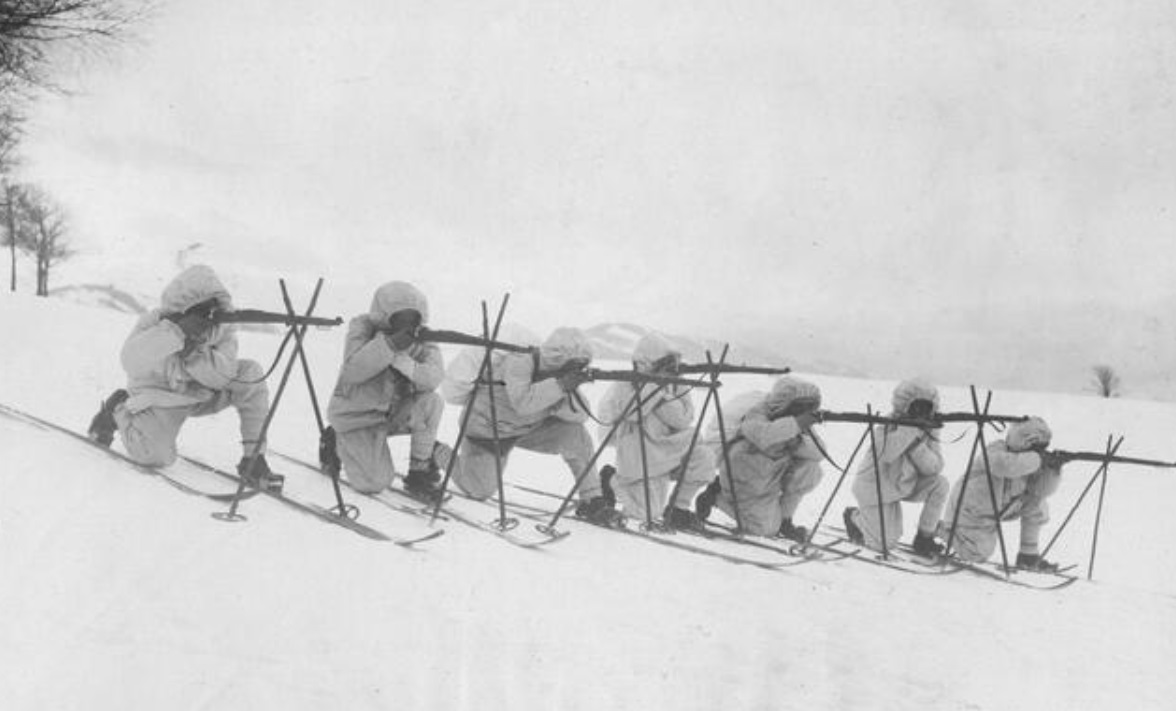
Imperial German soldiers on skis wearing snow camouflage (1916)

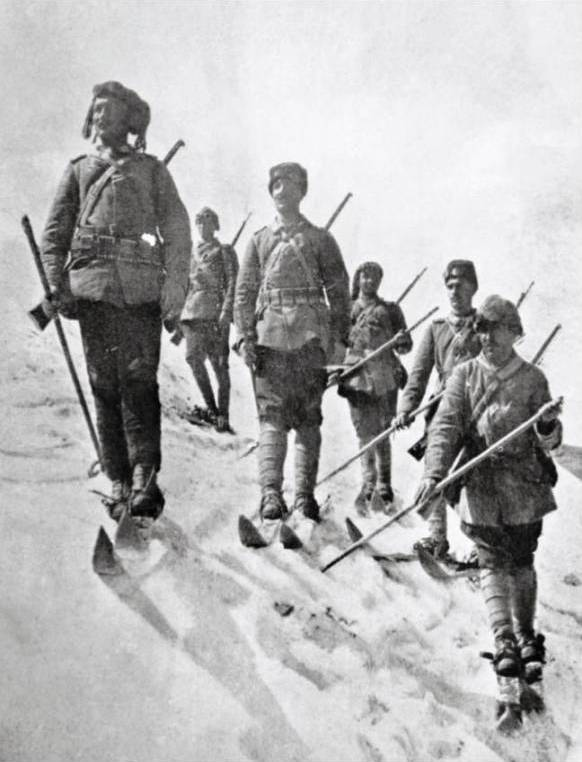
Ottoman shocktroopers during Battle of Sarikamis.

=== World War II ===
Ski troops played a key role in the successes of the Finnish war effort against the Soviet Union during the Winter War in 1939. Forested, rural terrain with no roads was used by Finnish ski troops with great success against the advancing mechanized Soviet troops. In the Battle of Suomussalmi, two Soviet mechanized divisions (45,000 men) were annihilated by three Finnish regiments (11,000 men).

German units included the 1st Ski Division and 6th SS Mountain Division Nord.

Italian ski troops included the Arditi Alpieri formation, the Monte Bianco formation, the Monte Cervino battalion, and the Monte Rosa battalion. They were deployed in France, the Balkans, and the Soviet Union.

The Soviet Union deployed 11 ski battalions, among other troops, in November 1941 to reinforce their defenses in the Battle of Moscow.

The most common transportation for Norwegian soldiers during the Norwegian Campaign in 1940 was skis and sleds, and in Operation Gunnerside, paradropped Norwegian commandos covered a large distance using skis in order to reach and sabotage the heavy water plant Vemork at Rjukan in Telemark, Norway, which was being used by the Germans as part of their nuclear research programme.

Ski warfare even extended to the Middle East where the Australian Ski Corps were deployed against Vichy French forces in the mountains of Lebanon.

The United States Army 10th Mountain Division was established and trained for ski combat. They were deployed in Italy.

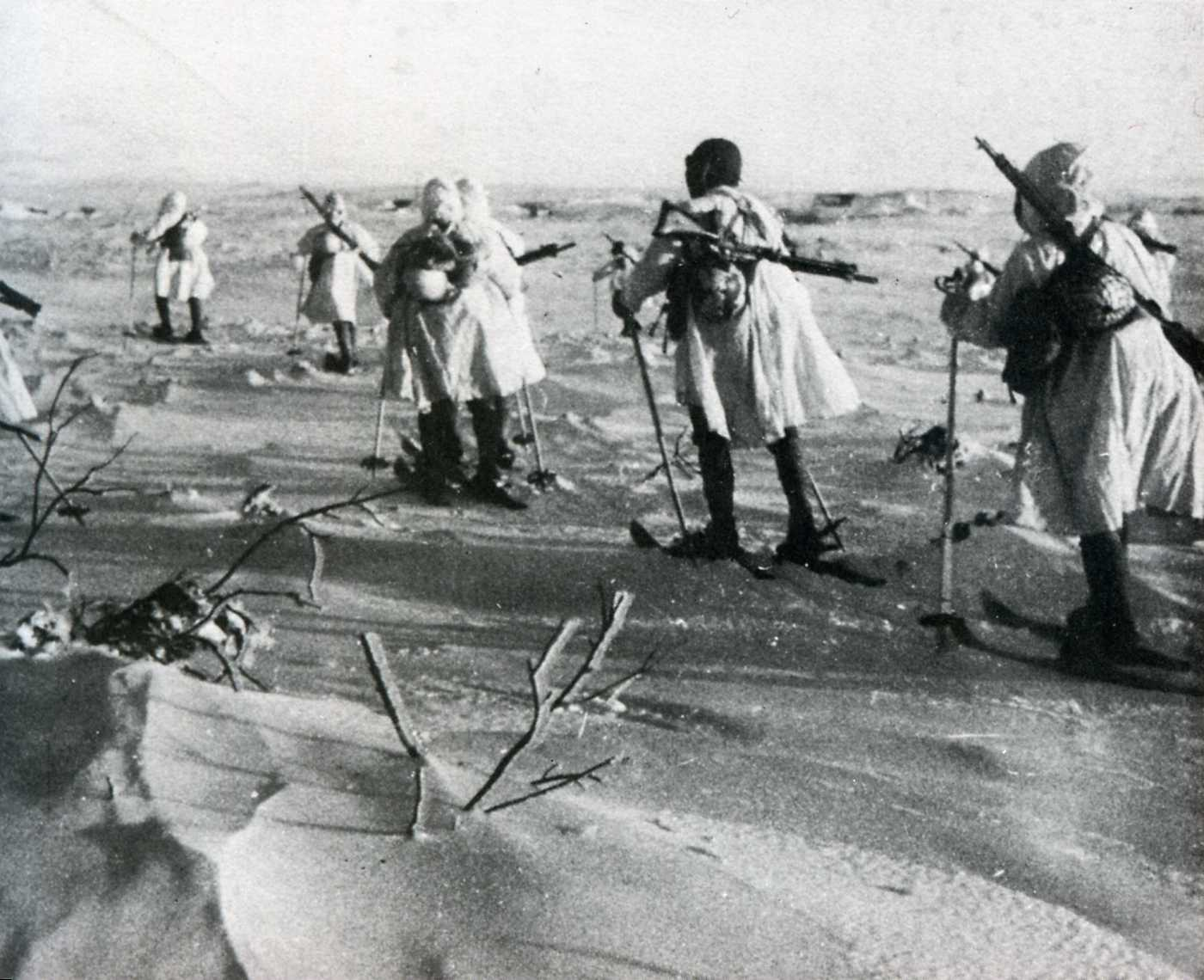
Imperial Japanese Army ski troops on maneuveurs in Chishima Islands, circa 1940

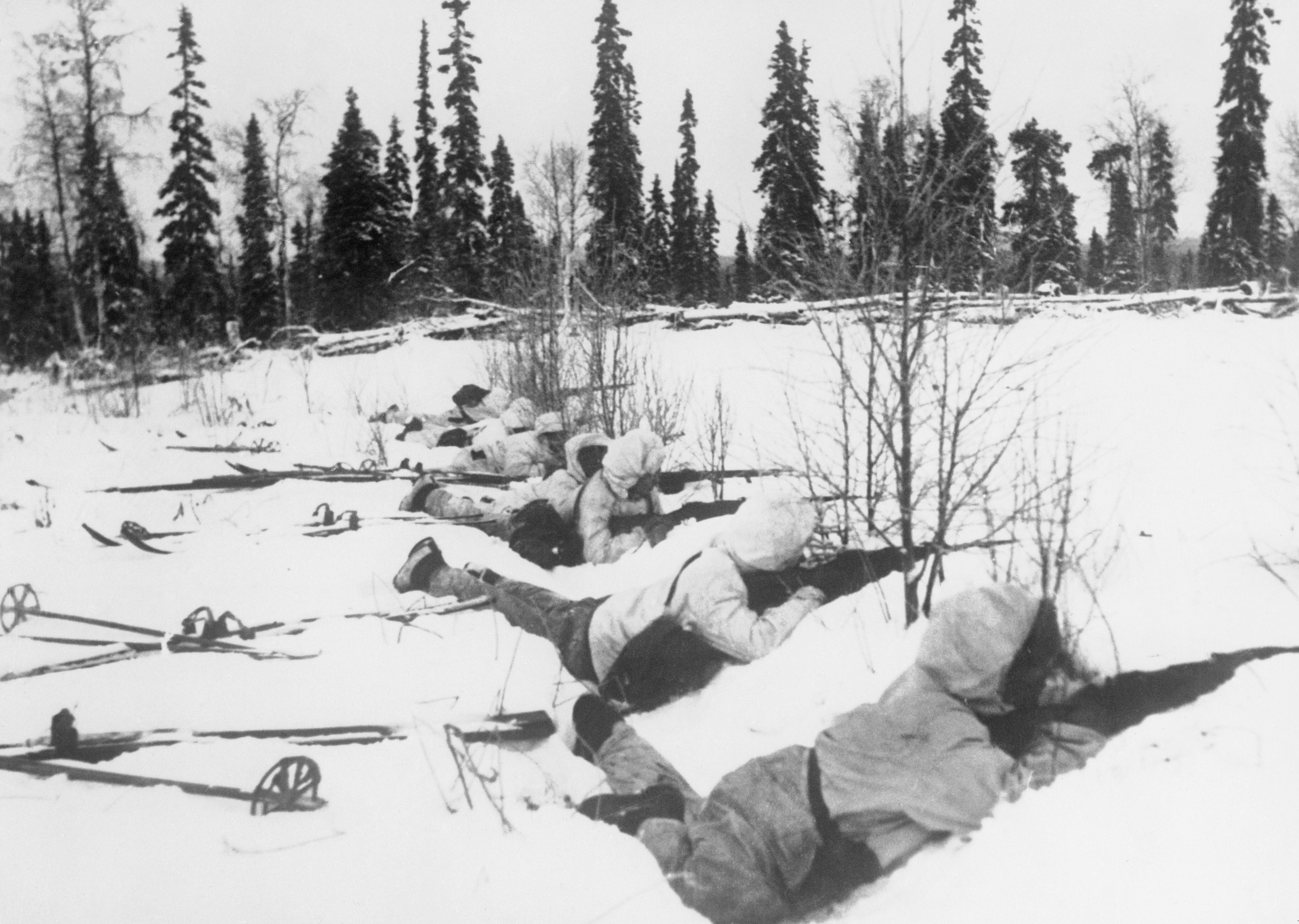
Finnish ski troops in Northern Finland during the Winter War in January 1940

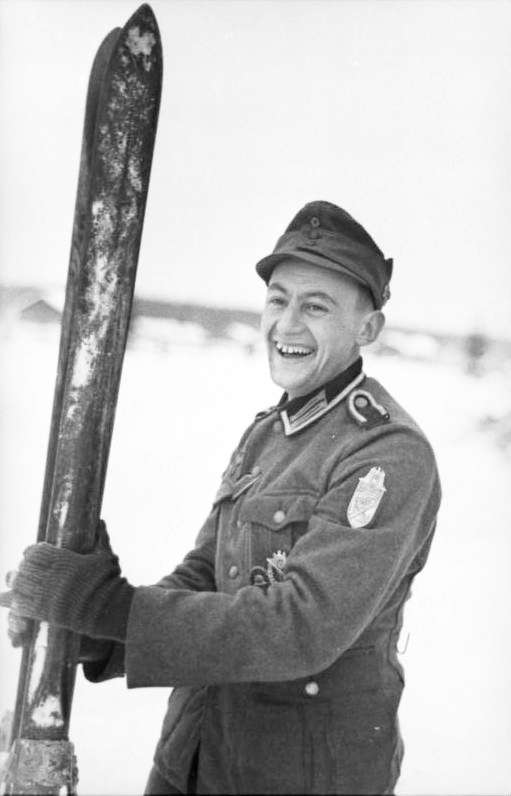
German Gebirgsjäger with skis in 1942

== Contemporary usage ==
Swedish, Finnish and Norwegian defense forces use skis in cross country skiing but also by pulling squads of soldiers with tracked transport vehicles or snow mobiles. One or two ropes hang from the end of a tracked vehicle such as the famous Swedish Hägglunds Bandvagn 206 or the Finnish Sisu Nasu and troops hang onto the ropes with their hands and ski-poles.

Many nations train troops in skiing and winter warfare, including:

- Austrian Army – Certain soldiers are trained in ski combat.
- Canadian Army – Certain troops, such as Voltigeurs de Québec, are trained in winter warfare operation and skiing. Multiple units like the Voltigeurs form the Arctic Response Company Group.
- Danish Navy – Slædepatruljen Sirius (Sirius Arctic Patrol) patrols Northern and Eastern Greenland.
- Estonian Army – Conscripts routinely receive training in skiing and other winter warfare skills.
- Finnish Army – All soldiers are trained in ski combat, and skiing is a part of standard required training for conscripts.
- French Army – 27th Chasseurs Alpins Brigade
- German Bundeswehr – Gebirgsjäger
- Hellenic Army – Greek Special Forces Command has a mountain ski warfare training center (ΚΕΟΑΧ) on Mount Olympus for Marines and Commandos.
- Italian Army has the Alpini Corp with 16 Regiments.
- Israel Defense Forces – Has a special Alpinist Unit.
- Lebanese Armed Forces – Mountain Combat Company part of the Lebanese Commando Regiment
- Netherlands – Royal Netherlands Marine Corps, Korps Commandotroepen and the 11 Luchtmobiele Brigade – annual exercises taking place in the interior of Northern Norway
- Norwegian Army – All soldiers are trained in ski combat.
- Polish Army – 21st Podhale Rifles Brigade and elements of the 6th Paratroopers Brigade.
- Romanian Land Forces – Vânători de Munte (Mountain Hunters), all soldiers are trained in ski combat.
- Russian Navy – 80th Separate Arctic Motor Rifle Brigade is a specialized arctic warfare shore unit of the Northern Fleet, based in Alakurtti, Murmansk Oblast, is but one of the many similar units, where the ski combat is a part of the training.
- Spain – "Brigada de Cazadores de Montaña Aragón I" (Mountain Light Infantry Brigade Aragón I), in Jaca (Huesca) with a specialized section "Compañía de Esquiadores-Escaladores" (Skiing-Climbing Company), in Jaca (Huesca).
- Slovenian Army – 132nd Mountain Battalion is trained in ski combat and mountain survival, Slovenian army is member of International Federation of Mountain Soldiers – IFMS. Slovenia is also a host nation for NATO's Multinational Centre of Excellence for Mountain Warfare.
- Sweden – Majority of soldiers are trained in ski combat
- Switzerland's – 3rd Mountain Army Corps (Corps d’armée de montagne 3)
- Turkish Land Forces – Hakkari Mountain and Commando Brigade.
- United Kingdom – Members of the Royal Marines UK Commando Force are trained in alpine and cold weather warfare at facilities in Norway.
- United States – The United States Marine Corps through the Marine Corps Mountain Warfare Training Center in northern California; the US Army in Alaska at the Northern Warfare Training Center and the Army Mountain Warfare School in Jericho, Vermont and the US Navy also in Alaska at Naval Special Warfare Cold Weather Detachment Kodiak.

== Other information ==
The Norwegian military have held skiing competitions since the 1670s. The sport of biathlon was developed from military skiing competitions.

The United States ski patrol plays a vital role in the plot to the book A Separate Peace.

== See also ==
- List of mountain warfare forces
- Skiing and skiing topics
- History of skiing
- Aerosledge
- Biathlon
- Cold-weather warfare
- Military patrol
- Battle of IJsselmeer
