= HeHarim Brigade =

Israeli mountain military unit

810th Mountain Brigade
- חטיבת ההרים
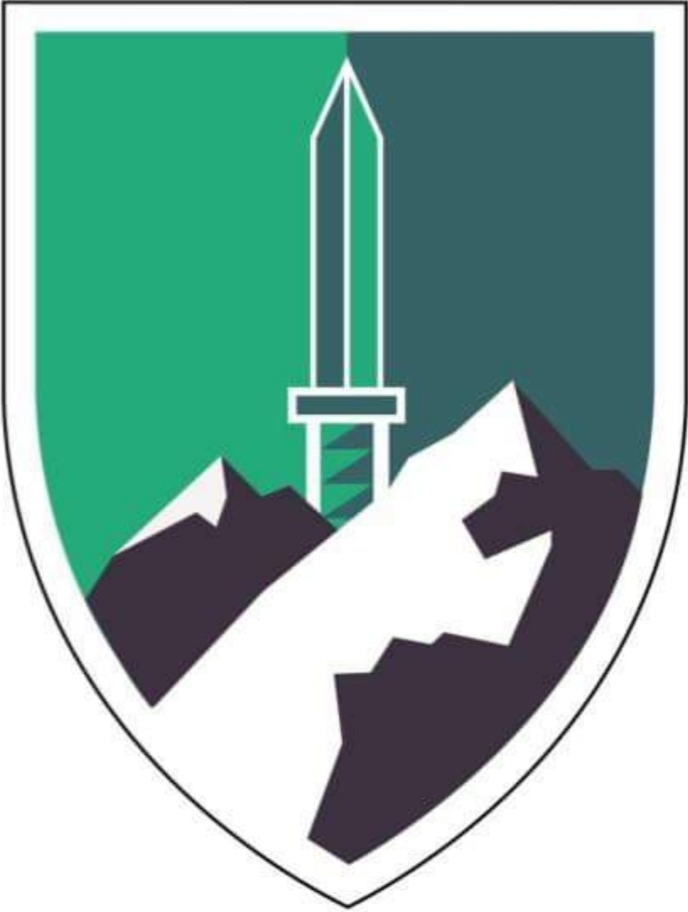
- Active: 19 March 2024 - present
- Country: Israel
- Branch: Israeli Ground Forces
- Type: Mountain infantry
- Size: Brigade
- Part of: 210th Division

Commanders
- Current commander: Colonel Liron Appleman

The 810th Mountain Brigade (Hebrew: חטיבת ההרים, "Heharim Brigade" lit. "Mountain Brigade") is an infantry brigade in the Israeli Ground Forces falling under the 210th Division that specialized in Mountain warfare. Other reas of specialization are counterinsurgency, CQB/CQC in urban areas, desert warfare, raiding with small unit tactics, and reconnaissance in difficult to access terrain areas.

The Brigade is tasked with protecting the Mount Hermon and Shebaa Farms regions.

Colonel Liron Appleman is its first commander.

== Mission ==
The HeHarim Brigade is specialised in operations in border security, counterinsurgency, and difficult terrain and warfare in mountainous regions, as well as urban warfare. The Brigade is intended to replace the 810th Territorial Brigade "Hermon".

According to the Israel Defence Forces, the Mountain Brigade has been established in order to provide a high-quality operational response on both Lebanese and Syrian fronts.

== Brigade organization 2025 ==
- 810th Mountain Brigade
  - 1810th Infantry Battalion
  - 8552th Infantry Battalion
  - 9307th Infantry Battalion
  - Alpinist Unit
  - 9132nd Signal Company
