= 209th Artillery Brigade (Israel) =

Active Israeli Ground Forces formation

Coordinates: 58°22′46″N 13°50′41″E

- אגד ארטילרי 209
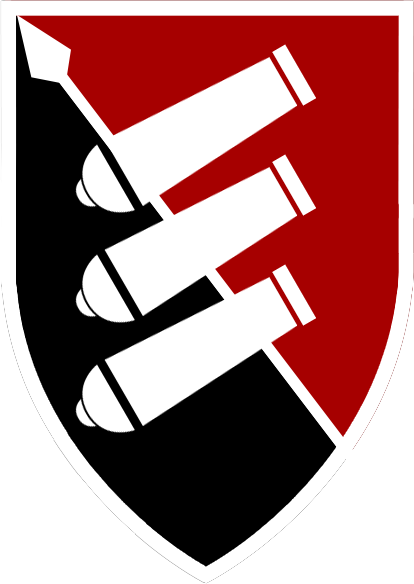
- Active: 1968–present
- Country: Israel
- Branch: Israeli Ground Forces
- Type: Reserve
- Part of: 210th Division
- Headquarters: Camp Ketziot
- Engagements: War of Attrition; Yom Kippur War; 1982 Lebanon War; 2006 Lebanon War

Commanders
- Commander: Col Eliran Dahan

The 209th Artillery Brigade (Note: Hebrew: אגד ארטילרי 209, "Brigade Artillery 209"; Arabic: الفرقة 209 للمدفعية, "Brigade 209 Artillery") is an Israeli Ground Forces reserve artillery brigade based in the Southern District. It has been active since 1968. The brigade is headquartered at Camp Ketziot.

== History ==
During the War of Attrition, the need for additional units became apparent. As a result, the brigade was established in 1968 as the first regular brigade of the Artillery Corps. Immediately upon establishment, the brigade was stationed in the Sinai Peninsula, where it took part in several battles against elements of the Egyptian Army under the command of the 252nd Division.

After the War of Attrition ended and the Yom Kippur War began, the brigade saw combat once more on the Egyptian front under the command of the same 252nd Division, serving until the end of the war.

In the 1980s the brigade would switch to a reserve unit, just in time for the beginning of the 1982 Lebanon War where the brigade partook in the Battle of Sultan Yacoub.

=== Organisation ===
- 209th Artillery Brigade "Kidon"
  - 647th Artillery Battalion (M270 "Menatetz" MLRS)
  - 7057th Artillery Battalion (M109 "Doher" self-propelled howitzers)
  - 8140th Artillery Battalion (M109 "Doher" self-propelled howitzers)
  - 8157th Artillery Battalion (M109 "Doher" self-propelled howitzers)
  - 8159th Target Acquisition Battalion
  - Signal Company

== Commanders ==
- 1968–1969: Col Yehuda Neot
- 1969–1970: Col Nati Sharoni
- 1970–1972: Col Yaakov Aknin
- 1972–1973: Col Moshe Peled
- 1973–1974: Col Yaakov Erez
- 1974–1975: Col Nahum Shalom
- 1975–1977: Col Shimon Ben-David
- 1977–1978: Col Oded Tira
- 1978–1979: Col Ehud Abramson
- 1979–1982: Col Shimon Rom
- 1982–1983: Col Doron Kadmiel
- 1983–1985: Col Arnon Ben-Ami
- 1985–1986: Col Yaakov Ben-Kiki
- 1987–1988: Col Moti Hood
- 1988–1993: Col Eival Gilady
- 1993–1995: Col Zvika Fox
- 1995–1999: Col Itzik Pedhatsur
- 1999–2001: Col Ilan Efrat
- 2001–2003: Col Benny Mar
- 2003–2005: Col Roy Riptin
- 2005–2008: Col Yossi Skal
- 2008–2011: Col Shimon Litman
- 2011–2013: Col Yuval Ben-Dov
- 2013–2015: Col Rami Abudrahm
- 2015–2017: Col Guy Marchisano
- 2017–2019: Col Yair Nathans
- 2019–2022: Col Zvi Ardan
- 2022–2024: Col Assaf Rahamim
- 2024–present: Col Eliran Dahan

== Sources ==
- Klu, Nissim (2 September 2021). "אגד ארטילרי 209 באוגדת הבשן 210 - כרטיס ביקור מערך הטנ"א בחטיבה". himush.co.il (in Hebrew). Archived from the original on 26 July 2024.
- IDF (18 April 2019). "טקס חילופי מפקד עוצבת הכידון". idf.il (in Hebrew).
