= Antiquities Law of the State of Israel of 1978 =

Israeli law

The Antiquities Law of the State of Israel of 1978 was put in place by Israel as a response to the problem of illegal activities with artifacts. It serves the purpose of describing the rights and obligations regarding the discovery and ownership of ancient coins or other antiquities in Israel, and the possibility of export of these antiquities. The punishment for breaking this law includes imprisonment for a term of two years or a fine of 100,000 pounds. It nationalized antiquities as an attempt to protect them.

== History ==
The legal sale of antiquities in Israel can be traced back to the Ottoman occupation of the region. The legal precedents for the trade still resembles that established during the British Mandate period.

The Ottoman Law of 1884 could be considered the first instance that archaeological material from the region was deemed important enough to pass legislation to ensure its safe keeping. The Ottoman Law of 1884 was made in response to the increase of foreign interest in the area and the looting of archaeological material from the Empire. Its main purpose was for regulating the trafficking of antiquities.

The 1884 Law established national ownership over all artifacts in the Ottoman Empire and sought to regulate scientific access to antiquities and sites. Under this law, all artifacts discovered during excavation were the property of the National Museum in Constantinople and were sent there. While the law can be seen as the first step towards regulation, it can also be seen as imperialism since the Ottoman Empire's desired to gain material from its territories rather than for the preservation of the archaeological legacy. By controlling archaeological goods and taxing the antiquities, the government effectively regulated European access to heritage.

While most of the provisions in the 1884 Law seemed reasonable, enforcing the law was virtually impossible. The expanse of the empire was too great that the Ottoman government did not have enough officials to oversee and implement the law. Chapter I Article 8 of the 1884 Law specifically prohibited the exporting of artifacts without the permission of the Imperial Museum. Even with this provision, many foreign archaeological missions continued exporting through a complex smuggling network that linked Jordan, Lebanon, Palestine, and Syria. These smuggling networks still exist today.

In the twentieth century came the British Mandate Period, which is sometimes referred to as the Golden Age of Archaeology. It made the region of modern-day Israel one of the most active centers of excavation and archaeological research in the world. The British Government enacted the Antiquities Proclamation in 1918 which served to recognize and protect the importance of the regions cultural heritage. Following the Antiquities Proclamation of 1918, archaeology and archaeological sites took on a more legal status rather than religious significance.

In 1948, the state of Israel was declared and kept in place most of the legislation enacted during the British Mandate period. This did not necessarily mean that Israel valued the British legal system, but Israeli leaders needed a legal framework to aid in nation building. In this time of civil unrest, looting was on the rise and there were reports of military looting of archaeological sites and museums. This led to the establishment of an Antiquities Unit in July 1948 that's purpose was the oversight of archaeological heritage.

After years of small, similar laws created, an Israeli antiquities law was finally enacted in 1978. Israel found its roots in the tangible remains of the past. Archaeological focus shifted from questions of chronology to a realm of trade relations, social complexity, and political structures of past societies. People began digging to find a piece of their heritage in order to connect with their ancestors.

== The Antiquities Law of the State of Israel of 1978 ==
According to Israeli law, all the artifacts in a licensed shop must have been unearthed before 1978, and have been resold or bequeathed since then. In reality, many of the objects were found recently, turned over to dealers, and registered under false numbers. Archaeologists and dealers agree that Israel's antiquities laws are avoided easily, so vessels and coins in stores likely came from a tomb plundered by antiquities thieves.

Amir Drori, a former general and later head of the Israel Antiquities Authority (IAA), wanted to ban antiquities trade, which he said creates demand that feeds theft. The authority oversees antiquities, supervises digs, issues permits to excavators and is responsible for restoring historic sites. The IAA also has the authority to decide who is allowed to be licensed to trade in antiquities, which is required in the 1978 Antiquities Law.

The Israel Antiquities Authority is aware that the registration number scam is taking place but lacks the resources to clamp down on it. There are 65 registered dealers in Israel and only 2.5 officers dedicated to enforcing Israel’s antiquity laws. There simply are not enough people to go around.

The Antiquities Law of the State of Israel of 1978 is the law put in place by Israel to eliminate the problem of illegal activities with artifacts. It serves the purpose of describing the rights and obligations regarding the discovery and ownership of ancient coins or other antiquities in Israel, and the possibility of export of these antiquities. The punishment for breaking this law includes imprisonment for a term of two years or a fine of IL100,000. It nationalized antiquities as an attempt to protect them. Article 2(c) states “Where an antiquity is discovered or found in Israel after the coming into force of this law, it shall within borders fixed by the Director of Antiquities become the property of the State.” Any antiquity exported from Israel requires the written approval of the Director of Antiquities. The 1978 Law includes the following:

If the antiquity is of national importance, written approval of the Minister of Education and Culture is required. All antiquities shipped abroad must be registered and shipped through a licensed dealer. The IAA reserves the right to confiscate any item not registered. Export of architectural fragments or other objects of stone such as columns, ossuaries or sarcophagi is not allowed; nor is the export of ancient inscribed objects or written materials. The sale or transfer of antiquities from a private collection or museum needs to be approved by the Director of Antiquities.”

Compared to the strict export laws of other Mediterranean countries, Israel is tolerant and antiquities can easily be exported. Anyone who goes against this export regulation, however, will be liable to imprisonment for a term of six months or pay a fine of IL30,000.

Article 37(a) of the 1978 Antiquities Law states that a person who defaces any antiquity or archaeological site subject to imprisonment for three years or a fine of IL150,000. The police do not help the IAA, and dealing with complaints about the destruction of sites or artifacts are not considered a priority. The lack of support from Israeli law enforcement is most likely due to their unawareness of the importance of archaeological heritage.

Article 15 of the 1978 Antiquities Law states that dealers can sell artifacts only if he has a license form the Director of Antiquities. Every licensed dealer has to keep a list of stock and register it annually. The IAA suspects that dealers replace every object sold a similar one, and assign it the same stock number.

When an antiquity is discovered or found in Israel, it becomes the property of the State. The person who discovers or finds an antiquity is required to notify the Director of the Israel Antiquities Authority within fifteen days of the discovery or find. A person claiming to have discovered or found the antiquity before the development of this law is required to provide proof. The Director may waive State ownership of an antiquity in writing.

No person is allowed to dig or search for antiquities, including the use of a metal detector, without a permit from the Antiquities Authority. If a person is found on an antiquity site with digging tools in his/her possession or nearby then the person is presumed to have intended to discover antiquities.

A person may only deal in antiquities if he is in possession of a license from the Director. The license indicates the place of business and will be displayed there in a conspicuous position. If a dealer sells an antiquity and then pleads that he did not know the piece was an antiquity, the plea will not be heard. A person is not allowed to sell or display for sale a replica or imitation of an antiquity without indication. A person is not allowed to take out of Israel an antiquity of national value unless he has a written approval of the Minister of Education and Culture.

== Looting ==
The Israel Antiquities Authority has a list of over 14,000 sites, but since 1967 more than 11,000 of these sites have been robbed. Looting ancient objects not only breaks the law, but also robs the objects of their scientific context. Since the restrictions are easily avoided, looting or the selling of fake pieces is on the rise to keep up with the growing market. A shop owner can easily take a pot and cover it with dirt to give the appearance of age, or reuse registration numbers after the original piece has been sold.

Looters' motives vary, but largely lie in money. Poverty is not a stranger in the Middle East. The Jerusalem Post reported that nearly one in three children in Israel lives below the poverty line. As of 2002 the general poverty rate in Jordan was reported at 14.2%. The West Bank economy has been hit hard by political conflict and poverty is rampant there. The IAA believes that ninety-nine percent of the thieves are shepherds and other inhabitants from poor villages surrounding the sites. This high percentage stems from economic deprivation of the villagers and poor law enforcement. The remaining one percent is made of Israeli and foreigner citizens who act as the middlemen.

Illegally excavated objects are then passed to a middleman. These middlemen have contacts in the small, poor villages and purchase the items for cheap. These objects are then sold to the dealers. The IAA tries to react against both thieves and middlemen, and approximately 70 to 100 of them are caught each year.

There are some other, more surprising, motives for looting. One of them is recreational. “People are very interested in getting out on the weekend in the land and it’s just something that they do,” said Dr. Kersel of DePaul University. “They take their families out, have a picnic and dig around on their hill.”

A third reason for looting is a practice called ‘resistance looting’ – Arabs looting to try to remove evidence of the prior presence of Jews or Christians. A particularly large-scale and contentious example is the destruction of archaeological remains on the Temple Mount in Jerusalem by the waqf (religious foundation) that controls the Muslim religious sites.

== Dealers ==
"All the objects that are on the market are stolen, period," said Denny Pinkus, an antiquities dealer with a store in the 4,000-year-old Mediterranean port city of Jaffa. Pinkus was the first antiquities dealer in Israel to be licensed by the Antiquities Authority (license No. 0001), and is recommended by the Ministry of Tourism.

Objects on sale at an authorized dealer should have a registration number, and customers should be able to get certificates of authenticity. There are numerous dealers in Israel, who are required to register with the Israel Antiquities Authority and keep an inventory of the artifacts they have for sale.

While dealers have to keep an inventory of everything they sell, those inventories are often kept vague. A listing that says that a dealer owns a pot dated to the Bronze Age doesn’t mean very much, since many pots of that era will be in their shop.

A tourist who buys an artifact will get a certificate of authenticity but will often forget an export permit. Many people are unaware that they are supposed to ask for an export permit, and the law does not require the sellers to offer the buyer an export permit. Without the export permit the sale isn’t officially registered and the dealer can take the registry number and use it on a new, and often looted, antiquity. Since the inventory descriptions are kept vague it isn’t hard to find an artifact that looks similar to the one that was just sold. Material that was looted as recently as a week ago could illegally enter the legal market through an exchange of registry numbers. The tourist could, of course, be caught trying to take the antiquity out of the country without a permit. But even if they are, it’s hard to fault the dealer. After all they are under no obligation to let tourists know that they need an export permit.

Dealers claim that most of their antiquities come from private collections and are purchased legally. By legal they mean from collections that were completed before 1978 when it was still legal to excavate on private property and collect artifacts. It is difficult to prove otherwise because it would take a large amount of resources to investigate the source of antiquities.

“I have a license in my window dated to 2001, no one has ever said anything and I am not changing it until the inspector makes me” (Dealer 28). Dealers speak of a disjunction between the renewal of a license, the backlog of processing at the IAA, and the opening of antiquities shops in the Old City. “I try to capitalize on the Christmas rush of tourists. If I have to shut because the IAA hasn’t renewed my license I can lose valuable revenue. I stay open, even if I haven’t received the official license, I know it will be months before an inspector checks and by that time I will have my license. It works every year and I know that everyone does it. If everyone else were open why would you close?”

== Tourists and collectors ==
One type of collector is the tourists who constitute 99 per cent of antiquities buyers. Many purchase a glass ornament, jar, coin or some other antiquity in one of the more than a hundred antiquities shops in Israel, the West Bank and Gaza Strip. People believe that for a fuller, more religious life they need to be exposed to their history, much of which is represented by objects. In high demand are pottery and coins from the period of the Bar-Kochva revolt around 132AD. Christian pilgrims seek objects from the Byzantine era, and the demand is greatest for items that are marked with a cross. Tourists do not care about the origin of an antiquity, their main concern is that the object is ‘old’. An IAA survey revealed that 80 per cent of people entering antiquities shops are tourists and that 67 per cent of those buy an antiquity.

Some collectors, the Israeli collectors, exert a strong influence on the political decision-making process concerning the domestic antiquities trade. They are influential public figures who have put pressure on parliament to not change the current law, which permits trading in antiquities. In 1987 Teddy Kollek, an important antiquities collector, the then mayor of Jerusalem, and previously Chairman of the Israel Museum Jerusalem board of directors, stated in a letter addressed to the Minister of Education and Culture that the banning of the antiquities trade would be ridiculous. He claims that the existence of legitimate sales galleries allows the IAA to supervise dealers and allows museums to purchase objects legally.

Kollek is not the only Israeli politician to collect antiquities. Moshe Dayan, a general and former minister, had an extreme interest in valuable archaeological finds. Dayan accumulated his extensive private collection through unauthorized and unscientific digs, using Israeli soldiers and army helicopters. While acting as Minister of Defence, he halted important anti-looting legislation. When the IAA discovered this, rather than arresting him, they seized his collection and displayed it in the Israel Museum Jerusalem. Both Kollek and Dayan did a lot to prevent the establishment of laws aimed at protecting national heritage, while at the same time protecting and increasing their own collections.

Antiquities displayed in Israeli museums come from authorized and unauthorized excavations. Some influential curators at the Israel Museum Jerusalem and the Eretz Israel Museum in Tel-Aviv support the antiquities trade because it allows them to continue buying antiquities on the open market. Preventing such a trade would severely constrict the museums’ sources and would create a dependency on the IAA. The Israel Museum Jerusalem's department of Israeli antiquities is made of pieces both lent or donated by the IAA, or confiscated from robbers or from dealers.

An example of the problem existing in Israel is when American tour guide and university lecturer John Lund was arrested on charges of illegally providing ancient antiquities for sale. The 70-year-old was arrested by the Israel Antiquities Authority and Israeli customs when he attempted to leave the country. He was in possession of ancient coins and lamps. He also had large checks that the IAA claimed were from his illegal selling of ancient artifacts to tourists who went on his tours. Lund was caught before selling antiquities in a Jerusalem hotel to members of his tour group who wanted to buy ancient artifacts, but was released with only a warning. When Lund continued offering ancient antiquities for sale, however, authorities decided to arrest him and seize the coins and checks they claim he had obtained illegally. After paying a $7,500 bond, Lund was allowed to leave Israel. He claims he had no idea that permission was needed to take antiquities out of the country.

== See also ==
- Council for Conservation of Heritage Sites in Israel, preserves sites from 1700 onwards not covered by the Antiquities Law
- Israel Antiquities Authority, governmental authority responsible for enforcing the Antiquities Law
