= Battle of IJsselmeer =

Part of the Eighty Years' War (1572)

The Battle on Skates
- Part of the Eighty Years' War
Date	1572
Location	IJsselmeer, near Haarlem
Result	Dutch rebels victory

Belligerents
Dutch rebels · Geuzen	Spain

Commanders and leaders
Geuzen	(Spanish Empire) Alba

Strength
Unknown	Unknown

Casualties and losses
Low	Many hundreds dead

The Battle of IJsselmeer, also known as the Battle on Skates, was a notable military engagement during which the Duke of Alva dispatched his son, Don Frederick, to seize control of the city of Haarlem. The city was mostly surrounded by water, with ships positioned nearby that had become frozen in with the icy conditions. Upon Don Frederick's arrival, he dispatched a contingent of soldiers to capture these stranded vessels.

However, as these soldiers approached the ships, they encountered a group of armed Dutch forces who were equipped with skates. In response to the Dutch soldiers' advance, they swiftly withdrew while bullets were exchanged between the two sides. The uneven icy terrain proved challenging for conventional foot movement, but the Dutch skaters effectively glided over the ice, avoiding harm, and fired bullets at their adversaries. They skillfully alternated between shooting and retreating, maintaining a tactical advantage.

The outcome of the battle was severe losses for the Spanish forces, resulting in hundreds of casualties. Upon receiving news of this setback, the Duke promptly issued an order for the procurement of seven thousand pairs of skates, presumably to equip his troops for similar icy encounters in the future.

== See also ==
- Ski warfare
