= 1st Northern Ski Battalion =

- 1ste Nordenfieldske Skieløber-Bataillon
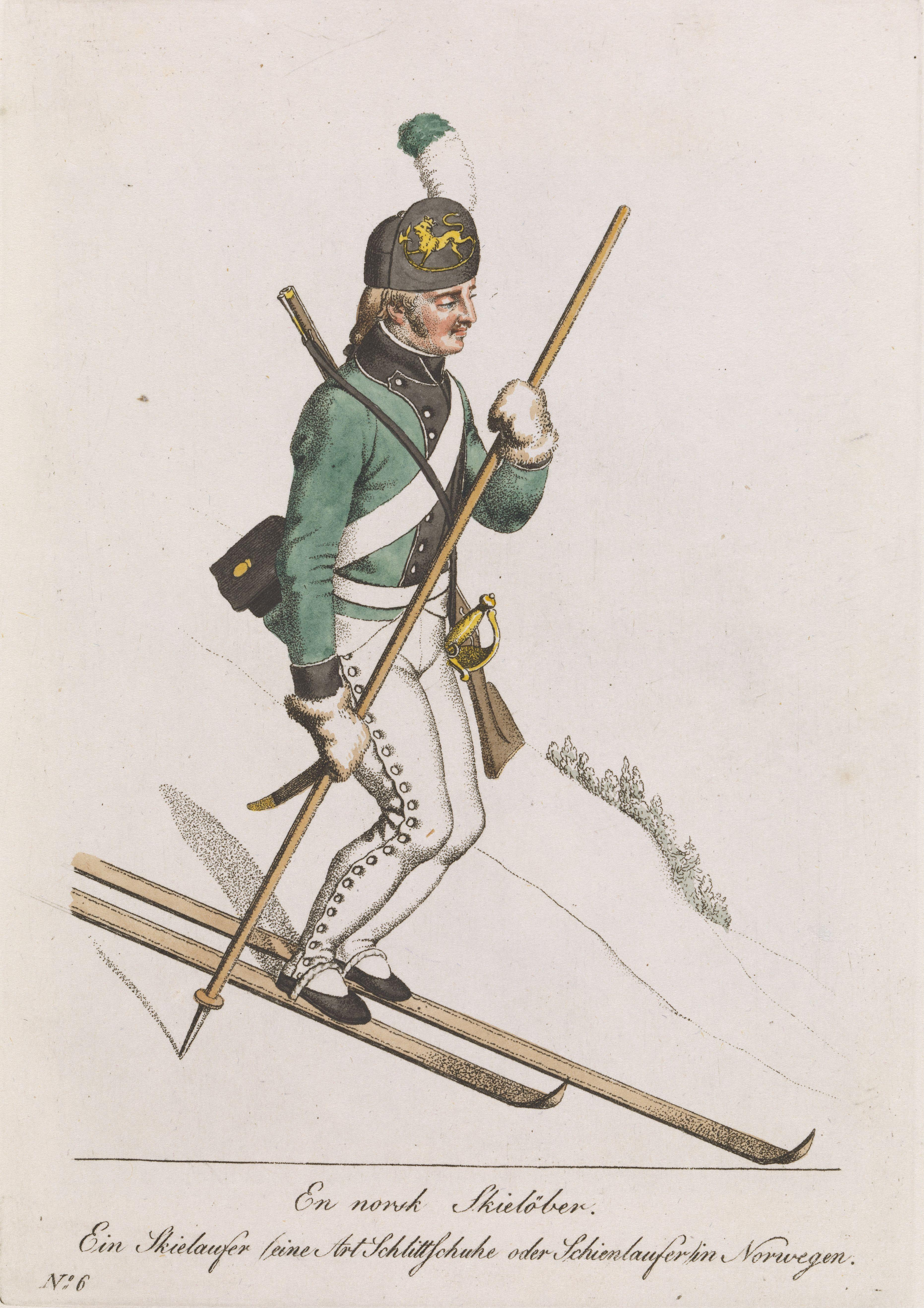
- An infantryman of the regiment skiing
- Active: 1814 - 1820's
- Country: (Denmark–Norway) Denmark-Norway
- Type: Infantry
- Colors: Green and White

The 1st Northern Ski Battalion (Norwegian: 1ste Nordenfieldske Skieløber-Bataillon) was a Norwegian ski infantry unit of the Norwegian Army. The battalion was part of the Norwegian tradition of employing ski troops, specialized soldiers trained to operate in the mountainous and snow-covered terrain of Norway. Their primary roles were reconnaissance, skirmishing, border defense, and reaching places where normal infantry could not.

== History ==
After the Treaty of Kiel and Norway's separation from Denmark, the existing Nordenfjeldske Skiløber Bataljon was divided into:

- 1ste Nordenfieldske Skieløber-Bataillon
- 2den Nordenfieldske Skieløber-Bataillon The 1st Battalion continued the older unit tradition, while the 2nd Battalion was newly formed from transferred personnel and equipment.

In 1818, the Norwegian Army was reorganized. The ski troops were reduced, and only three ski companies were retained.

The remaining military ski organization was finally abolished by royal resolution on 10 January 1826, when ski exercises were discontinued.

== Uniform ==
The battalion wore the Trondhjemske Skiløber uniform M1808, a distinctive green ski troop uniform developed in Trondheim. They also wore green trousers, yellow buttons, white fold-down cuffs, and a black shako with green details for enlisted men.
