= Alpinist Unit =

- Yehidat Ha'Alpinistim
- Founded: 1974 - Present
- Country: Israel
- Allegiance: Israel Defense Forces
- Branch: Israeli Ground Forces
- Type: Sayeret
- Role: Clandestine operation Cold-weather warfare Counterinsurgency; Direct action Electronic warfare Force protection HUMINT; Irregular warfare Long-range penetration Medical evacuation Military intelligence Mountain warfare Patrolling; Raiding; Reconnaissance; Ski warfare Special operations Special reconnaissance Tracking
- Part of: 810th Heharim Regional Brigade; 210th Bashan Division; Northern Command

The Alpinist Unit Hebrew: יחידת האלפיניסטים, Yehidat Ha'Alpinistim) is an Israeli special forces mountain infantry reserve unit of the 810th Heharim Regional Brigade, under the command of the 210th Division "Bashan", Northern Command focusing on clandestine operations, cold-weather and mountain warfare, long-range penetration, medical evacuation for battlefield injuries or emergencies, reconnaissance and tracking targets, and difficult terrain warfare in the northern front, especially Mt. Hermon.

The Alpinists are trained in aspects of cold-weather and mountain warfare. The unit was established in 1983.

Their standard equipment includes M4 carbine assault rifles, the Israeli TAR-21 Tavor assault rifle, "Negev" light machine gun and sniper rifles, mostly the M24 and SR-25.

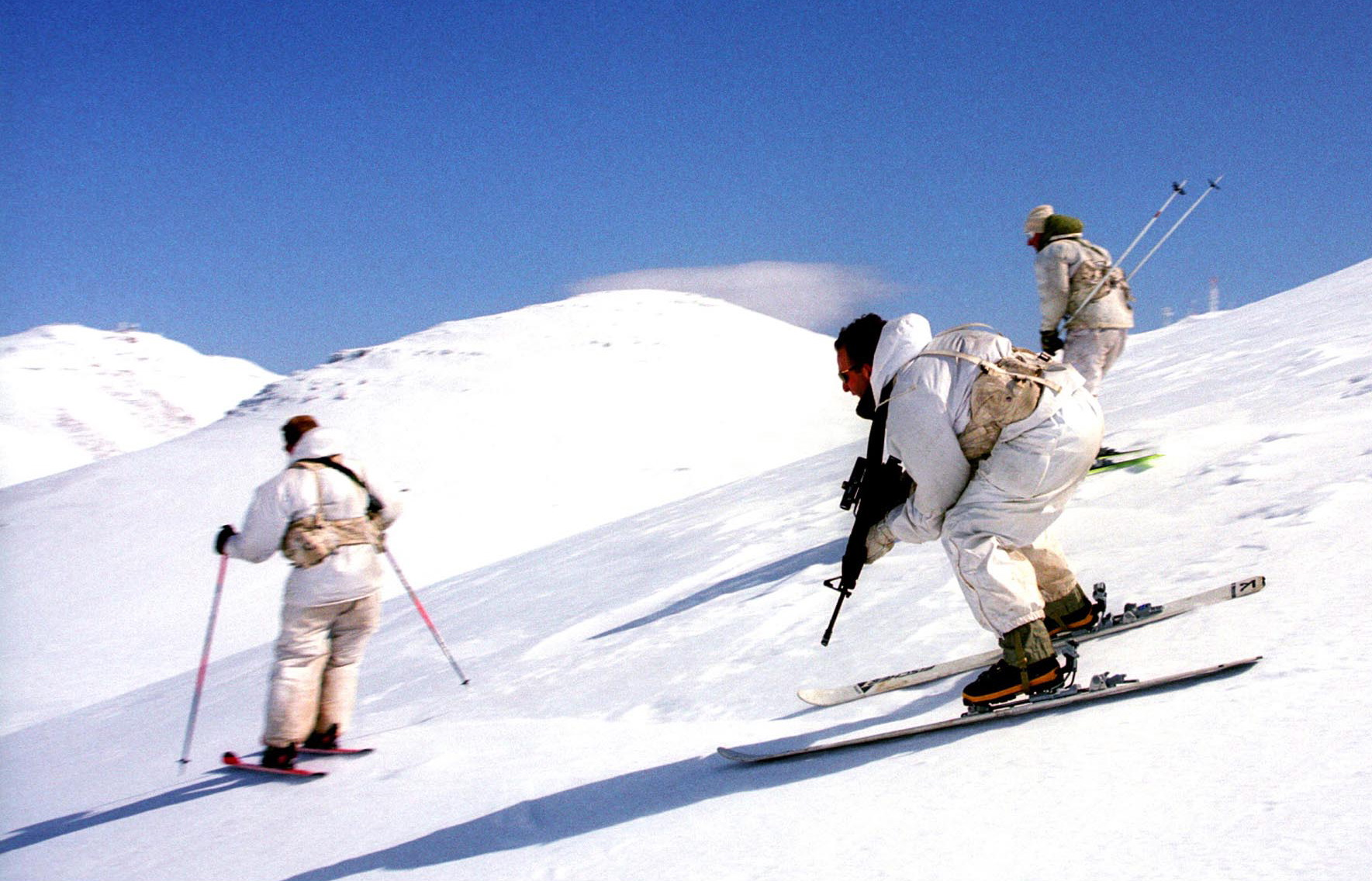
Alpinists during a training session in Mount Hermon
