= Dan Laner =

Israeli general (1922–1988)

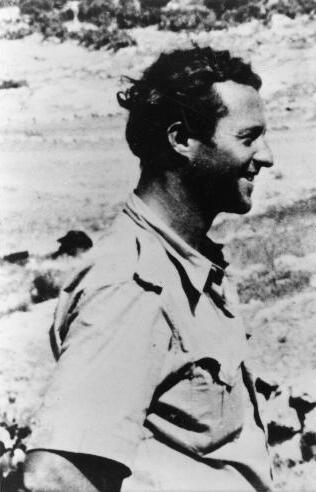
- Native name: דן לינר
- Born: May 29, 1922; Vienna, Austria
- Died: March 16, 1988 (aged 65)
- Allegiance: Palmach, British Army, Israel Defense Forces
- Service years: 1941–1951, 1965–1972
- Rank: Major General
- Commands: Yiftach Brigade, Golani Brigade, Carmeli Brigade, 188th Armored Brigade, Northern Command (Deputy Commander), 252nd Division, 210th Division
- Conflicts: World War II; War of Independence; Six-Day War; Yom Kippur War

Dan Laner (also spelled Leiner/Lainer) (Hebrew: דן לינר; 1922–1988) was an Israeli general who fought in almost all of Israel's early wars, and had significant roles in the War of Independence, the Six-Day War, and the Yom Kippur War.

== Early life ==
He was born in 1922 to a Jewish family, in Vienna, Austria, as Ernest Leiner (sometimes given as 'Loehner'). In 1938, after the annexation of Austria by Nazi Germany, he left Austria. In 1940 he gained admission to Mandatory Palestine, joining the Yishuv; he was later one of the founders of the kibbutz Neot Mordechai.

== Military career ==
He joined the Palmach in 1942, becoming a member of the so-called 'German Squad'. He later notionally left the Palmach, volunteering for the SOE's program of agents inserted into Occupied Europe. After parachute and wireless training, at the end of April, 1944, he jumped into Slovenia, at Gorica. He immediately joined up with the Yugoslav Partisans, and took part in numerous operations with them. In one, he was captured, but managed to escape after an hour or so.

After the end of WWII, he returned to Palestine, took the platoon commander's course, and was appointed second-in-command of the Palmach's 1st Battalion. During the waning days of the British Mandate, he took part in a number of Palmach operations, including the 'Night of the Bridges', the 'Night of the Trains', and attacks on British radar stations (including the attack on the Mount Carmel station). In 1947 he took command of the 1st Battalion, which he led into the Battle of Mishmar HaEmek, in April, 1948.

Later, after the British completed their withdrawal, Laner and the 1st Battalion were sent against the Lebanese at Al-Malkiyya, in May, 1948. In what Kimche described as "one of the best battles of the war", Laner’s force, out-numbered about 6:1, conducted a successful fighting retreat. Later, he was appointed battalion commander and brigade deputy commander in the Yiftach Brigade; he also took part in Operation Danny.

After the War of Independence, he transferred to the newly created IDF; among his first duties was the role head of delegation to ceasefire talks with Jordan. In 1950 he was promoted to colonel, and took command of the Golani Brigade. However, a year later he left permanent service with the IDF, and returned to his kibbutz, but remained in the reserves; while there, from 1950 to 1964, he commanded the 188th Armored Brigade.

In 1965 he returned to permanent service, and as a brigadier general, was appointed deputy commander of the Northern Command. In this role, he played a major part in planning the seizure of the Golan Heights in the Six-Day War. In action there, he commanded the entire division-sized task force which broke into the Northern Golan.

After the war, in June, 1970, he was promoted to command of the 252nd 'Sinai' Division. He retired from regular service in February, 1972, and then helped set up the 210th Division in the reserves.

That unit played a major role in the battles on the Golan in the Yom Kippur War. Like all other Israeli reserve units, its mobilization was delayed by the lack of intelligence warning. Laner himself thought, early on, that the situation on the Southern Golan was irretrievable. Nevertheless, he stationed himself near the Arik Bridge, and fed units up as fast as they arrived, in no particular order. Units from Laner’s division played a major role in stabilizing the situation on the Southern Golan, and then evicting the Syrians from their gains. It went on to play a role in the subsequent attacks on the Syrians; they also stopped a major counterattack by Iraqi reinforcements.

== Personal life ==
He was married to Tirza (Teresa); they had a son and two daughters. After his death in 1988, he was buried in the cemetery of the Neot Mordechai group, where he had continued to live when not in the army.

There are streets named after him in Tel Aviv and Beit Shemesh.

== Sources ==
- Bartov, Hanoch (1981). Dado: 48 Years and 20 Days. Translated by Ina Friedman. Israel: Ma'ariv Book Guild.
- Dupuy, Trevor (1978). Elusive Victory: The Arab-Israeli Wars, 1947-1974. New York: Harper & Row. ISBN 0-06-011112-7.
- Hammel, Eric (1992). Six Days in June: How Israel Won the 1967 Arab-Israeli War. New York: Charles Scribner's Sons. ISBN 0-684-19390-6.
- Herzog, Chaim (1975). The War of Atonement: October 1973. Boston: Little, Brown and Company. ISBN 0-316-35900-9.
- Kimche, Jon and David (1960). Both Sides of the Hill: Britain and the Palestine War. London: Secker and Warburg.
- Oren, Michael B. (2002). Six Days of War: June 1967 and the Making of the Modern Middle East. New York: Oxford University Press. ISBN 0-19-515174-7.
- Rabinovich, Abraham (2004). The Yom Kippur War: The Epic Encounter That Transformed the Middle East. New York: Schocken Books. ISBN 0-8052-4176-0.
- Avriel, Ehud (1975). Open the Gates! A Personal Story of "Illegal" Immigration to Israel. New York: Atheneum. ISBN 0-689-10590-8.
