= 210th Division (Israel) =

210th "Bashan" Division
- עוצבת הבשן
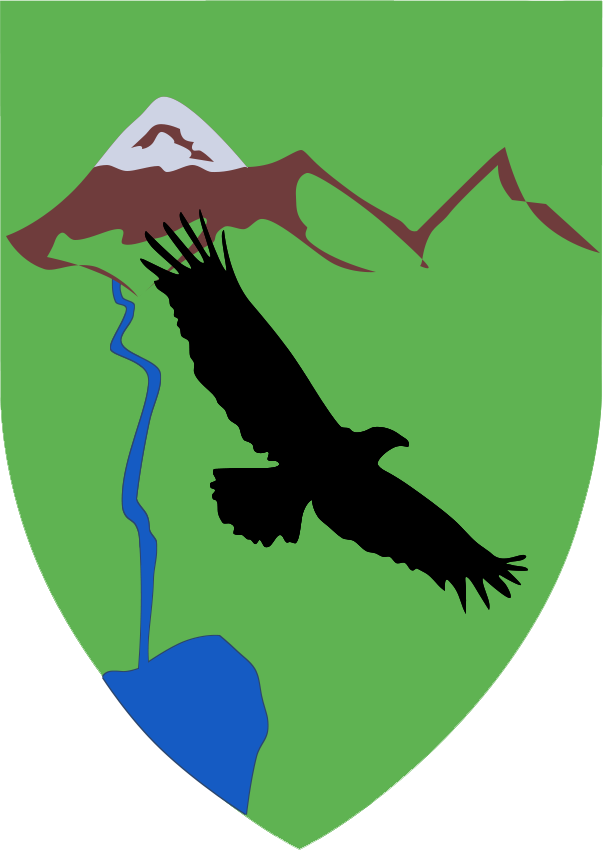
- The 210th Division "Bashan" patch
- Active: 1973 – present
- Country: Israel
- Branch: Israeli Ground Forces
- Type: Combine Arms
- Size: Division
- Part of: Northern Command
- Garrison/HQ: Camp Yitzhak
- Nickname: The Bashan Division
- Engagements: Yom Kippur War; 2006 Lebanon War; Iron Swords War; 2024 Israeli invasion of Lebanon; Israeli invasion of Syria (2024–present)

Commanders
- Current commander: Yair Pelai
- Notable commanders: Dan Laner; Avigdor Kahalani; Gabi Ashkenazi; Gadi Eizenkot

The 210th Division "Bashan" (Hebrew: עוצבת הבשן; Utzbat HaBashan) is a territorial division in the Israel Defense Forces' Northern Command, responsible for the front with Syria. The division was formed after the 366th Division "Netiv Ha-Esh/Path of Fire" of Southern Command was disbanded.

The division participated in the Israeli invasion of Syria after the fall of the Assad regime.

== Division organization ==
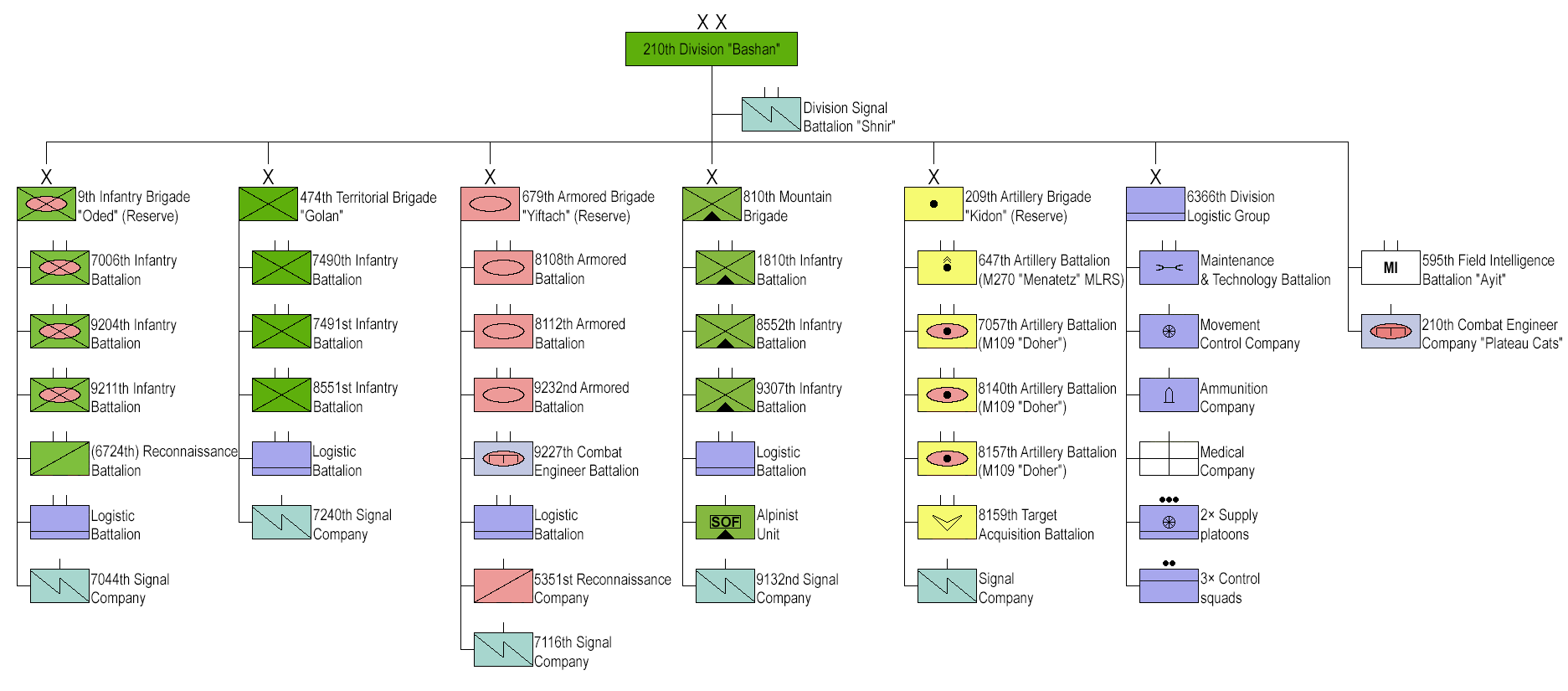
210th Division "Bashan" organization as of November 2026

- 210th Division "Bashan"
  - 9th Infantry Brigade "Oded" (Reserve)
    - 7006th Infantry Battalion
    - 9204th Infantry Battalion
    - 9211th Infantry Battalion
    - 6724th Reconnaissance Battalion
    - Logistic Battalion
    - 7044th Signal Company
  - 474th Territorial Brigade "Golan" – Golan Heights sector
    - 7490th Infantry Battalion
    - 7491st Infantry Battalion
    - 8551st Infantry Battalion "Magen David" (Reserve)
    - 7240th Signal Company
  - 679th Armored Brigade "Yiftach" (Reserve)
    - 8108th Armored Battalion
    - 8112th Armored Battalion
    - 9232nd Armored Battalion
    - 9227th Combat Engineering Battalion
    - 5679th Logistic Battalion
    - 5351st Reconnaissance Company
    - 7116th Signal Company
  - 810th Mountain Brigade
    - 1810th Infantry Battalion
    - 8552th Infantry Battalion "Magen Yehonatan" (Reserve)
    - 9307th Infantry Battalion
    - Logistic Battalion
    - Alpinist Unit
    - 9132nd Signal Company
  - 209th Artillery Brigade "Kidon" (Reserve)
    - 647th Artillery Battalion (M270 "Menatetz" MLRS)
    - 7057th Artillery Battalion (M109 "Doher" self-propelled howitzers)
    - 8140th Artillery Battalion (M109 "Doher" self-propelled howitzers)
    - 8157th Artillery Battalion (M109 "Doher" self-propelled howitzers)
    - 8159th Target Acquisition Battalion
    - Signal Company
  - 6366th Division Logistics Group
  - Division Signals Battalion "Shnir"
  - 595th Field Intelligence Battalion "Ayit/Eagle"
  - 210th Combat Engineer Company "Plateau Cats"
