= 366th Division (Israel) =

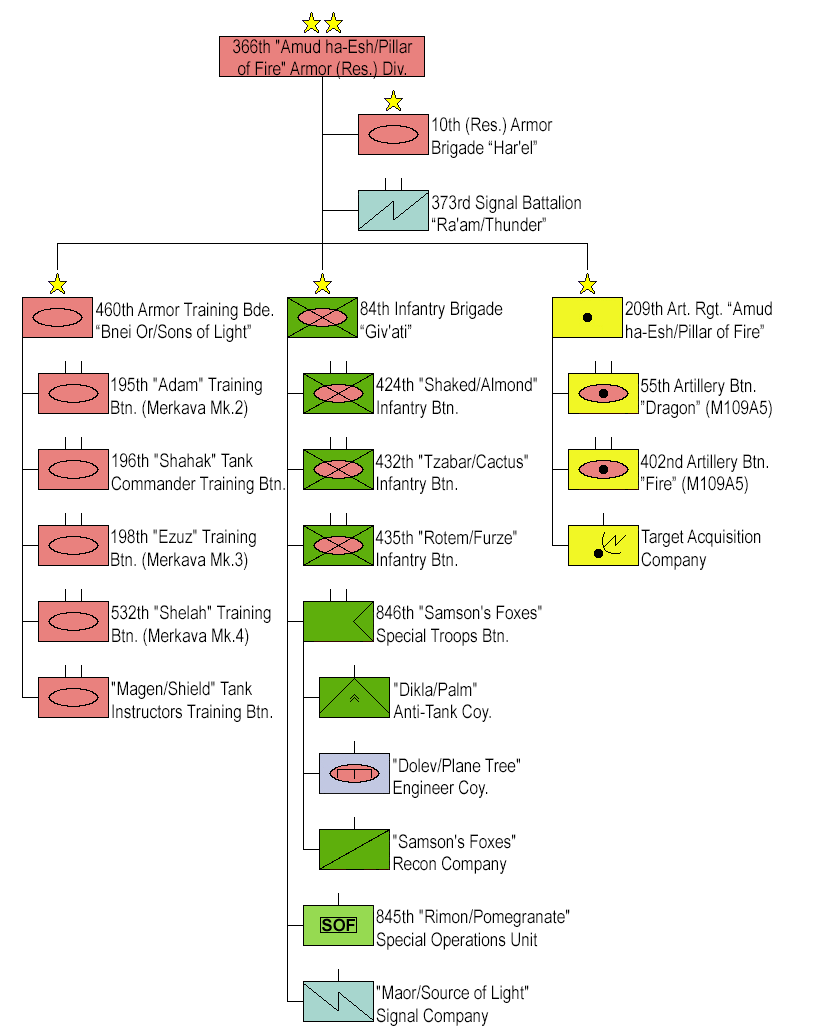
366th Armored Division structure (click to enlarge)

The Israel Defense Forces 366th (Reserve) Armored Division, also known as the "Path of Fire" (Hebrew: נתיב האש, Netiv Ha-Esh) Division, was a reserve armored division of the IDF. It was subordinate to the Northern Regional Command until January 2014, when the units of the division were used to create the 210th "Bashan" (Territorial) Division.
