= Yehoshua Dorfman =

Israeli military officer

Yehoshua (Shuka) Dorfman
- יהושע דורפמן
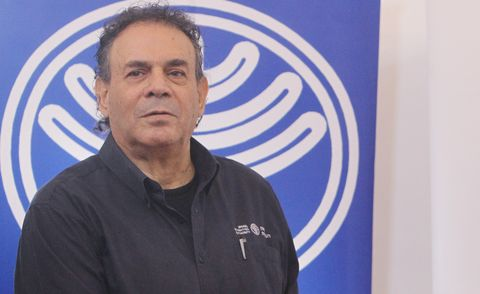
- Photo of Shuka Dorfman
- Born: 1950
- Died: July 31, 2014 (aged 64)
- Burial place: Gedera
- Alma mater: Haifa University (Political Science)
- Spouse: Talma Dorfman
- Children: Three sons
- Military career
- Allegiance: Israel
- Branch: Israel Defense Forces
- Rank: Brigadier General
- Nickname: Shuka
- Commands: Artillery Corps
- Conflicts: War of Attrition; Lebanon War; Yom Kippur War; Operation Accountability
- Other work: Director General of the Israel Antiquities Authority

Yehoshua (Shuka) Dorfman (Hebrew: יהושע דורפמן; 1950 - 31 July 2014) was an Israeli military officer and the Director General of the Israel Antiquities Authority (IAA).

== Career ==
Dorfman had practically no formal archaeological training, his academic training being in Political Science, which he studied at Haifa University. He served in a number of military positions, reaching the rank of Brigadier General. He saw combat in the War of Attrition, the Lebanon War and the Yom Kippur War. As chief artillery officer, he commanded the artillery corps during the Operation Accountability attack against Lebanon. He retired from the IDF in 2000.

Dorfman headed the IAA for almost 15 years, from November 2000 until his death in 2014, his tenure as director general having been extended twice. During his time as director, the organization expanded the scope of archaeological rescue excavations of sites threatened by land development and construction. He promoted conservation efforts and the development of excavated sites for public access. The director advocated for the use of advanced technology in the field and helped accelerate its implementation in research and conservation. He stressed the archaeological importance of the Dead Sea Scrolls, and under his tenure, they were digitized and made accessible to the public.

== Death ==
After a long battle with illness, Dorfman died on 31 July 2014. He left behind a wife, Talma, and three sons. He was laid to rest in Gedera.

== Bibliography ==
- מתחת לפני השטח: יחסי הגומלין בין פוליטיקה לארכיאולוגיה בישראל (Below the Surface: The Interaction Between Politics and Archeology in Israel)
