= Council for Conservation of Heritage Sites in Israel =

Israeli nonprofit association

Logo of the organization, depicting the original building of Herzliya Hebrew Gymnasium; demolition of this building in 1959 ignited widespread recognition of the importance of conserving historical landmarks in Israel

The Council for Conservation of Heritage Sites in Israel (Hebrew: המועצה לשימור אתרי מורשת בישראל), also the Society for the Preservation of Israel Heritage Sites (SPIHS), is a registered nonprofit non-governmental association (Hebrew: עמותה, amutah) acting to protect and preserve buildings and sites of historic value "related to Israel's pathway to independence", built in or after the year 1700 and not covered by the national Antiquities Law.

== History ==
A decision of the Knesset Education Committee led to the Society for the Protection of Nature in Israel (SPNI) establishing SPIHS in 1984; SPIHS activated under the auspices of the SPNI until the end of 2007, in January 2008 becoming an independent NGO. The association maintains its own list of heritage sites, which should not be confused with the list of National Heritage Sites defined by the Israeli government's "Landmarks" program (Hebrew: ציוני דרך).
