= Sports in Jammu and Kashmir =

Overview of sports traditions and activities

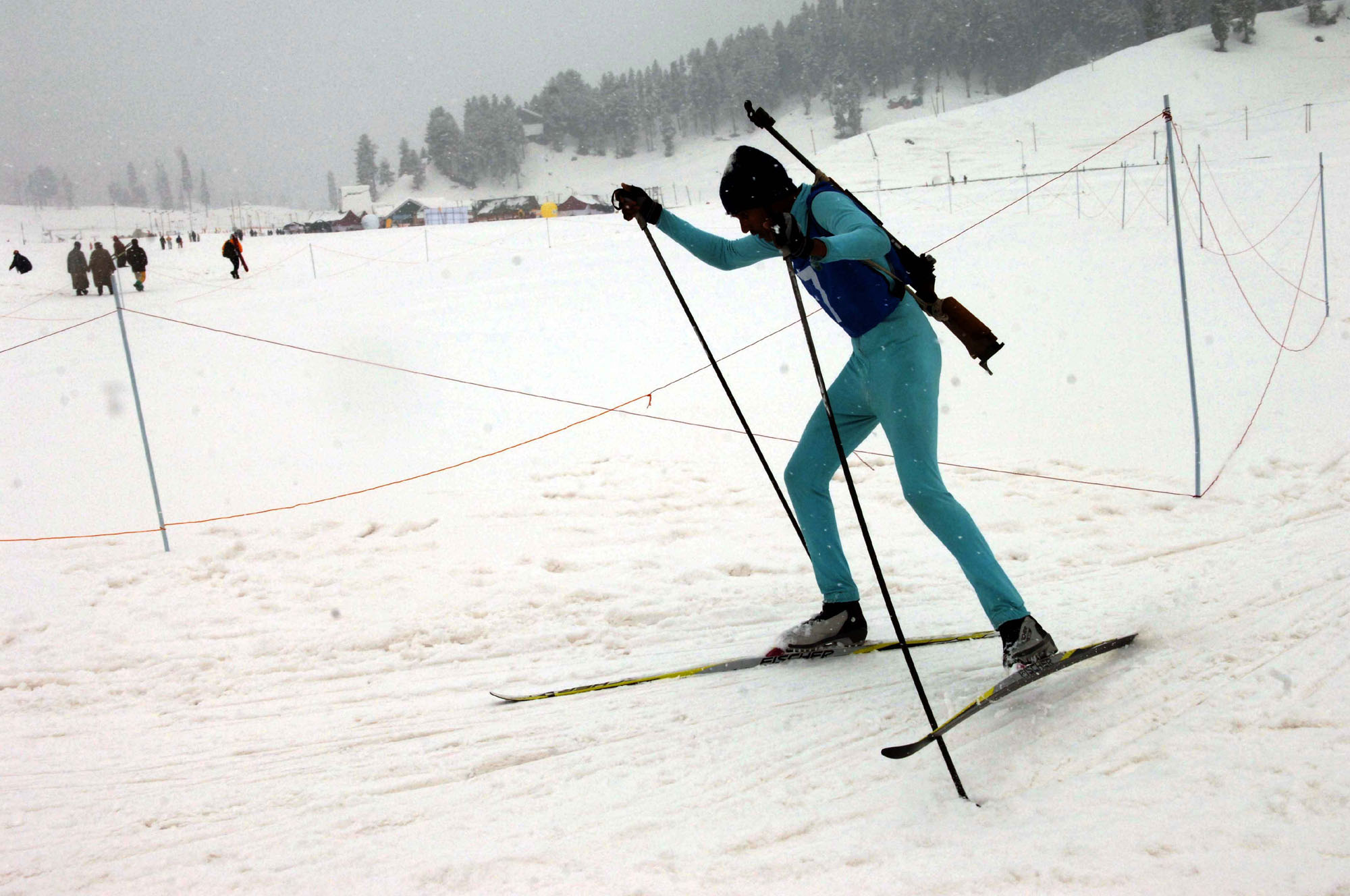
A ski racer at the 5th National Winter Games at Gulmarg, Jammu & Kashmir in 2008

Popular sports in Jammu and Kashmir include cricket, football and winter sports along with sports like golf, water sports, Ice stock sport and adventure sports. The National Winter Games have been held in Gulmarg in 1996, 2004 and 2009. The first Khelo India Winter Games were held in February and March 2020 in Leh and Gulmarg. Jammu and Kashmir won the most gold medals (26 gold, 29 silver, 21 bronze) while the Indian Army team came second with 8 gold medals. The second edition of the winter games were also held successfully in Gulmarg in 2020 with Jammu and Kashmir coming first and Karnataka second.

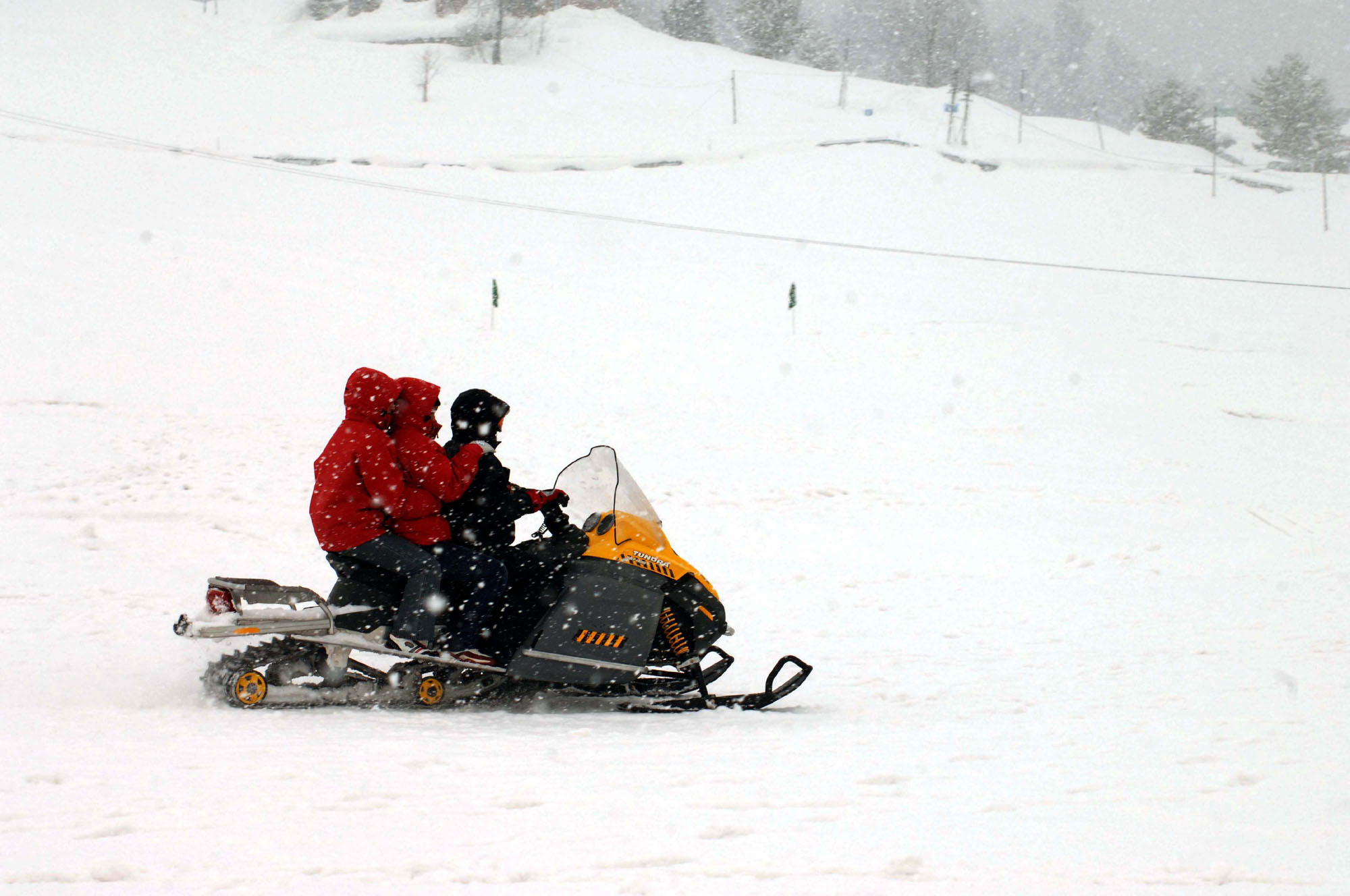
Snowmobile riders enjoying themselves at the 5th National Winter Games at Gulmarg, Kashmir in 2008.

Jammu and Kashmir has produced numerous international and national level players including Gul Dev, the first Kashmiri Olympian, numerous Indian Premier League cricketers such as Abdul Samad and Mithun Manhas, icestockers such as Aadil Manzoor Peer, Mohammad Sarfaraz and Faheem Masood Shah, sharp shooter Chain Singh and footballer Mehrajuddin Wadoo among others.

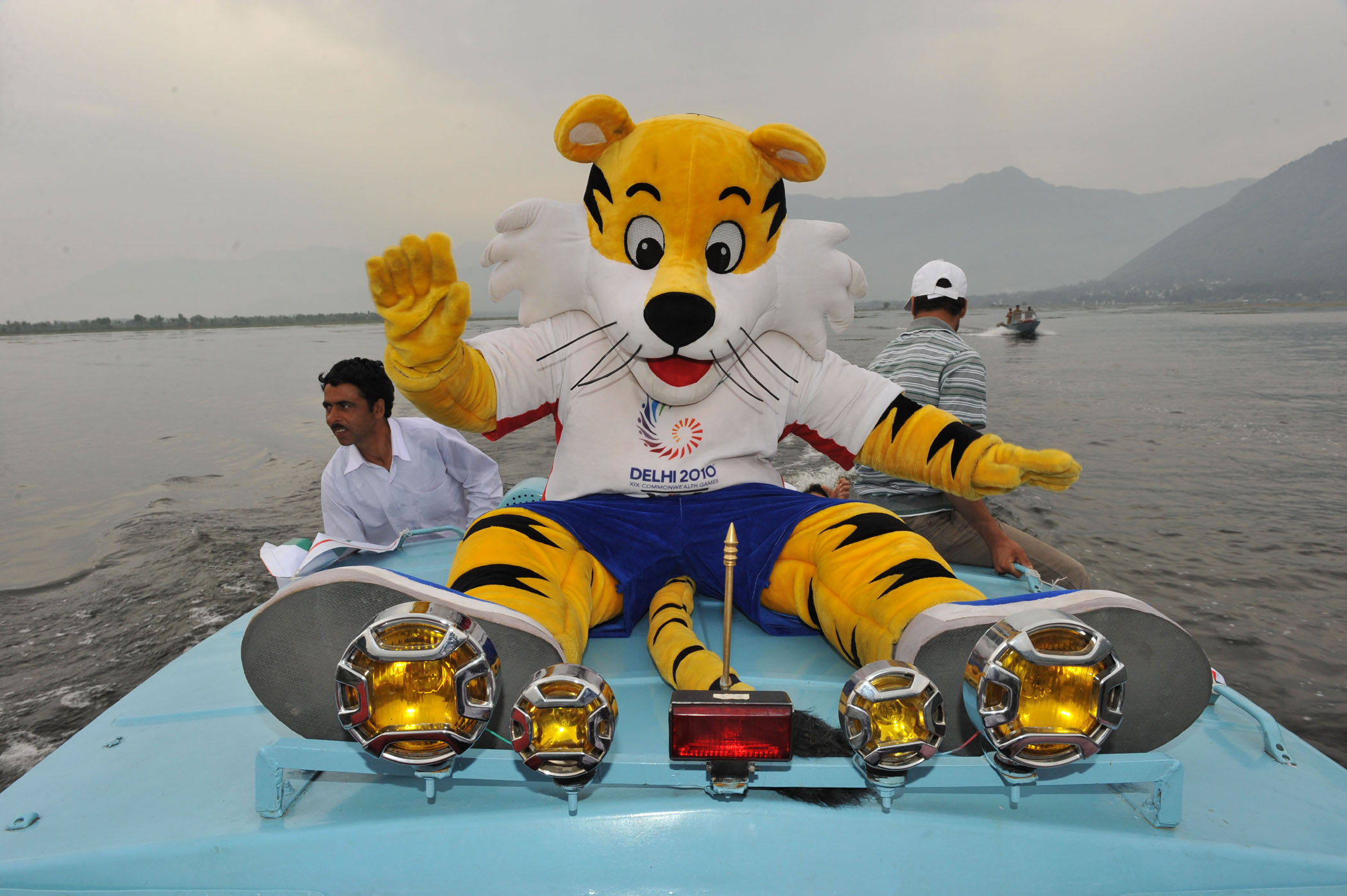
Shera, the mascot of the Commonwealth Games Delhi 2010 takes a ride on Dal Lake

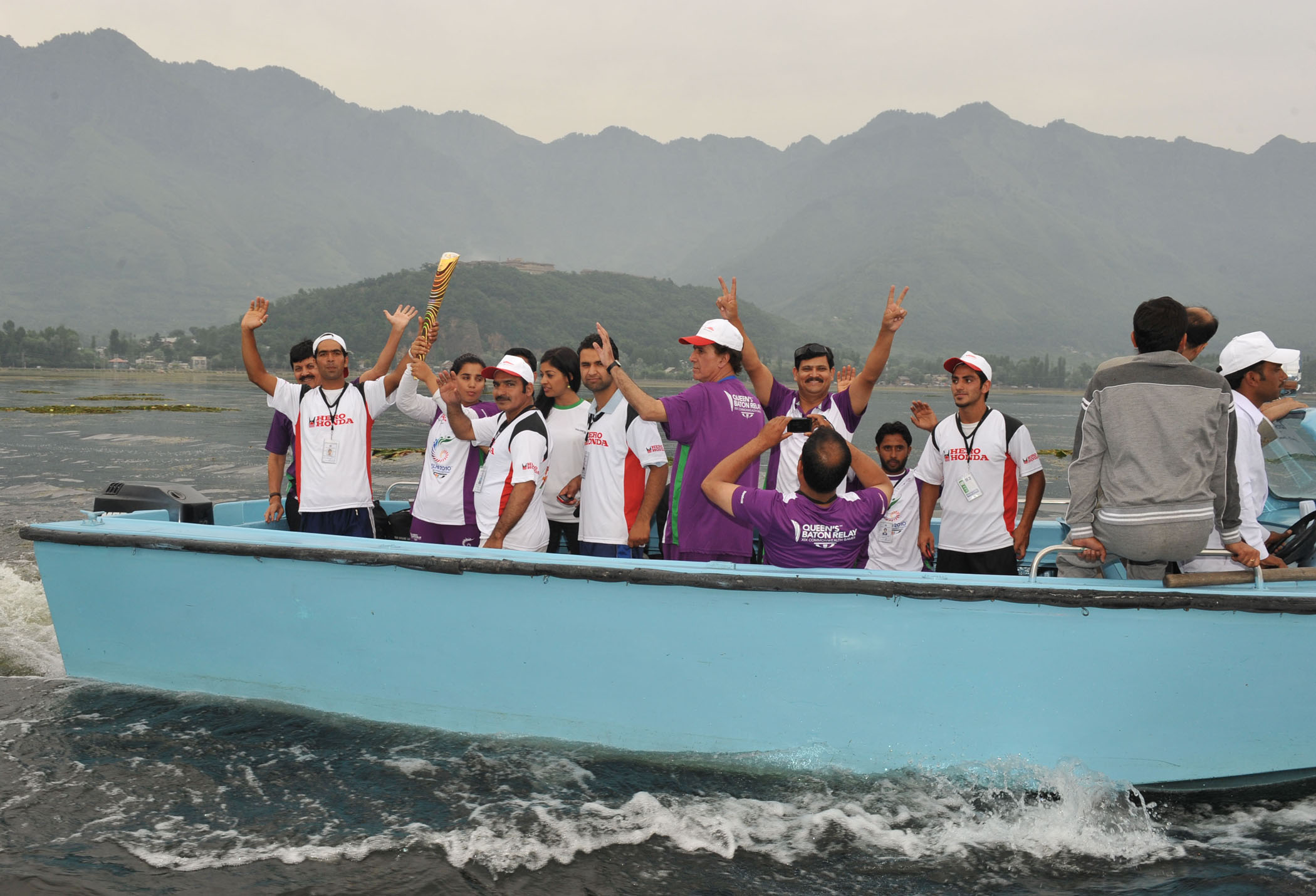
The sports fraternity of Srinagar taking the Queen's Baton for the Delhi 2010 Commonwealth Games for a ride in Srinagar

== Background ==
=== Princely state of Jammu and Kashmir ===
In 1883, in the princely state of Jammu and Kashmir, hunting was still a sport though restrictions on what could be killed and where game could be hunted had started to take force. In A. E. Ward's Sportsman's Guide to Kashmir and Ladak, Ward writes, "in Kashmir there exist two or three hundred men who call themselves shikaris, but there are not two dozen who are worthy of the name. In no other part of India have I come across such an arrant collection of impostors." Game included markhor, ibex, ther, serow, goral, burhel, deer, antelope, yak, wolf, sambhur and others. By the time Ward came out with the fourth edition of his book in 1896 he notes that there is "but little sport to be got in the whole of the Kashmir dominions". By 1942 the Jammu and Kashmir Game Preservation Action came into force which outlined the conditions under which game could be killed.

=== State and UT of Jammu and Kashmir ===
Against the background of the Kashmir conflict and tension in the state, government initiatives in the sports sector are promoted specifically trying to draw the youth away from the conflict. The Indian Army also conducts sporting activities for the youth in the region through various welfare initiatives such as Operation Sadbhavana. Lack of infrastructure, politicization, lack of support are other issues hampering growth of the sports in the region.

Abid Hussain, a sports journalist in Kashmir and founder of the monthly sports magazine Kashmir Sports Watch, in a 2020 interview with Mumbai Mirror said that sports tournaments in Kashmir are organised by both the army and police, as well as mainstream political parties, even the Hurriyat, and once a player takes part in one of these tournaments, the players along with their families are labelled "pro-India" or "pro-Pakistan" accordingly. Even if a sportsperson plays for India they face stigmatization from separatists.

On 24 September 2020, the one-year anniversary of the Fit India Movement, Prime Minister Narendra Modi digitally interacted with sportspersons across the country, including Afshan Asiq. Afshan is the captain of Kashmir Valley's first Jammu and Kashmir women's state football team. In 2017, she had been photographed stone pelting, which had appeared in headlines across the country.

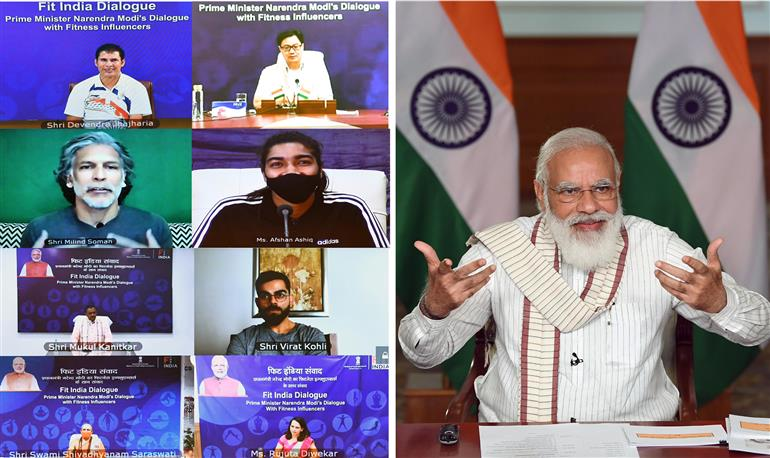
Prime Minister Modi interacting with the various fitness enthusiasts during the Fit India Dialogue event, via video conferencing in September 2020. Visible is Afshan Asiq.

== Notable athletes from Jammu and Kashmir ==
International, national and state level notable players from the region.

Known as	Real name	District	Sport(s) category	Career
Gul Dev	Gul Mustafa Dev	Srinagar	Skiing	1988–present
Aamir Aziz	Aamir Aziz	Srinagar	Cricket	2015–present
Armless cricketer	Amir Hussain Lone	Anantnag	Cricket	2013–present
Chain Singh	Chain Singh	Doda district	Shooting sports	2007–present
Baramulla's supergirl	Iqra Rasool	Baramulla	Cricket	2015–present
Mehrajuddin Wadoo	Mehrajuddin Wadoo	Srinagar	Football	1996–present
Mithun Manhas	Mithun Manhas	Doda district	Cricket	1998–present
Abid Nabi	Abid Nabi	Srinagar	Cricket	2004–present
Abdul Samad	Abdul Samad	Rajouri	Cricket	2019–present
Parvez Rasool	Parvez Rasool	Anantnag district	Cricket	2009–present
Umran Malik	Umran Malik	Jammu	Cricket	2021–present
Syed Aadi	Aadil Manzoor Peer	Kupwara district	ice stock sport	2012–present
Mohammad Sarfaraz	Mohammad Sarfaraz	srinagar district	ice stock sport	2012–present
Tajamul Islam	Tajamul Islam	Bandipora	Kickboxing	2016–present
Rasikh Salam	Rasikh Salam	Kulgam district	Cricket	2018–present
Jasia Akhter	Jasia Akhtar	Shopian	Cricket	2013–present
Akbar Khan	Akbar Khan	Baramulla	Cycling	2011–present
Palak Kaur	Palak Kour Bijral	Jammu	Rhythmic gymnastics	2003–present

== Sporting activities ==
=== Cricket in Jammu and Kashmir ===
Cricket is the second most popular sport in Jammu and Kashmir after football. Recently Ifran Pathan was made the mentor and coach of the Jammu and Kashmir cricket team. The team participates in the events such as the Ranji Trophy and Vijay Hazare Trophy. Popular players to have come from the region include Parvez Rasool, Abdul Samad, Mithun Manhas, Rasikh Salam and Manzoor Dar who have played T20 IPL matches for team such as Sunrisers Hyderabad and Kings XI Punjab. Other cricketers from Jammu and Kashmir include Jasia Akhtar who was the first women from Jammu and Kashmir to be selected for the India women's national cricket team and Amir Hussain Lone who is the captain of Jammu and Kashmir's para cricket team.

Since 2019, the police also have their own T20 cricket tournament.

As of 2020, Abdul Samad became the cricketer from Jammu and Kashmir with the most number of IPL matches. Parvez Rasool comes in second with 11 matches in the IPL.

There is criticism related to excessive politicization and lack of professionalism and support in development of the sport in the region.

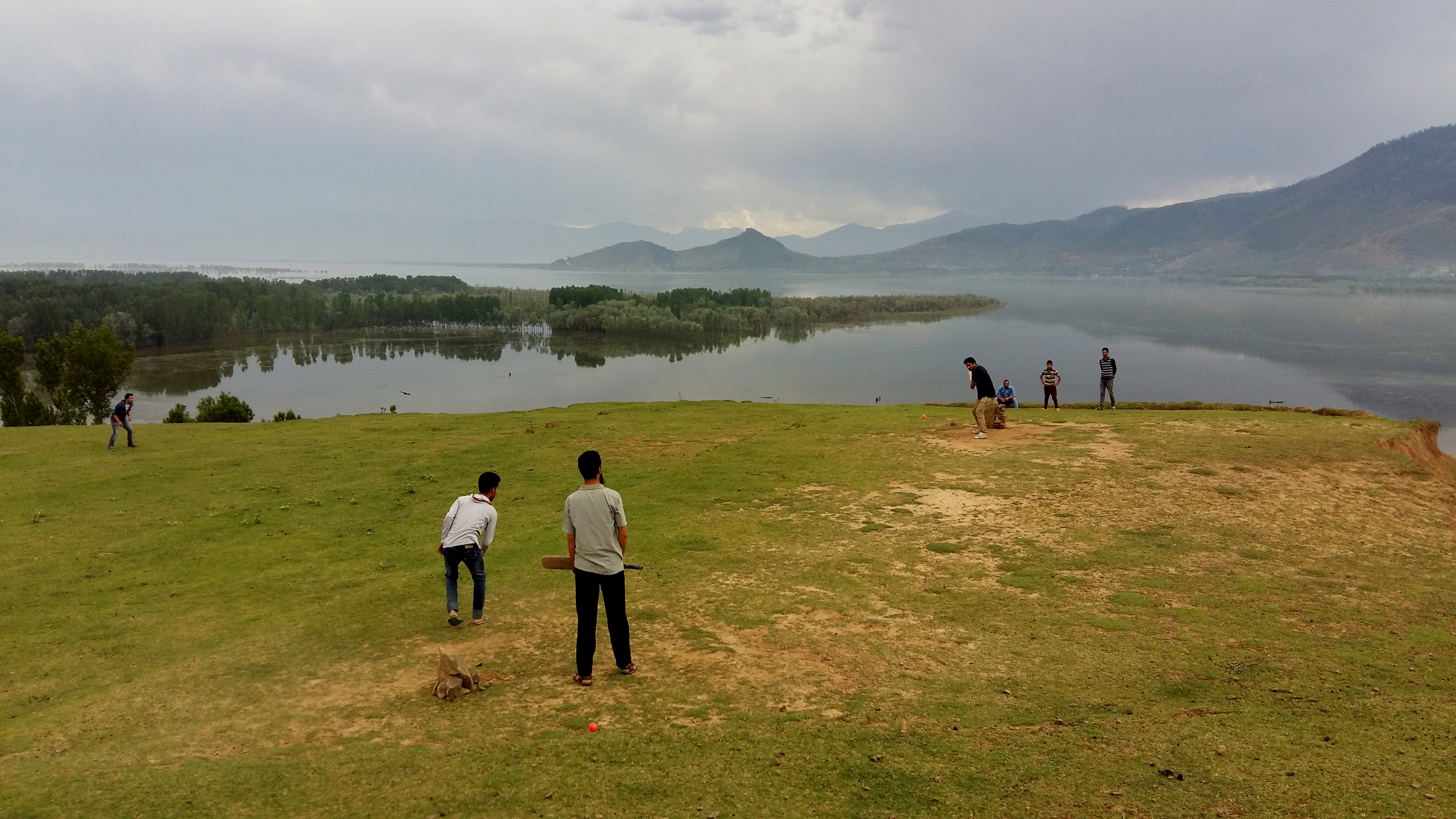
Kashmiri youth playing cricket at Wular Lake, Bandipora district, Jammu and Kashmir.

=== Football in Jammu and Kashmir ===
Football, is also popular sport in Jammu and Kashmir, first came to Jammu and Kashmir in 1891-92 by Tyndale Biscoe. The first time a football team from the region participated in the Santosh Trophy was in 1964. There are around 500 football clubs in the region.

Teams from Jammu and Kashmir which play in the I-League are Real Kashmir (division one) and Lonestar Kashmir (division two). Mehrajuddin Wadoo from Srinagar has represented the India national football team and also plays in the Indian Super League.

Jammu and Kashmir has produced nineteen international players (from the school level to the senior team) such as Abdul Majeed Kakroo. Players from the region have been part of top football teams in India such as Mohun Bagan AC and East Bengal F.C. (such as Ishfaq Ahmed). Basit Ahmed and Mohammed Renbar were chosen to play football with Sociedad Deportiva Lenense Proinastur (SD Lenense), a third division Spanish team, part of a public outreach program of Central Reserve Police Force (CRPF) and J&K Football Association. Other initiatives such as a football team for every village in the Kashmir Valley has also been initiated by the government in 2017.

Night football, with "high-voltage floodlights" set up by the locals themselves, is well contested and attended despite various difficulties.

=== Basketball in Jammu and Kashmir ===
Basketball is a sport which does not attract much attention in India but the condition is even worse in Jammu and Kashmir where political turmoil often undermines the potential of the players. Basketball was on the verge of a decline in 2015, but with the aid of a few administrators, the sport got a new lifeline in Jammu and Kashmir. Having created a strong base the state is trying to capitalise on the foundations to popularise basketball in Jammu and Kashmir.

=== Snow rugby in Jammu and Kashmir ===
Snow rugby was introduced in Srinagar in 2004 and by 2018 around 3000 girls in the region participate in the sport.

=== Marathons in Jammu and Kashmir ===
Marathons that have been conducted in the region include the Ladakh Marathon, the Great Tibetan Marathon and the Kashmir International Half Marathon. The Ladakh Marathon is recognised by Association of International Marathons and Distance Races and is one of the highest marathon in the world.

=== Adventure sports in Jammu and Kashmir ===
Jammu and Kashmir, with its hilly terrain and swift flowing rivers, offers opportunities for water skiing, paragliding and mountaineering.

Tsewang Paljor and Tsewang Samanla from Leh was part India's first team to reach the summit of Mount Everest (from the North Col side). Sonam Wangyal, also from Leh, climbed Mount Everest when he was 23, making him the youngest person to do so at the time.

=== Winter sports in Jammu and Kashmir ===
Jammu and Kashmir has opportunities for heliskiing, ice skating, ice hockey, snow autocross and snowboarding. National level winter sporting events that have taken place in Gulmarg include the alpine ski championship and the snowboarding championship.

==== Icestocksport in Jammu & Kashmir ====
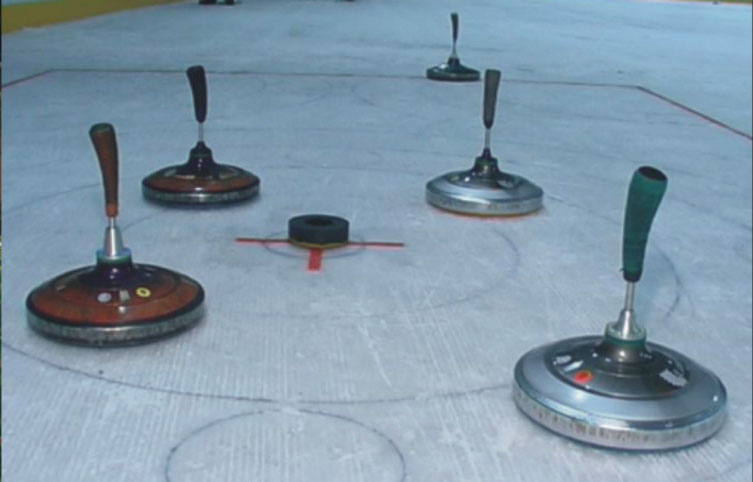
ice stock

Icestocksport, also known as ice stock or Eisstockschießen, is a winter sport, in which participants slide a heavy disc, called a stock, across the ice either towards a target or for distance. Originally popular in Germany and Austria, ice stock has found a growing presence in Jammu & Kashmir due to its ideal winter conditions, particularly in regions like Gulmarg and Pahalgam, which are already known for their winter sports offerings.

One of the prominent figures advocating for winter sports in Jammu & Kashmir, including ice stock, is Aadil Manzoor Peer, a renowned international ice stock top player from Halmatpora Kupwara. Aadil has been instrumental in promoting sports among the youth of the region, not only through his achievements in ice stock but also by encouraging underprivileged athletes to explore and engage in diverse sports disciplines. His efforts have significantly contributed to the rising interest in ice stock and other winter sports in the region.

With the support of local sports authorities and individuals like Aadil Manzoor Peer, Jammu & Kashmir is developing into a hub for winter sports, positioning itself to attract national and international attention as a prime destination for winter tourism and competitive sports events.

==== Khelo India Winter Games ====
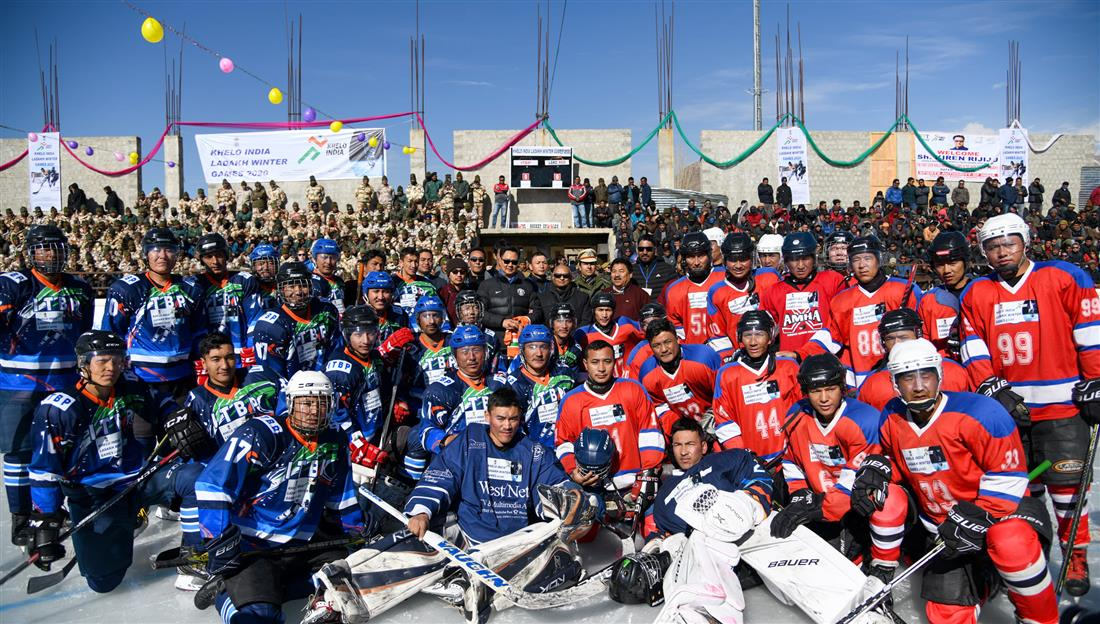
Inauguration of the first Khelo India Winter Games in the presence of the sports minister

The National Winter Games were held in Gulmarg in 1996, 2004, 2008. The second leg of the first Khelo India Winter Games were held between 7 and 11 March 2020 in Gulmarg. Jammu and Kashmir won the most gold medals (26 gold, 29 silver, 21 bronze) while the Indian Army team came second with 8 gold medals. Sports included alpine skiing, Nordic skiing, snow baseball, ice hockey and snowshoeing. 900 athletes from 20 states took part. The second winter games were successfully held in Gulmarg between 26 February–2 March 2020.

==== Snowshoe Run ====
Snowshoe run was held in Srinagar as a part of winter sports to uplift the winter sports in kashmir. This sport is usually played in Europe and was introduced in Kashmir for the first time.

== Infrastructure and institutions ==
Jammu and Kashmir has 19 stadiums, 23 training centers, three indoor sports complexes and 43 government maintained playing fields. This includes Sher-i-Kashmir Stadium, TRC turf ground, Bakshi Stadium, Amar Singh Club Ground, Gandhi Memorial Science College Ground and the Maulana Azad Stadium.

Srinagar District also has two golf courses - Kashmir Golf Club and Royal Spring Golf Course.

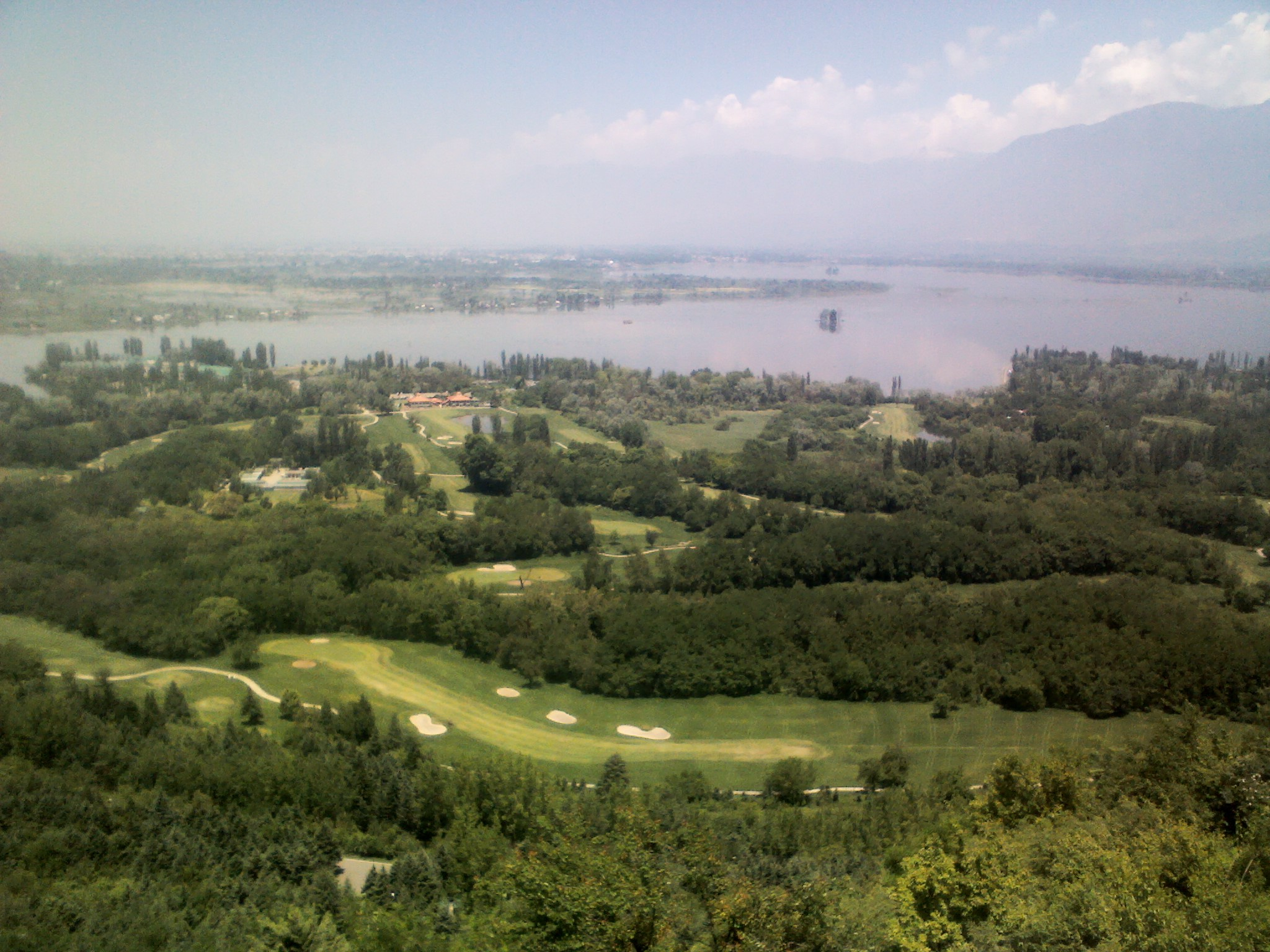
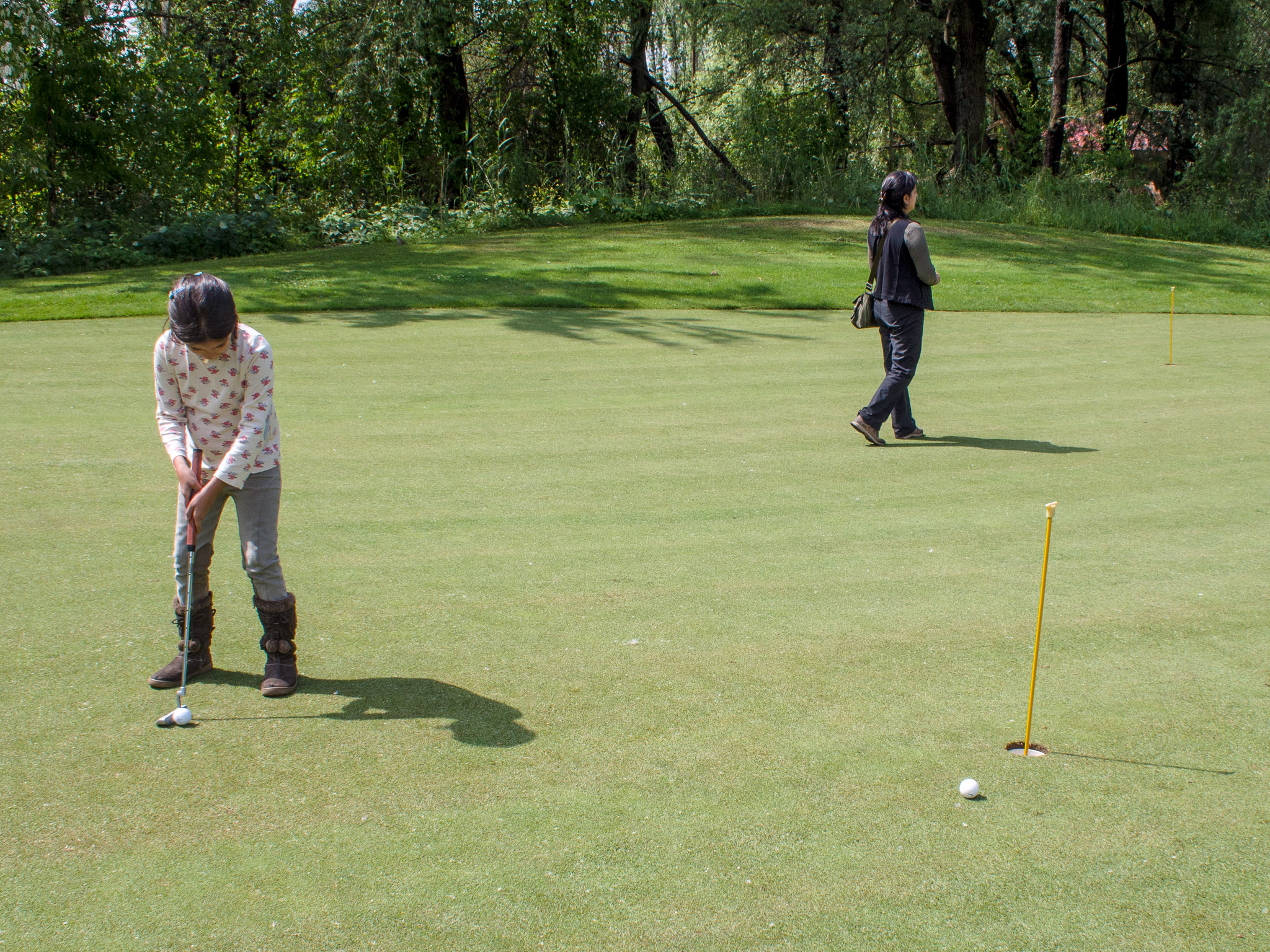
Royal Springs Golf Course, Srinagar

Institutions such as the Jawahar Institute of Mountaineering and Winter Sports provides mountaineering, skiing and adventure courses.

=== Synthetic Turf Football Stadium, TRC Polo Ground ===
The TRC ground is Jammu and Kashmir's first football stadium. It has imported synthetic football turf. The synthetic turf for the stadium has been imported from Italy. The stadium has a capacity for 15000 spectators. The field is of international standard size.

=== Sher-i-Kashmir Stadium ===
Sher-i-Kashmir Stadium is a cricket stadium located in Srinagar. It is home to the JKCA and Jammu and Kashmir cricket team which represents the Indian union territory of Jammu and Kashmir in the Ranji Trophy and other domestic tournaments in the country. National Cricket Academy is currently constructing an indoor complex at the stadium.

=== Under construction ===
A new sports facility is under construction in south Kashmir’s Bijbhera. It is expected to be complete by 2021. Facilities include an "indoor stadium, a cricket ground of international standards, a football ground, hockey stadium, skating rink, cycle track, modular synthetic basketball court, volleyball and badminton courts." On 12 September 2020, the e-foundation stone of the 'Shri Arun Jaitley Memorial Sports Complex' was laid. On 19 September 2020, Suresh Raina, after meeting with the Lieutenant Governor, decided to set up cricket training academies in both Kashmir division and Jammu division.

== Jammu & Kashmir State Sports Council ==
Set up in 1959, the Jammu & Kashmir State Sports Council objectives include promoting sports activities in the state, creating and developing sports infrastructure, providing financial assistance and grants. The Organisation is headed by the Chief Minister of Jammu and Kashmir and the Sports Minister as its president. The council functions at state, divisional and district level.

=== Awards ===
The government of Jammu and Kashmir has introduced various awards to inspire not only the sports people, but also coaches and sports associations. Following are some of these awards:

- Sher-I-Kashmir Award and Medal
- Maharaja Ranjit Singh Award and Medal
- Parshuram Awards and Medals
- Brig Rajinder Singh Award and Medal for Men
- Madri-I-Meharban Award and Medal
- Chief Minister's Gold Rolling Trophy

=== Sports Associations ===
There are over 40 official registered sports associations in the region such the J&K Cricket Association and the J&K Football Association. Other associations under the sports council include the J&K Yoga Association, J&K Cycling Association and the J&K Billiard and Snooker Association. Associations have also been set up for the deaf as well for veterans.

== Sports journalism in Jammu and Kashmir ==
Kashmir has its own dedicated monthly sports magazine "Kashmir Sports Watch". The first issue came out in April 2015 and has a subscription of nearly 12,000 copies per month.

== Salary controversy ==
Under the Rehab-e-Khel scheme, national and international level sports medalists hired as full-time instructors in government schools of Jammu and Kashmir earn only ₹3,000 a month as reported by Hindustan Times.

== See also ==
- Sports in India
- Jammu and Kashmir Cricket Team
- Jammu and Kashmir women's cricket team
- Jammu and Kashmir football team
- Jammu and Kashmir volleyball team
