= Icestock sport in India =

Icestock in India
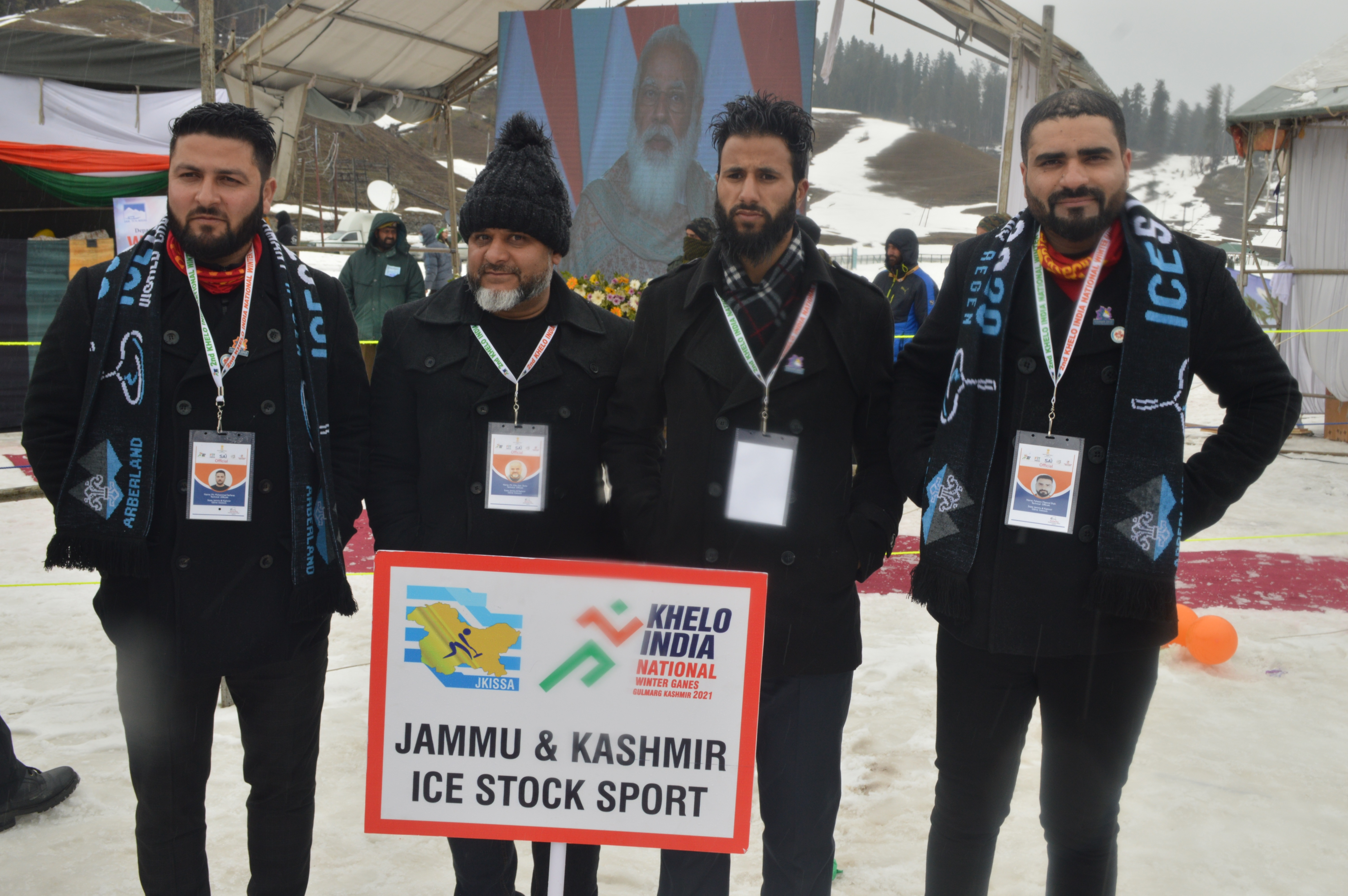
- Indian icestock team in 2021
- Country: India
- Governing body: Indian Icestocksport Federation
- National team: [[India national Icestock team|India]]

Icestock is a sport that has become popular in Jammu and Kashmir and Ladakh in India that have a cold climate and is being taken up in the rest of the country as well.

Gulmarg is the hub of icestock in India and hosts two national competitions of icestock each year: the National Icestock Championship and an event in the Khelo India Winter Games.

Aadil Manzoor Peer is the captain of the Indian national icestock team. He has represented the country in several international competitions.

Faheem Masood Shah is an icestock player from Jammu and Kashmir who has competed in nearly 200 international matches and won medals on three continents. In addition to competitive achievements, he has been active in developing snow sport ecosystems in India through youth outreach and sport science initiatives. He has also been featured in reportage highlighting the growth of winter sports in the region.

Mohammad Sarfaraz, popularly known as Sarfi, is an Indian international icestock athlete from Kashmir who has represented India at multiple international events.

Zerhan Ashaiq won three gold medals in addition to Silver and a bronze medal at the 2024 National Icestock Championship.

Zafeera Zahoor is another young player who has been successful at the national level.

The western state of Gujarat has been successful in icestock, despite having a warm climate. Two players from Gujarat took part in the 14th Icestock World Championship in Italy in 2022. A speech and hearing-impaired tribal woman from Gujarat won a bronze medal at the 9th Ice Stock National Championship in 2023.

== Gallery ==
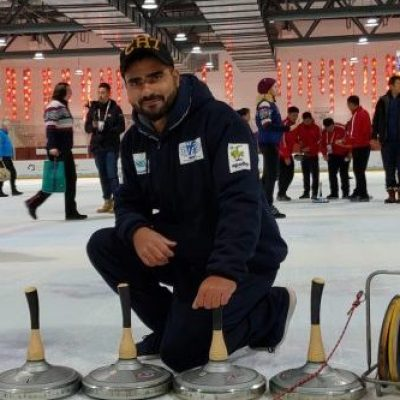
Indian icestock player Faheem Masood Shah

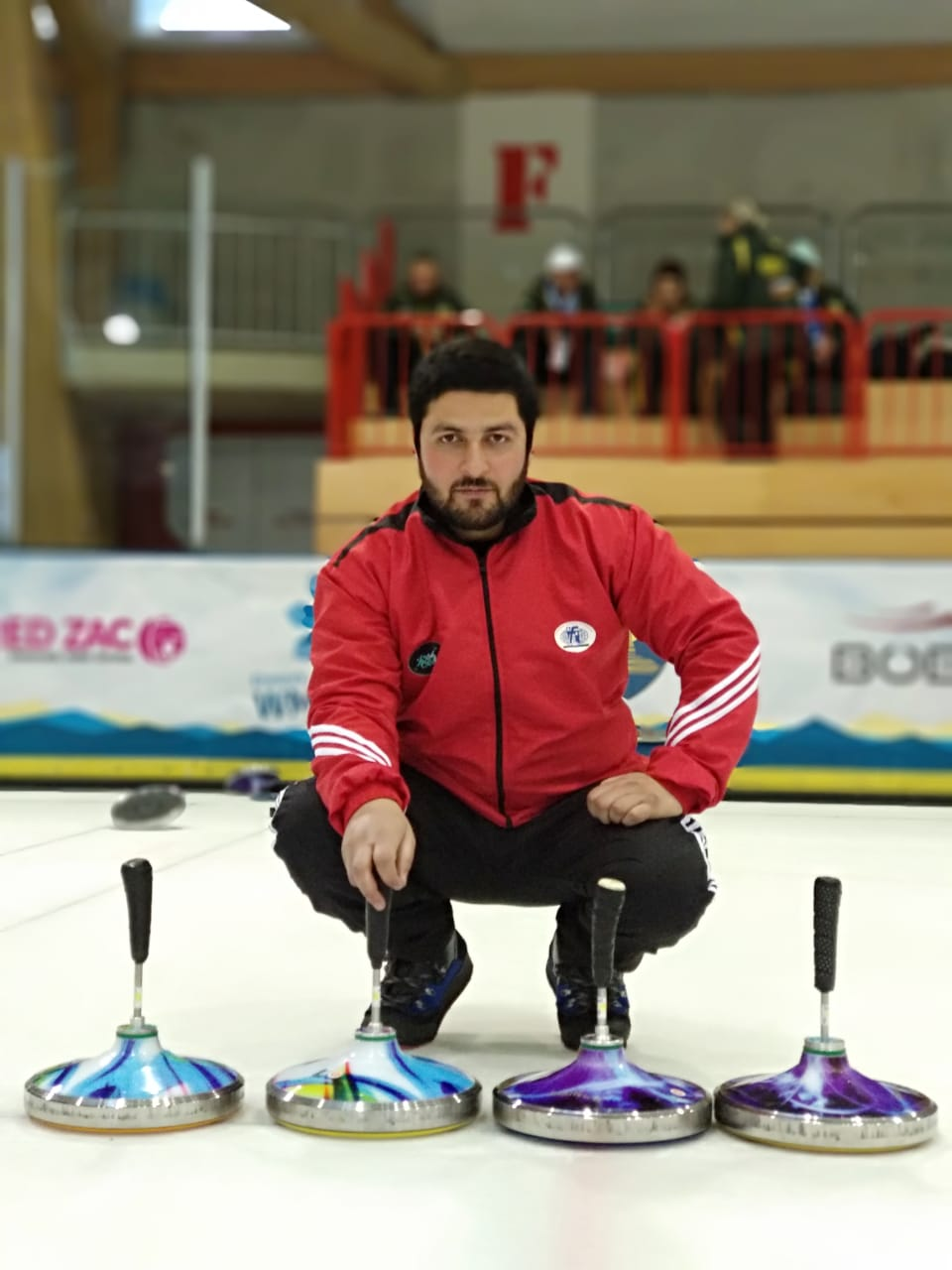
Indian icestock player Mohammad Sarfaraz

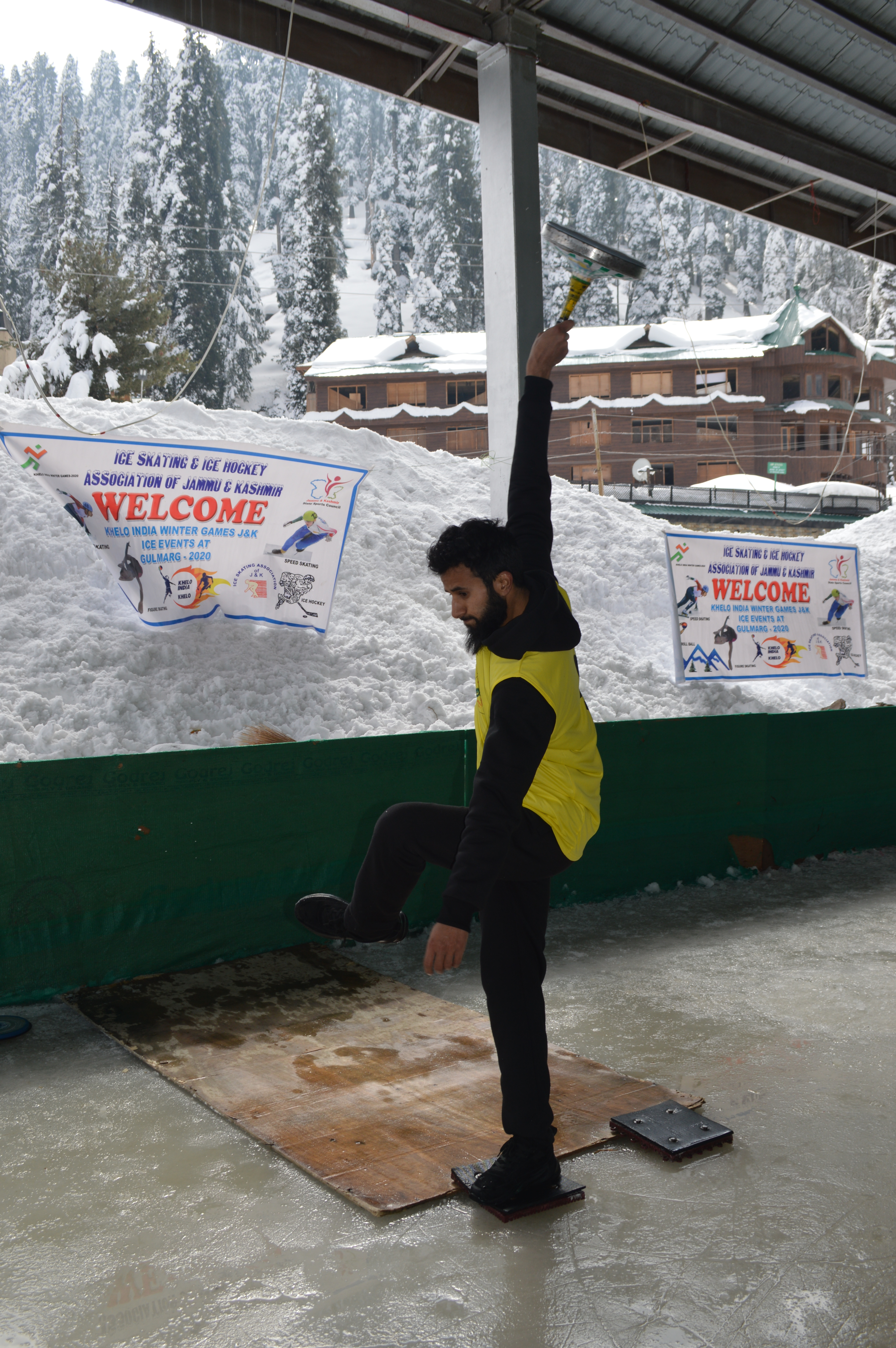
Indian icestock player Aadil Manzoor Peer
