= Ice stock sport at the Winter Olympics =

- IOC Code: IST
- Governing body: IFI
- Events: 4 (men)

Winter Olympics
- 1924; 1928; 1932; 1936; 1948; 1952; 1956; 1960; 1964; 1968; 1972; 1976; 1980; 1984; 1988; 1992; 1994; 1998; 2002; 2006; 2010; 2014; 2018; 2022; 2026; Note: demonstration or exhibition sport years indicated in italics
- Medalists

Ice stock sport, also known as Bavarian Curling, was featured in the Winter Olympic Games demonstration programme in 1936 and 1964.

== See also ==
- Curling at the Winter Olympics, a similar sport
