= Icebocce =

Team sport played on a frozen surface

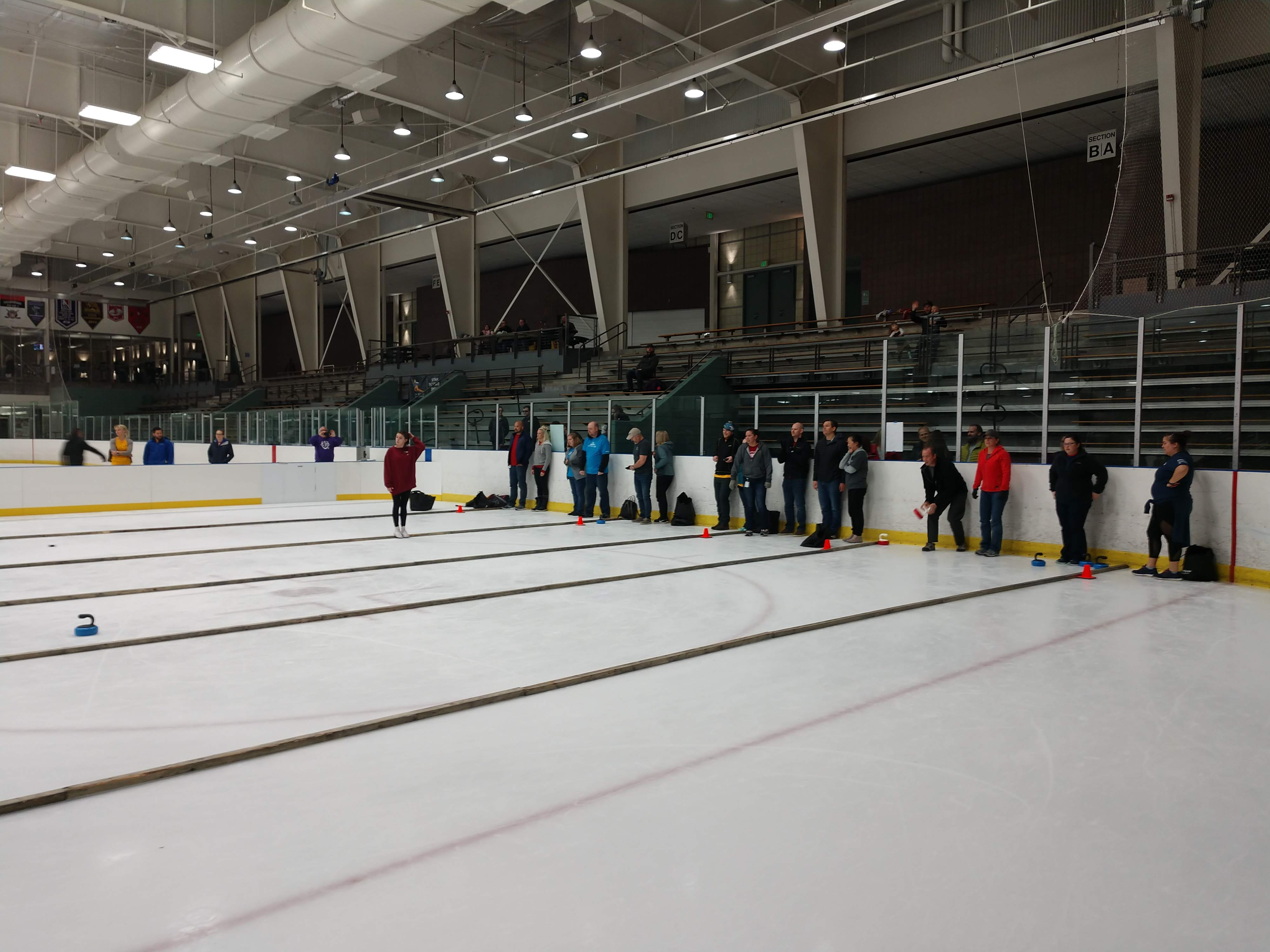
- Salt Lake City Corporate Winter Olympic Games 2019
- Highest governing body: World Icebocce Association (WIA)
- Nicknames: Ice Bocce
- First played: North America in early 2000s

Characteristics
- Contact: Non-Contact
- Team members: Two Teams 1-4 Player Teams
- Mixed-sex: Yes, Separate or Mixed
- Type: Individual Sport, Team Sport, Winter Sport, All Ages
- Equipment: Dysks (curls), Target Jack (puck)

Presence
- Country or region: North America
- Olympic: No
- Paralympic: No
- World Games: No

Icebocce (also rendered as Ice Bocce) is a recreational winter sport that combines elements of bocce, curling and bowling. Played on a frozen surface, participants slide weighted discs toward a small target marker, with scoring determined by proximity to the target. The sport shares structural similarities with Ice Stock Sport, a Bavarian tradition with roots in medieval Europe. Icebocce is most commonly played in northern regions of the United States, particularly Minnesota, where it has developed a notable presence in community winter festivals and organized tournaments.

== History ==
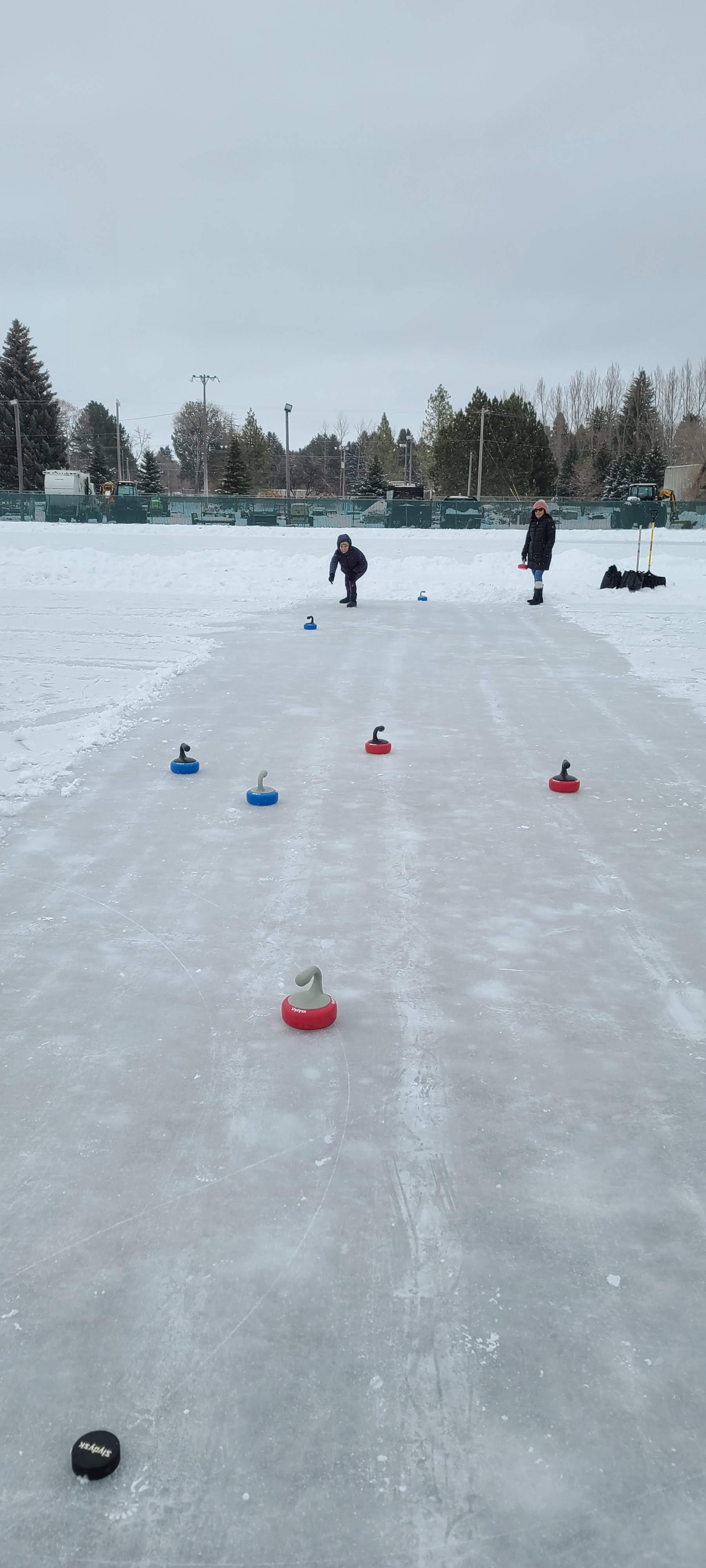
Playing at the Local Outdoor Ice Rink.

Icebocce belongs to a broader tradition of rolling-stone sports that includes boules games like bowling, bocce, pétanque to sliding-sports like curling and shuffleboard. Icebocce is closes to a sport called Ice Stock Sport (Eisstockschießen or simply Stockschießen). Ice Stock Sport, which originated in Bavaria and is played across Germany, Austria and Poland, served as a demonstration sport at the Winter Olympics in 1936 and 1964, and represents the closest historical antecedent to icebocce in terms of mechanics and playing environment.

The modern form of icebocce is believed to have originated on the frozen lakes of Minnesota during the late 20th century. In its earliest iterations, players improvised equipment from locally available materials, including wooden blocks fitted with handles and repurposed containers filled with ice or other weighted material. These objects were slid across frozen surfaces toward a target in a manner consistent with bocce scoring conventions.

The sport developed without formal codification, evolving through local practice and community participation. This grassroots character contributed to regional variation in equipment, court setup and rules. Over time, purpose-built equipment was developed to improve consistency and performance.

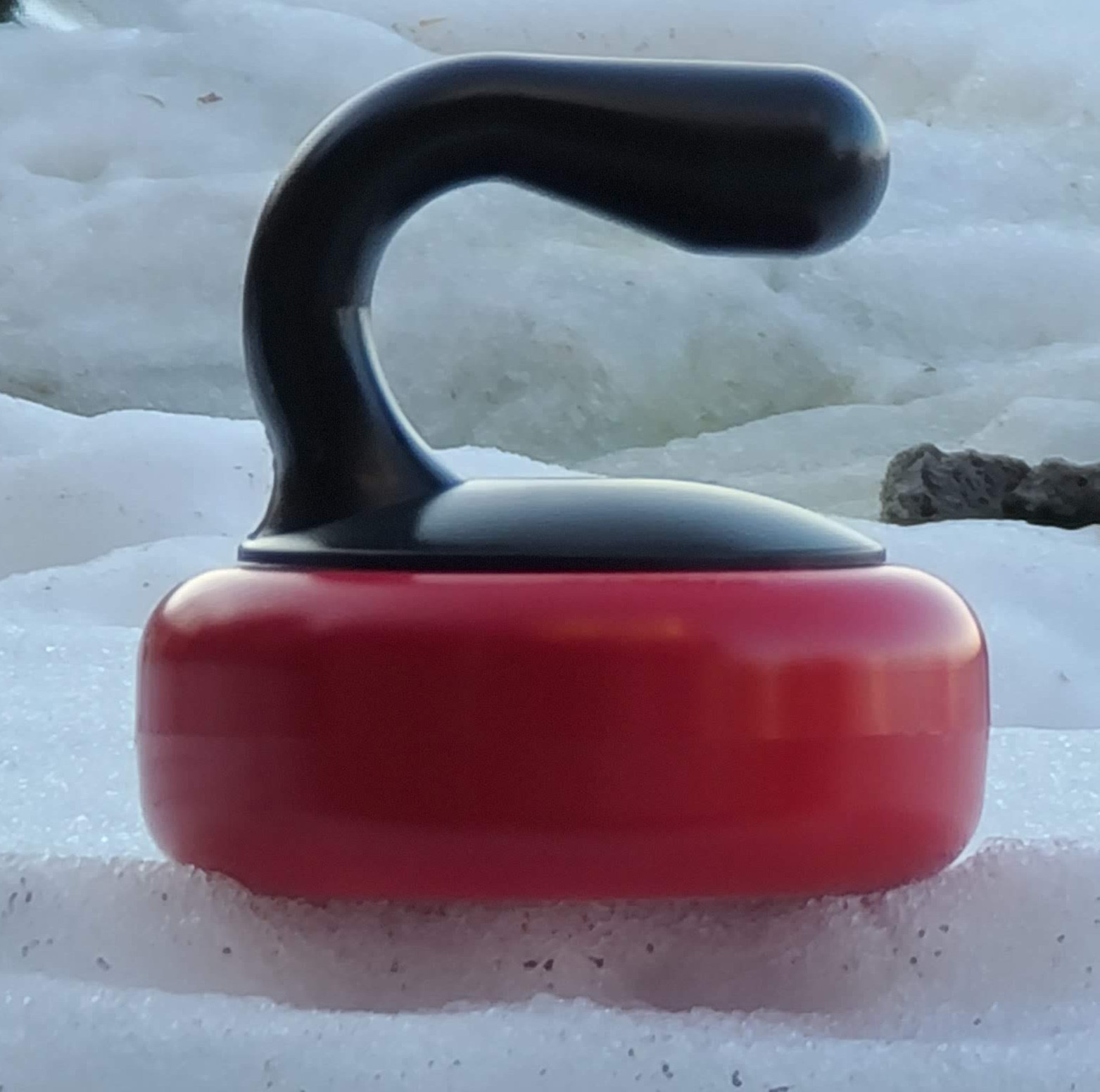
Modern Icebocce Dysk

== Equipment ==
Early icebocce equipment was improvised from household and workshop materials. Contemporary play typically uses purpose-built discs, sometimes referred to as dysks, designed to slide predictably across ice surfaces. The target marker is variously referred to as the pick, jack, or puck, consistent with terminology used in related sports.

== Playing surface ==
Icebocce may be played on any frozen surface capable of supporting the weight of players, including frozen lakes, ponds, outdoor skating rinks, backyard rinks and indoor ice arenas. Court boundaries may be established using snow banks, boards, or other markers, though informal play without defined boundaries is also common.

== Rules and gameplay ==
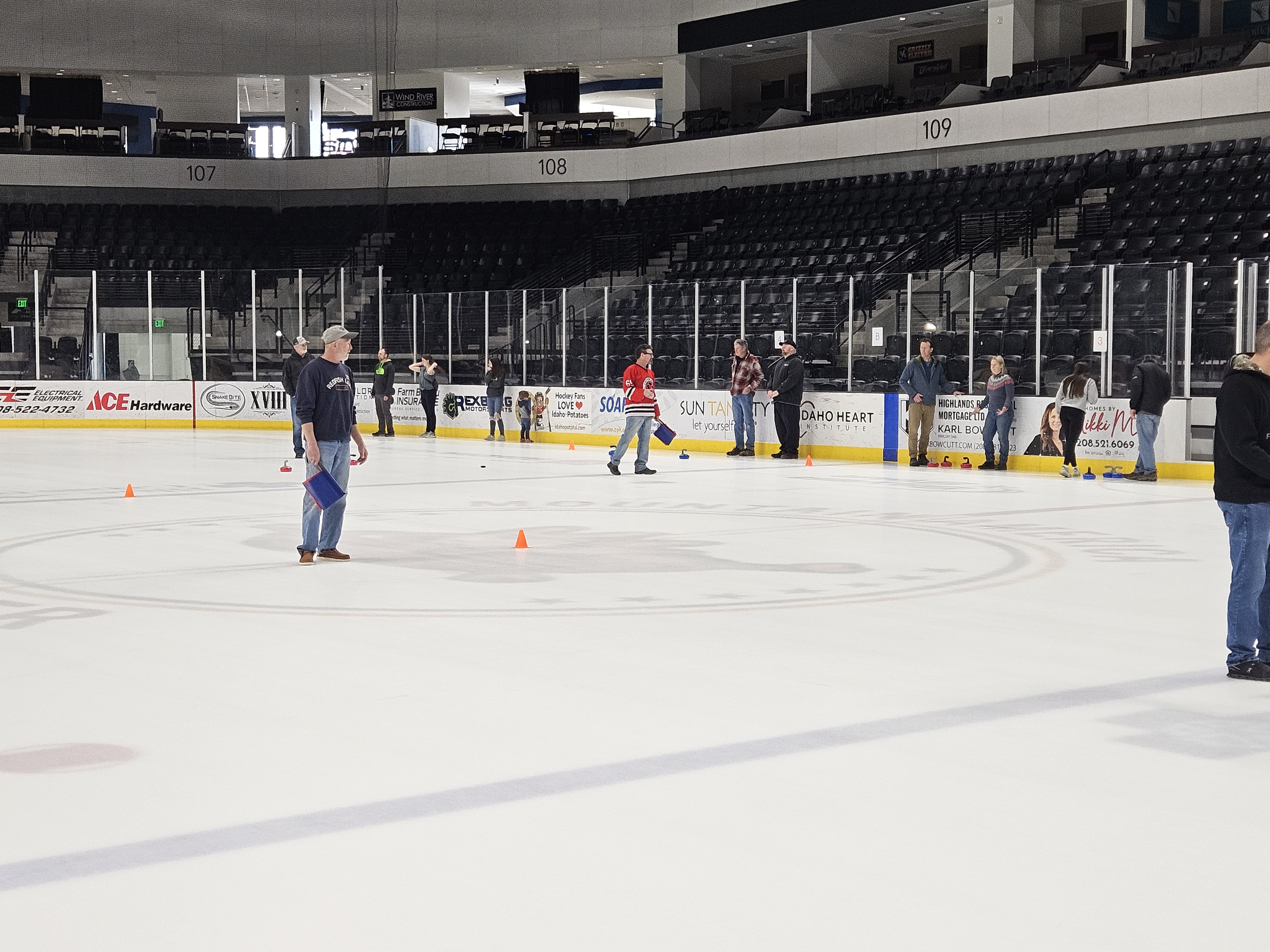
Mountain America Center 2026

Icebocce is contested between two teams. The objective is to slide one's discs closer to the target marker than those of the opposing team.

A round begins with one team throwing the target marker across the ice, followed by that team's first player sliding a disc toward it. The opposing team then attempts to place a disc nearer to the target. If unsuccessful, that team continues throwing until it achieves a closer position or exhausts its discs. Teams alternate in this manner until all eight discs have been played, at which point the round is scored.

One point is awarded for each disc belonging to the leading team that lies closer to the target than any disc of the opposing team. A game concludes when one team has accumulated 12 points at the end of a completed round.

== Organized play ==
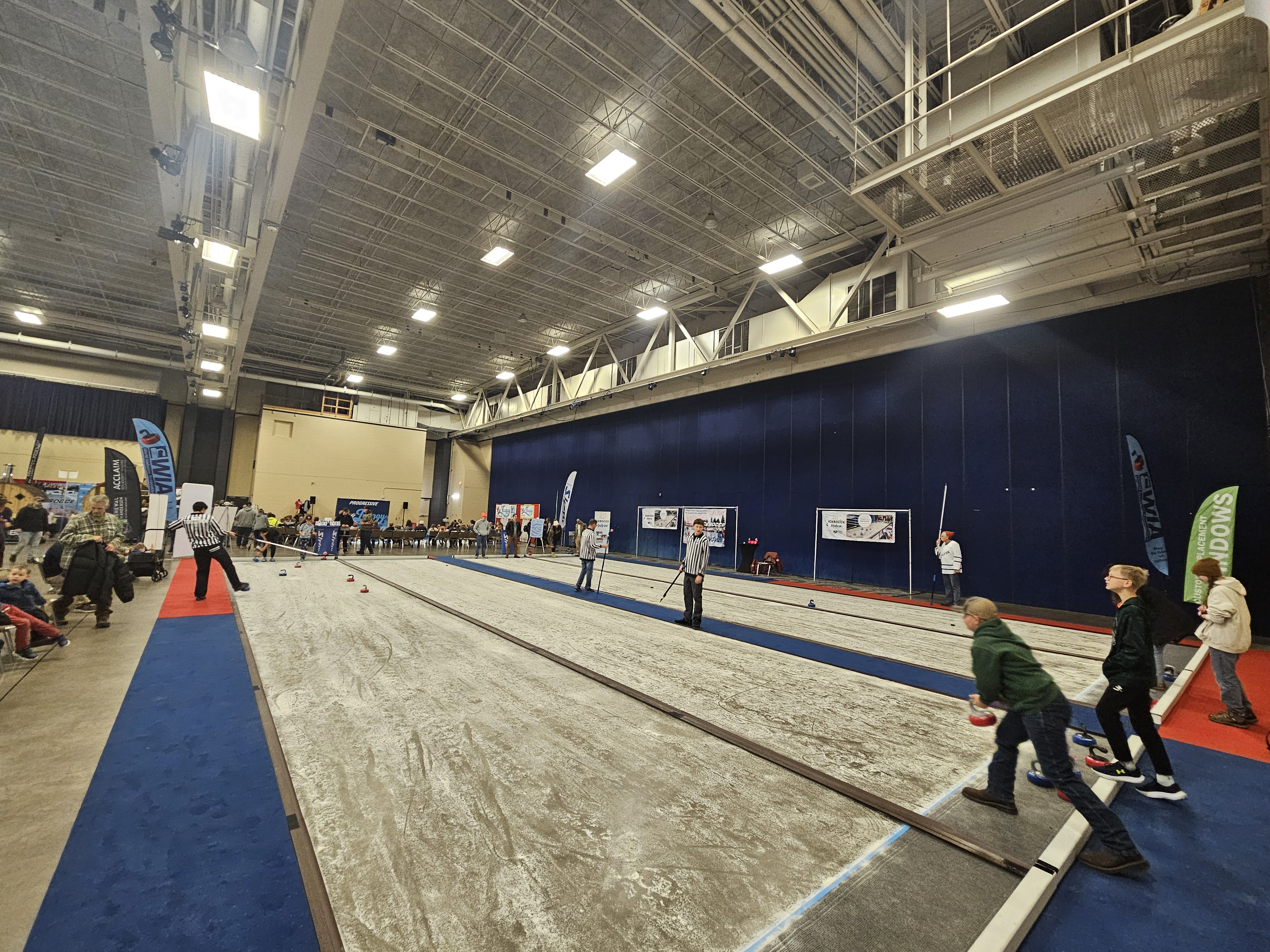
Arrowhead Ice Fishing and Winter Show 2025

Icebocce has been incorporated into a number of community winter events, particularly in Minnesota, Civic organizations including Chambers of Commerce in Longville Moose Lake, Linwood Lake, Brainerd Lakes and Pequot Lakes have hosted organized tournaments. Community clubs, including the Lions Club in Kimball, Minnesota, have also facilitated competitive play.

Beyond Minnesota, the sport has appeared at regional and multi-sport events, including the Salt Lake Corporate Winter Olympic Games (2018–19) and the Duluth Arrowhead Ice Fishing and Winter Show in December 2025.

== See also ==
- Bocce
- Curling
- Bowling
- Ice stock sport
- Pétanque
- Boules
- Shuffleboard
