= Aadil Manzoor Peer =

Indian ice stock sport athlete (born 1997)

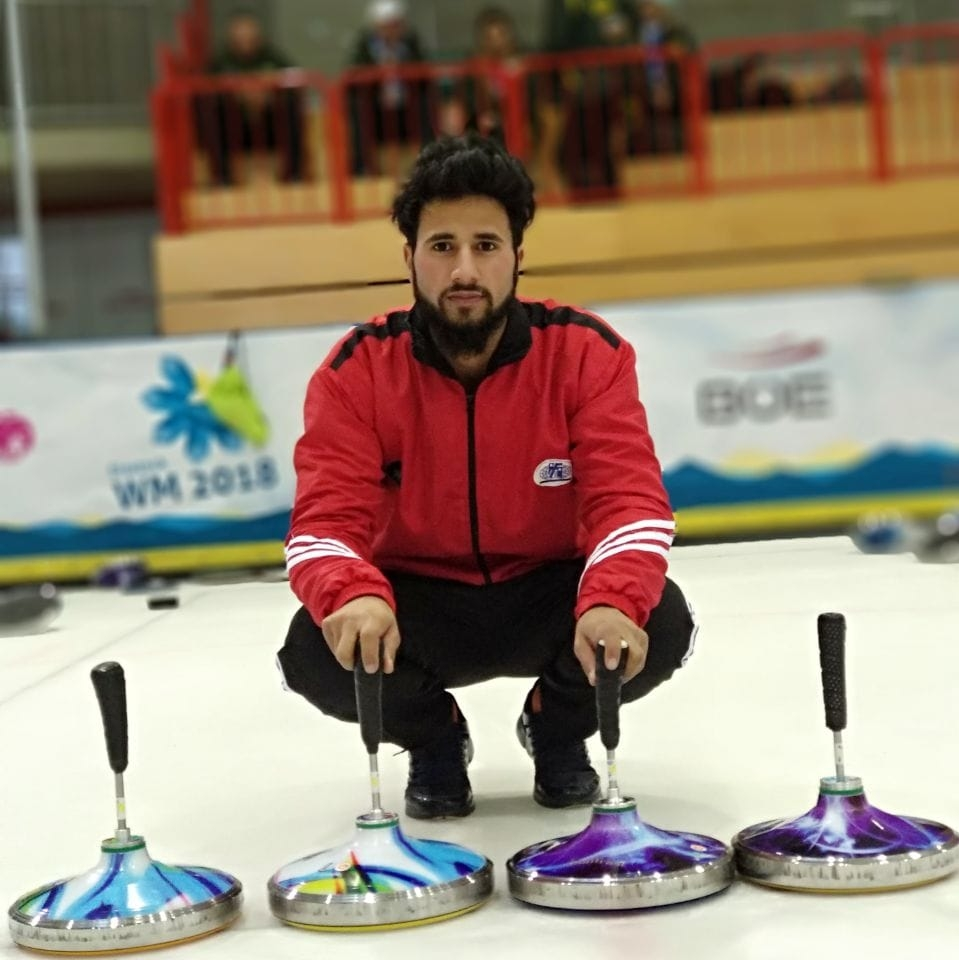
- Born: 2 March 1997 (age 29); Halmatpora village, Kupwara, Jammu and Kashmir, India
- Other name: Syed Aadi
- Organization: International Federation Icestocksport (IFI)
- Style: Right Hand
- Parent(s): Manzoor Ahmad and Fahmeeda Begum

Aadil Manzoor Peer (born 2 March 1997), popularly known as Syed Aadi, is an Indian international ice stock sport athlete. Known for his right-hand playing style, Aadi has represented India in various international competitions.

In 2018, he competed in Austria, where he achieved a 10th-place ranking while representing India.

In the second edition of the Khelo India National Winter Games, he won three gold medals representing Jammu and Kashmir in ice stock events.

Aadil Manzoor Peer secured 4 Gold Medals for Jammu and Kashmir in different 4 events, 1 in Long Distance and 3 with Team in Team Game, Team Target and Team Distance events respectively, in Summer National Ice stock sport Championship.

Aadil Manzoor has been captain of the Jammu and Kashmir ice stock sport state team since 2018, and has been appointed as the Captain of Indian National ice stock Team.

Peer has won multiple medals at the Khelo India Winter Games, including five golds, two silvers, and one bronze across different editions. In 2025, Peer captained the Indian team at the 15th World Ice Stock Sport Championship in Austria, where India secured a historic bronze medal. His decisive final throw contributed to one of India’s strongest performances in international ice stock competition.

== Career ==
Aadil Manzoor embarked on his sports journey, initially delving into the realms of Rugby and Pencak Silat. However, in 2012, he made a notable transition to Ice stock sport, a novel pursuit for him at the time. Since then, Aadil has consistently reached milestones both on the national and international stages.

Hailing from the picturesque Halmatpora village in the north of Kashmir's Kupwara district, Aadil Manzoor received specialized training in Ice stock skills from Coach Irfan Aziz Botta.

In terms of his career trajectory, Aadil initially aspired to become a professional rugby player, commencing his rugby journey in 2007 at the age of 12, representing Jammu and Kashmir. The introduction to ice stock sport came through the guidance of Coach Botta and Mohammad Iqbal.

Remaining steadfast in his commitment to the game, Aadil assumed the role of captain for Team India in the 'Team Distance Event' during the recent International Ice stock championship in Ritten, Italy, held from 21 to 27 February. Team India achieved the 8th rank globally, securing an aggregate score of 230.11 meters in Ice stock throws.

=== Leadership Roles ===
Since 2018, Peer has served as captain of the Jammu and Kashmir ice stock sport state team. He was later appointed Captain of the Indian National Ice Stock Team.

He led Team India in the Team Distance Event at the International Ice Stock Championship in Ritten, Italy, where India secured 8th rank globally with an aggregate throw distance of 230.11 meters.

=== Challenges and Advocacy ===
Peer has spoken about the infrastructural and financial challenges faced by winter sport athletes in India. He has noted that:

- Gulmarg remains India’s primary natural ice training venue, operational for approximately 2–3 months annually.
- Ice stock equipment is imported from Europe and costs between ₹80,000 and ₹1,00,000 per kit.
- Access to indoor ice facilities in India is limited and expensive.

He has advocated for improved infrastructure, sponsorship support, and year-round training facilities to enhance India’s competitiveness in winter sports.

== Tournaments Record ==
All Competition Results
Year	Event	Rank	Location	Place
2013	1st National ice stock sport Championship	National	Jammu and Kashmir (Gulmarg) India	Gold
2015	2nd National ice stock sport Championship	National	Jammu and Kashmir India	Gold
2016	3rd National ice stock sport Championship	National	Jammu and Kashmir India	Gold
2017	4th National ice stock sport Championship	National	Jammu and Kashmir India	Gold
2018	5th National ice stock sport Championship	National	Jammu and Kashmir India	Gold Silver
2018	12th ice stock sport World Cup	World Championship	Austria	10th Rank
2019	6th National ice stock sport Championship	National	Jammu and Kashmir India	Gold Gold Silver
2019	International ice stock sport Cup	International	China	5th Rank
2021	7th National ice stock sport Championship	National	Jammu and Kashmir India	Gold Silver
2021	2nd Khelo India National Winter Games	National	Gulmarg India	Gold Gold Gold
2021	Summer National ice stock sport Championship	National	Jammu and Kashmir India SKISC	Gold Gold Gold Gold
2022	8th National ice stock sport Championship	National	Jammu and Kashmir India	Gold Silver
2022	14th ice stock sport World Championship	World Championship	Ritten Italy	7th Rank
2023	9th National ice stock sport Championship	National	Gulmarg India	Gold Gold Gold Gold Bronze
2023	3rd Khelo India National Winter Games	National	Gulmarg India	Gold Gold Silver Bronze
2023	2nd Summer National ice stock sport Championship	National	Pune Maharashtra India	Gold Gold Silver
2024	10th National ice stock sport Championship	National	Gulmarg India	Gold Gold Gold Silver
2024	3rd Summer National ice stock sport Championship	National	Srinagar India	Silver Silver Silver Silver
2025	15th ice stock sport World Championship	World Championship	Austria	Bronze
2026	4th Summer National ice stock sport Championship	National	Agra, Uttar Prdesh India	Gold Gold Silver
2026	12th National ice stock sport Championship	National	Gulmarg India	Gold Gold Silver Silver

== See also ==
- Ice stock sport
- Sports in Jammu and Kashmir
- Ice stock sport at the Winter Olympics
