= Snow baseball =

Winter sport

Snow baseball is a winter sport based on baseball that is played on snow. Snow baseball can be played on snow or frost, with players typically wearing snowshoes or skis.

The sport is popular in India during the winter season, where it is mainly played in the Kashmir region and in the states of Himachal Pradesh and Uttarakhand.

The sport is an event at the Khelo India Winter Games, where teams such as Jammu and Kashmir and Uttarakhand have won gold medals in men's and women's teams events respectively.

The organizing committee of the sport is the Baseball Association of Jammu and Kashmir under Jammu and Kashmir Sports Council.

== History ==
Due to heavy snow in the Kashmir Valley during the winter, it is impractical to play baseball outdoors. Therefore, as an alternative to playing on a baseball field, the game is played on snow.
