= Ice stock sport at the 1964 Winter Olympics =

Ice stock sport was a demonstration sport at the 1964 Winter Olympics, with events held on February 8 and 9. After attempts to find a natural ice venue failed, competitions were held on training rinks for figure skating.

== Results ==
The top three finishers in each event are shown.

=== Men's target shooting ===
Place	Nation	Athlete
1	Austria	Johann Rottensteiner
2	United Team of Germany	Albin Stockinger
3	Austria	Johann Kainz

=== Men's distance shooting ===
Place	Nation	Athlete
1	Austria	Peter Hörl
2	Austria	Erich Hörl
3	United Team of Germany	Max Geiß

=== Men's distance shooting (senior) ===
Place	Nation	Athlete
1	United Team of Germany	Ludwig Wagner
2	Austria	Leo Meisl
3	Austria	Raimund Reichenpfader

=== Men's team ===
Place	Nation	Team
1	United Team of Germany	EC Frauenau 1953
2	Austria	ER Völkendorf
3	United Team of Germany	EV Füssen
