= Iqra Rasool =

Indian cricketer (born 2000)

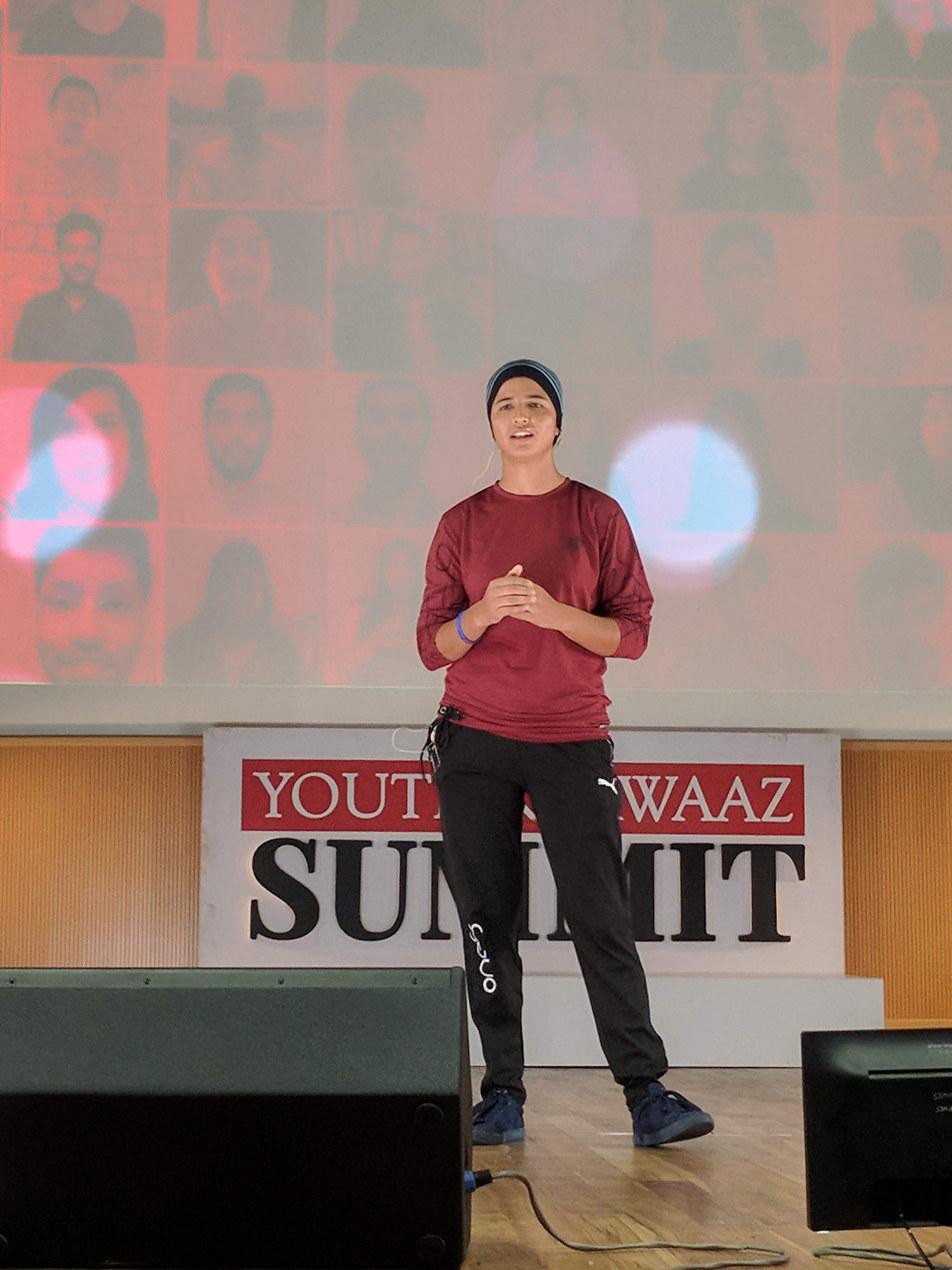
- Iqra Rasool speaking at a Youth Summit in New Delhi

Personal information
- Full name: Iqra Rasool Lone
- Born: 15 August 2000 (age 26); Baramulla, Jammu and Kashmir, India
- Height: 5 ft 8 in (1.73 m)
- Batting: Right-handed
- Bowling: Right-arm medium
- Role: Bowler

Domestic team information
- Years: Team
- 2022/23–2023/24: Jammu and Kashmir

Career statistics
Competition	List A	Twenty20
Matches	1	4
Runs scored	0	–
Batting average	–	–
100s/50s	0/0	–
Top score	0*	–
Balls bowled	12	18
Wickets	0	0
Bowling average	–	–
5 wickets in innings	–	–
10 wickets in match	–	–
Best bowling	–	–
Catches/stumpings	0/–	0/–
- Source: CricketArchive, 11 May 2025

Iqra Rasool (born 15 August 2000) is an Indian cricketer and also known as 'Baramulla's supergirl'. She hails from Dangiwacha, Rafiabad located in North Kashmir and represented Jammu and Kashmir at the U-19 and U-23 level.

In 2017, at a session of ‘We The Women’ in Mumbai, Mithali Raj, the captain of the Indian Women's cricket team, presented a ‘H.E.R.’ (Hope. Empower. Rise.) award to Iqra Rasool. H.E.R awards are conferred to those who have "shown remarkable excellence in their areas and have often taken risks, battled odds or rewritten the rules in pursuit of success".

== Early life ==
Her father, Ghulam Rasool Lone, is a bakery owner and she is the youngest of six siblings.

She has played four times for her state at the national level at Amritsar, Haryana, Goa, Himachal and Jammu, prior to which she was with her girls’ team in school. In 2013, she was selected by the Jammu & Kashmir Cricket Association (JKCA) citing her brilliant performance in the inter-district tournaments. She has represented Jammu & Kashmir at the U-19 and U-23 level. Rasool says she is a fan of Virat Kohli and the Pakistani pacer Mohammad Aamir.

== Cricket career ==
Rasool has represented her state four times at the national level at Amritsar, Haryana, Goa, Himachal and Jammu. In 2015, she played a tournament in Telangana and took three wickets in the finals while playing in the under-17 team.

In May 2017, she moved to West Bengal and joined Aditya School of Sports to play for Bengal. Further, she wants to play for India women's national cricket team after getting a No Objection Certificate (NOC) from Jammu Kashmir Cricket Association. Coached by Abdul Monayem, she currently represents Bengal at the domestic level. As of August 2017, Iqra is training at the indoor facilities of the Eden Gardens under Cricket Association of Bengal (CAB).

As a tie-up deal between Michael Clarke Cricket Academy and newly opened Aditya School of Sports, cricketer Michael Clarke announced that there will be young talented cricketers travelling to Sydney on a 12-day programme. This team also includes Iqra Rasool.

== See also ==
- Sports in India
- Sports in Jammu and Kashmir
- Jammu and Kashmir women's cricket team
