= Beti Bachao Beti Padhao =

Government of India initiative

- Founder: Government of India
- Country: India
- Prime Minister(s): Narendra Modi
- Ministry: A joint initiative of MoWCD, MoHFW and MoE
- Launched: 22 January 2015 (11 years ago)
- Status: Active

Beti Bachao Beti Padhao (BBBP) (transl. 'Save the Daughter, Educate the Daughter') is a flagship social campaign of the Government of India launched on 22 January 2015 by Prime Minister Narendra Modi in Panipat, Haryana. The scheme aims to address the declining child sex ratio (CSR) and promote the education and empowerment of girls across the country. It is a tri-ministerial initiative jointly run by the Ministry of Women and Child Development, the Ministry of Health and Family Welfare, and the Ministry of Education (formerly the Ministry of Human Resource Development).

The campaign seeks to combat deep-rooted gender bias and discrimination against girls by raising awareness, encouraging community participation, and improving the delivery of welfare services meant for women and girls. It also emphasizes the importance of girl child's survival, safety, and access to quality education. Initially launched in 100 gender-critical districts, the programme has since expanded to cover all districts in India.

== Background ==
The child sex ratio in India had been going down at an alarming rate. In the population census of 2011, the child sex ratio in India was 919 females of girls aged 1 to 6 years old. During the 2014 International Day of the Girl Child, Prime Minister Narendra Modi asked the public to help end sexism against girls in India.

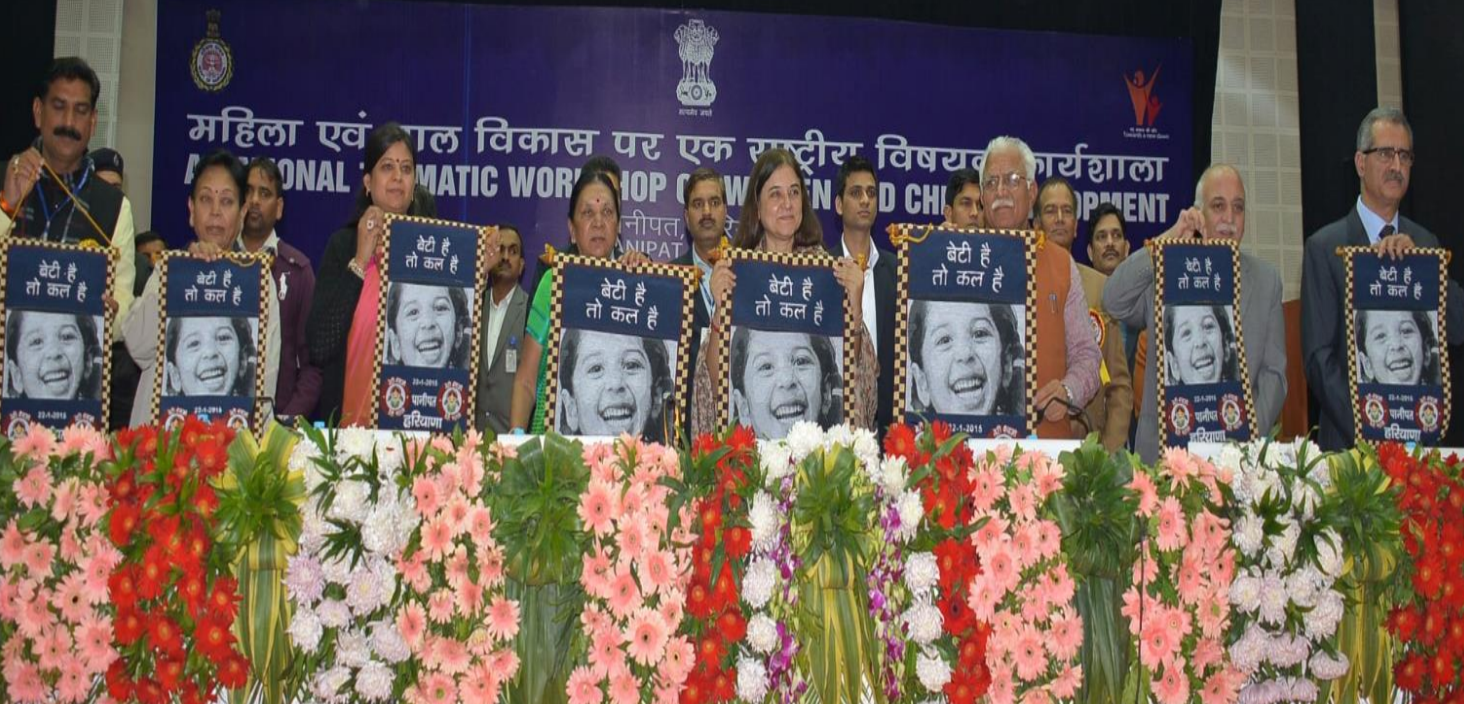
The launch meeting in 2015

The Beti Bachao, Beti Padhao (BBBP) scheme was launched on 22 January 2015 by Prime Minister Narendra Modi. It aims to address the issue of the declining child sex ratio image (CSR) and is a national initiative jointly run by the Ministry of Women and Child Development, the Ministry of Health and Family Welfare and the Ministry of Education. It initially focused on multi-sector action in 100 districts throughout the country where there was a low CSR.

On 26 August 2016, Olympics 2016 bronze medallist wrestler Sakshi Malik was made the brand ambassador for BBBP.

The hashtag #SelfieWithDaughter was promoted on social media in June 2015, which started when Sunil Jaglan the Sarpanch of the village Bibipur, Jind in Haryana took a selfie with his daughter Nandini and posted on Facebook on 9 June 2015. The hashtag garnered worldwide fame.

== Campaign ambassadors ==
A list of current and former ambassadors:

- Tanishka and Riddhika Kotia, international chess players, ambassadors for the Gurgaon district.
- Vandana Katariya, Indian hockey player, ambassador for the Haridwar district.
- Tajamul Islam, two-time Kickboxing junior World Champion.
- Sakshi Malik, olympic medallist, freestyle wrestler.
- Avani Lakhara, paralympic champion, rifle shooter.

== Reasons for this initiative ==
Sex-selective abortion or female foeticide has led to a sharp drop in the ratio of girls born in contrast to boy infants in some states in India. Ultrasound technology has made it possible for pregnant women and their families to learn the sex of a foetus early in a pregnancy. Discrimination against girl infants, for several reasons, has combined with the technology to result in a rise in abortions of foetuses identified as female during ultrasonic testing.

The trend was first noticed when results of the 1991 national census were released and were confirmed to be a worsening problem when results of the 2001 national census were released. The reduction in the female population of certain Indian states continues to worsen, as results of the 2011 national census have shown. It has been observed that the trend is most pronounced in relatively prosperous regions of India. The dowry system in India is often blamed; the expectation that a large dowry must be provided for daughters for them to marry is frequently cited as a major cause for the problem. Pressure for parents to provide large dowries for their daughters is most intense in prosperous states where high standards of living, and modern consumerism, are more prevalent in Indian society.

Rates of female foeticide in Madhya Pradesh are increasing; the rate of live births was 932 girls per 1000 boys in 2001, which dropped to 918 by 2011. It is expected that if this trend continues, by 2021 the number of girls will drop below 900 per 1000 boys.

== Support ==
The Government of India constituted a National Executive Committee in 2015 to guide the implementation of the Beti Bachao Beti Padhao (BBBP) scheme across the country. The committee spearheads several national-level campaigns and programmes under the dual themes of "Save the Girl Child" and "Educate the Girl Child." Dr. Rajendra Phadke serves as the National Convener of the BBBP Abhiyan, coordinating strategic oversight, inter-state collaboration, and stakeholder engagement for the initiative.

The Beti Bachao campaign is also supported by the Indian Medical Association.

== In popular culture ==
In August 2023, a film titled Panch Kriti (transl. Five Elements), based on the Swachh Bharat Mission, was released in India. It featured five stories set in Chanderi in Bundelkhand, Madhya Pradesh, was largely shot on real locations. The film is women-centric and addresses several themes pertaining to women. It also explores the importance of social movements in India, such as the Swachh Bharat Abhiyan and the Beti Bachao Beti Padhao Abhiyan.

== Effectiveness ==
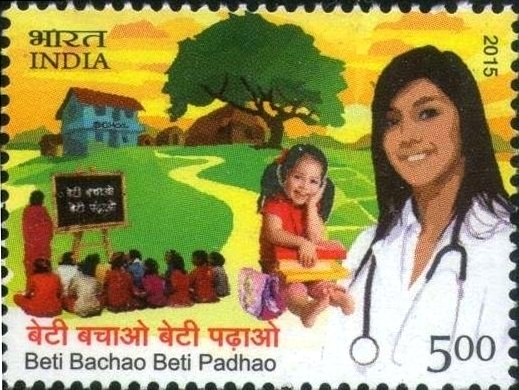
Stamp of India 2015 Beti Bachao Beti Padhao

The Comptroller and Auditor General of India (CAG) reported that the scheme failed to meet its objectives. As per the CAG data, the sex ratio has deteriorated in many districts of Haryana and Punjab. According to the report of the Parliamentary Standing Committee on Human Resource Development, only ₹5 crore (US$530,000) of a total of ₹43 crore (US$4.6 million) allotted for the scheme in the financial year 2016-2017 was properly used.

As per the government data, more than 56% of funds were spent on publicity from 2014-15 to 2018-19. Less than 25% of the funds were released to districts and states, and the government did not release more than 19 percent of the funds. Minister of state Ministry of Women and Child Development, Virendra Kumar Khatik, claimed that the sex ratio in 53 out of 161 districts under the scheme declined between 2014–15 and 2016-17. According to experts, the scheme's minimal success is due to the government's inability to release funds efficiently and its disproportionate focus on publicity rather than making initiatives in the health and education sectors.

In 2020, Women and Child Development Minister Smriti Irani, in a written response to the upper house, stated that during the current financial year, ₹96.71 crore (US$10 million) have been spent on advertisements for the Beti Bachao Beti Padhao scheme until September 17. She mentioned that in the financial year 2019-20, ₹23.67 crore (US$2.5 million) were spent, in 2018-19, ₹160 crore (US$17 million), in 2017-18, ₹135.71 crore (US$14 million), in 2016-17, ₹29.79 crore (US$3.2 million), in 2015-16, ₹24.54 crore (US$2.6 million), and in 2014-15, ₹18.91 crore (US$2.0 million) were spent on advertisements for this scheme. Irani also stated that in August, the National Council of Applied Economic Research (NCAER) had evaluated the Beti Bachao Beti Padhao scheme, which indicated a positive change in behavior towards girls.

In 2021, in Lok Sabha, according to the Parliamentary committee on the Empowerment of Women, 78.91% funds for 'Beti Bachao Beti Padhao' were spent on ads.
