= Ice stock sport at the 1936 Winter Olympics =

Demonstration sport

Ice stock sport was a demonstration sport at the 1936 Winter Olympics. Events were held on Lake Riessersee.

== Results ==
Three international events were held: men's target shooting, men's distance shooting, and men's team. The top three finishers in each event are shown. Five national events open only to German athletes were also held: men's target shooting, men's distance shooting, men's team, women's target shooting, and women's team.

=== Men's target shooting ===
Place	Nation	Athlete
1	Austria	Ignaz Reiterer
2	Germany	August Brunner
3	Czechoslovakia	Karl Wolfinger

=== Men's distance shooting ===
Place	Nation	Athlete
1	Austria	Georg Edenhauser
2	Austria	Friedrich Mosshammer
3	Germany	Ludwig Retzer

=== Men's team ===
Place	Nation	Team
1	Austria	Tirol
2	Germany	Miesbach
3	Germany	Steiermark
