= Abid Nabi =

Indian cricketer (born 1985)

Personal information
- Full name: Abid Nabi Ahanger
- Born: 26 December 1985 (age 40); Srinagar, Jammu and Kashmir, India
- Height: 6 ft 7 in (2.01 m)
- Batting: Right-handed
- Bowling: Right-arm fast

Domestic team information
- Years: Team
- 2004/05–2013/14: Jammu and Kashmir

Career statistics
Competition	FC	LA	T20
Matches	30	24	24
Runs scored	530	202	269
Batting average	12.92	11.22	12.22
100s/50s	0/1	0/0	0/0
Top score	54	44	39
Balls bowled	5,610	1,062	501
Wickets	108	26	20
Bowling average	28.91	41.69	28.65
5 wickets in innings	6	1	0
10 wickets in match	0	0	0
Best bowling	6/91	5/50	2/13
Catches/stumpings	11/–	4/–	10/–
- Source: ESPNcricinfo, 22 September 2014

Abid Nabi (born 26 December 1985) is an Indian cricketer who plays for Jammu and Kashmir. He is a right-arm fast bowler and is identified as one of the fastest bowlers in India. He also played for the Delhi Giants in the now-defunct Indian Cricket League.

His best bowling analysis is 6 for 91 against Himachal Pradesh in his fourth match. He took 4 for 42 and 5 for 27 in the victory over Kerala in 2009–10.
