= Mohammad Sarfaraz =

Indian ice stock sport athlete

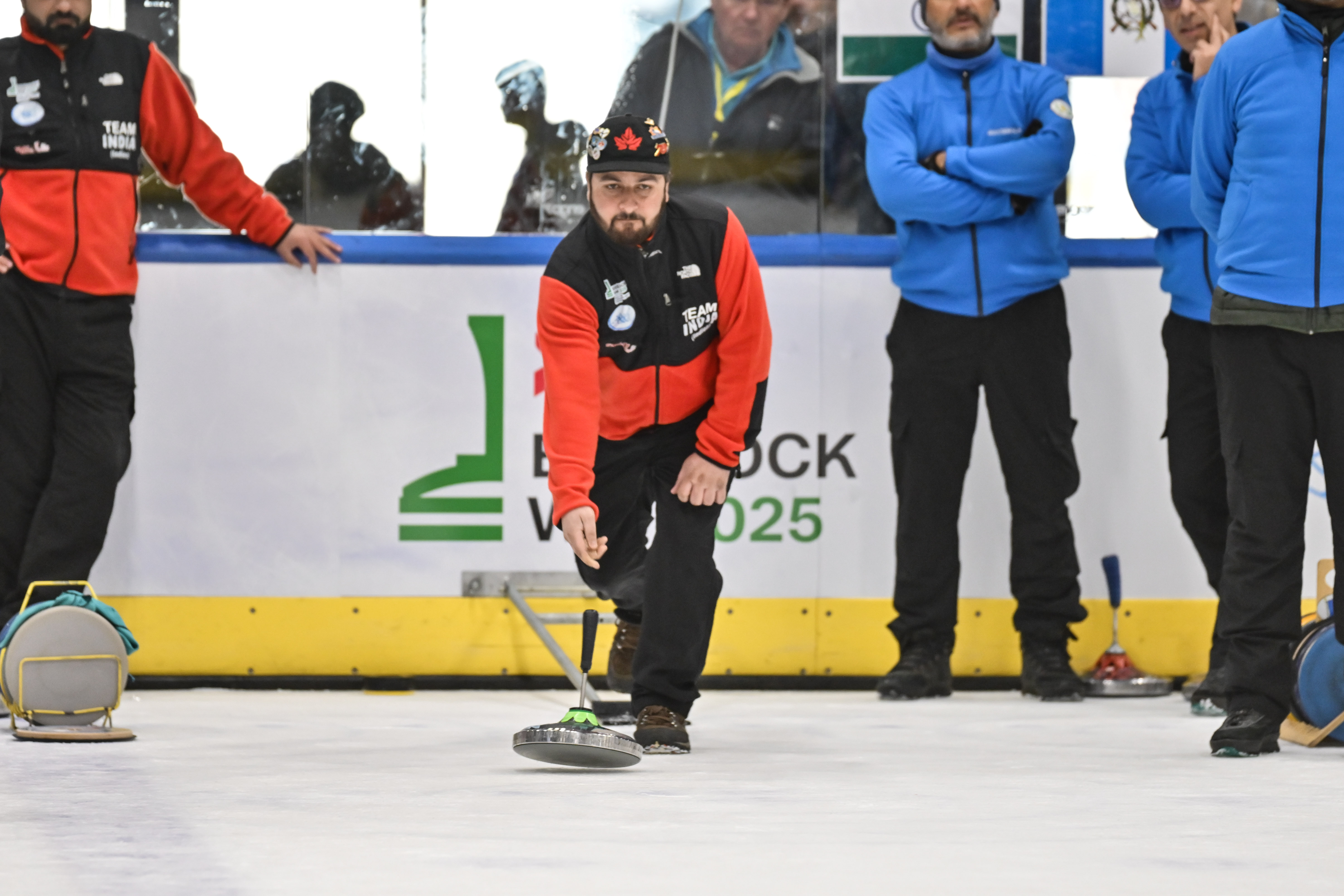
- Born: 10 October 1990 (age 35); Srinagar, Jammu and Kashmir, India
- Other name: Sarfi
- Citizenship: India
- Style: Right hand
- Parent(s): Bashir Ahmad and Sabreena Begum
- Website: https://in.linkedin.com/in/mohammad-sarfaraz-a1b68215

Mohammad Sarfaraz, known as Sarfi, is an Indian international ice stock sport athlete. Sarfi has a right hand style and has represented India at an international level. He finished in 11th place in the team competition at the 12th Ice Stock Sport World Championship held in Amstetten, Austria in 2018.

Sarfaraz began playing ice stock sport in 2014. He has captained the Indian ice stock sport national team since 2018. He is currently Asia’s highest scorer in Target Competition, achieving a score of score of 154 in Single’s Target Event China International Cup 2019 in Harbin. He is also the head coach of senior men and women teams for Ice Stock Sport in Jammu and Kashmir. He also monitors the progress of J&K A and J&K under-19 Stock sports teams.

Mohammad Sarfaraz has represented the India national ice stock sport team at multiple competitions. He was part of the Jammu & Kashmir team that won the gold medal at the 12th Winter National Ice Stock Championship. Sarfaraz also participated in international competitions, including the 15th Ice Stock World Championship 2025 in Kapfenberg and Stanz, Austria.

== Tournaments ==
=== National ===
Season	Tournament	Location	Team	Result	Reference
2025–2026	Winter National Ice Stock Championship	Gulmarg, Jammu and Kashmir, India	Jammu and Kashmir	Gold	

=== International ===
Year	Championship	Location	Team ranking
2018	12th World Ice Stock Sport Championship	Amstetten, Austria	11th
2019	China International Cup	Harbin, China	Target Competition–154 points
2020	13th Ice Stock Sport World Championship	Regen, Germany	9th
2025	15th Ice Stock Sport World Championship	Kapfenberg and Stanz, Austria	7th
