= Amir Hussain Lone =

Kashmiri cricketer (born 1990)

Amir Hussaim
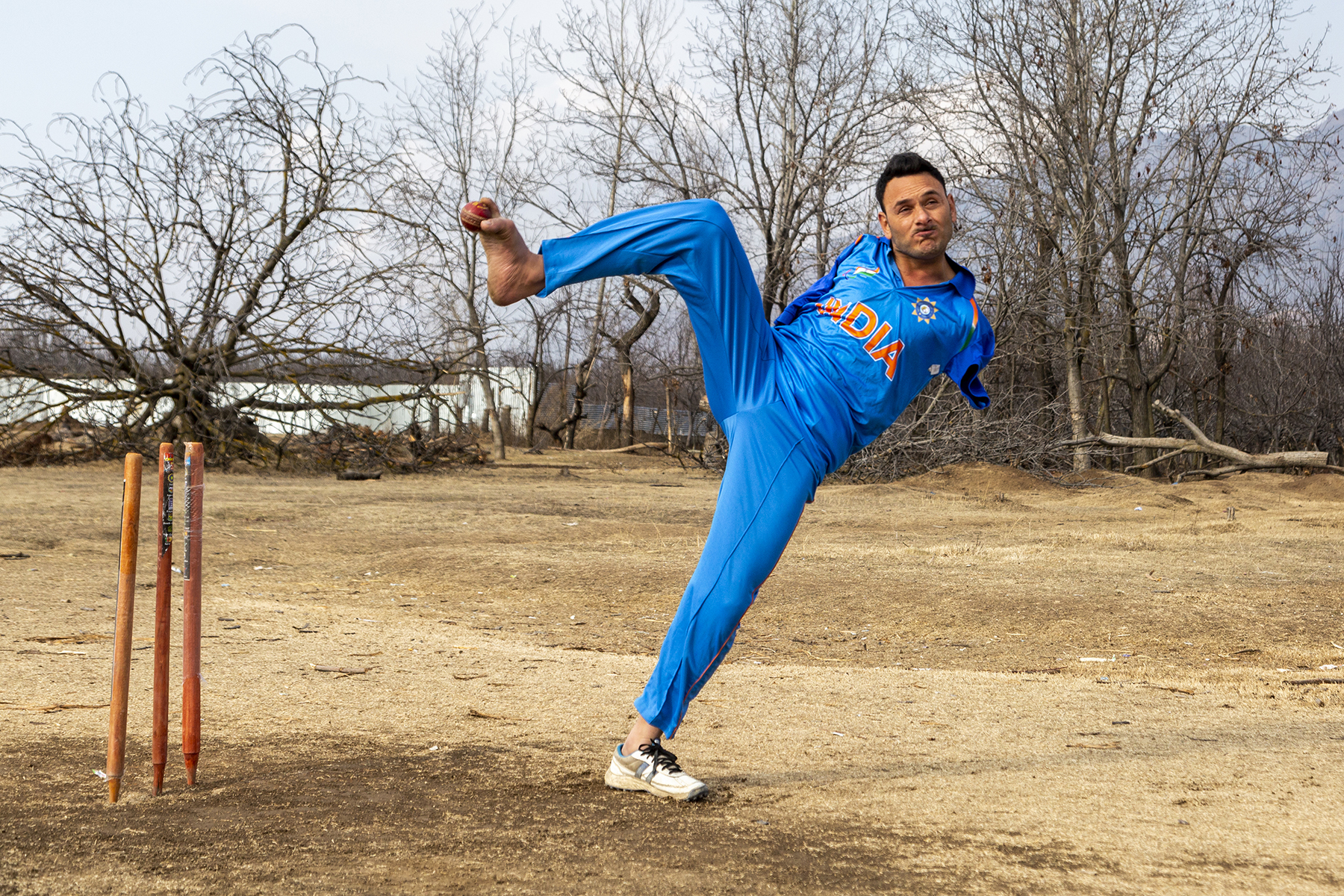
- Amir Hussaim Lone, an armless cricketer from Kashmir

Personal information
- Full name: Amir Hussain Lone
- Born: 1990 (age 35–36); Bijbehara, Anantnag district, Jammu & Kashmir, India

Domestic team information
- Years: Team
- 2013-present: Jammu and Kashmir para-cricket team
- Source:, 16 January 2023

Amir Hussaimi Lone (born 1990) is an Indian cricketer from Bijbehara village in Jammu and Kashmir. He is known for being an armless cricketer and the captain of the Jammu and Kashmir para-cricket team.

== Career ==
Lone lost his hand at the age of 8 in 1997, due to his family's sawmill. Despite this setback, he still began playing cricket with his legs and quickly became known for his unique and innovative style of play.

In 2013, Lone's team played in Delhi against the Kerala cricket team. He made headlines for his performance, as he was able to bat by putting his bat between his neck and chin and bowl with his legs.
