= Tajamul Islam =

Indian kickboxer (born 2008)

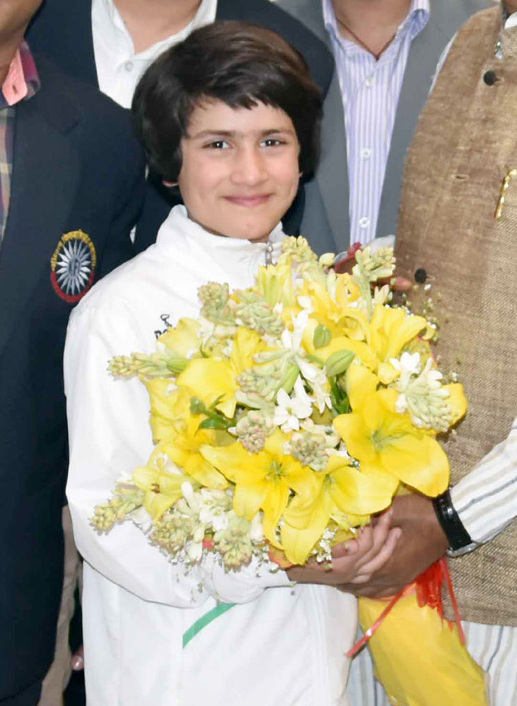
- Islam in 2016

Personal information
- Born: December 2008 (age 17) Tarkpora, Bandipora district, Jammu and Kashmir, India
- Occupations: Academy owner and coach
- Height: 1.55 m (5 ft 1 in)

Sport
- Sport: kickboxing

Tajamul Islam (born December 2008) is an Indian kickboxer and coach from the Bandipora district in Jammu and Kashmir. An advocate for young women to have access to education and opportunities to succeed, she is a campaign ambassador for the Government of India’s Beti Bachao, Beti Padhao initiative.

She is the world's youngest kickboxing champion, and the first Kashmiri, having won a sub-junior world championship at 7 years old. After denouncing the lack of sport facilities in the region, she opened her own martial art academy where she mentors and trains hundreds of young girls to compete in kickboxing.

A recipient of several awards, including the Jammu and Kashmir Government State Award and the 2021 Kashmir Excellence Award; she was named as one of CNN-News18 Indian of the Year 2022 nominee for her efforts and achievements, running a successful martial art academy at only 13-year-old.

== Biography ==
Islam was born in December 2008 in Tarkpora, a remote village in the Bandipora district of the Kashmir Valley. She started kickboxing and wushu at age 6 after joining a local martial arts academy, Islam trained in an open field with makeshift apparatus while studying at the Indian Army's Goodwill School.

=== World's youngest kickboxing champion ===
At age 7 she won India's sub-junior National Kickboxing Championship, held at Talkatora Stadium in New Delhi, after defeating a 13-year-old opponent. She became the youngest female to win a national kickboxing competition. In March 2016 she became the youngest gold medalist in the state-level Wushu Championships. In November she won the sub-junior World Kickboxing Championship in Italy, after winning six fights in five days, in the under-9 category, becoming the World's youngest kickboxing champion at age 7.

=== Advocacy ===
According to the BBC Islam became an inspiration for the youth and especially for girls, as Kashmir's conservative society can frown upon girls playing outdoor sports and social stigma and gender inequality often discourage them from taking up sports. Her success was described as contributing to shatter the glass ceiling, by motivating Kashmir women to practice and even choose sport as a career, during his monthly radio show, India Prime Minister Narendra Modi encouraged others to emulate her. In 2017 in a social media post, Islam criticised the Jammu & Kashmir government over the lack of sports facilities, poor infrastructure, lack of equipment and absence of sport coaches, accusing them of false promises. After that video went viral, the President of the state's sports council agreed to release some funding towards local sports facilities. In March 2017 she asked Sports Minister Vijay Goel in a meeting that his ministry officially recognise the sport of kickboxing so that "children like me can get inspired to learn".

In 2016 she called for the Indian government to find a solution to the Kashmir issue and "address the pain and agony of Kashmiri people". In an interview with the Times of India while in Mumbai attending a conference on women empowerment, she emphasised again the importance of empowering girls. In 2017, film producer Mushtaq Nadiadwala announced having secured the rights for a biopic about Islam with writer Shibani Bathija working on a script about her life.

In June 2018 she was featured in a UN Women music video among other Indian women achievers from across different sections of society "to inspire women and girls across India and beyond, and spread the message – that women have the right to live a life on their terms, and the right to make their own choices." Her story has been called "a shining beacon of hope for young Kashmiri women who wish to break free from being relegated to the backseat".

=== Academy owner ===
In 2019, at the age of 11 and with her father's help, Islam started her own kickboxing academy Haider Sports Academy in Bandipora where she trains young girls to compete in kickboxing. In January 2022 her academy had expanded to include more than 700 students spread over six locations. The main academy is located in the local sports stadium, Muslim Abaad in Bandipora, all the other branches are located near government schools. In total the academy employs 40–45 kickboxing coaches.

After meeting with Islam Mehbooba Mufti, the head of government of Jammu and Kashmir called her achievements and boxing academy in Bandipora "a source of inspiration for Kashmiri girls". In July 2021, Islam received a Kashmir Excellence Award. In October 2022 she was nominated for a CNN-News18 Indian of the Year award for her achievements running a successful martial art school, while the same month, India's Minister of Home Affairs Amit Shah, called her "India’s talented daughter" and "an inspiration to every Indian" after meeting her.

On 22 October 2021 she returned to competition to win a second world title at the World Kickboxing Championship held in Cairo, in the under −14 category. In 2022 Islam gave a TEDx talk untitled: "How to become a world champion and the role of Family". In February 2023, on the way to a competition, she had to be evacuated by the Army, alongside 13 boys and 11 officials and coaches from her Academy after a mudslide closed the Jammu–Srinagar National Highway.

Since 2020 her students have won several medals in state and national level championships which propped the local administration to help support her academy. Out of her 720 students, Islam also trains young women in self-defense.

=== Continuing advocacy ===
On International Women's Day, on 8 March 2023, she was invited to an event organised by the Indian Army in Kupwara where she gave a speech to motivate young local women to follow their dreams despite adversities. She talked about the challenges she faced in her own house and from society, about a time when a lot of people tried to dissuade her to follow her passion. In April 2023, she was listed in News18 Rising India Summit 2023, a summit honouring "extraordinary social impact created by ordinary people".

== Awards and recognition ==
- November 2016: National Health Mission, Bandipora district (brand ambassador)
- December 2016: Received an award presented by Mehbooba Mufti, Chief Minister of Jammu and Kashmir, during a ceremony at Srinagar Indoor Stadium.
- January 2017: Jammu and Kashmir Government State Award for "Outstanding contribution in the field of sport".
- Government of India's Beti Bachao, Beti Padhao campaign (brand ambassador)
- 2017: featured on the J&K Bank 2017 "Pride of Paradise" calendar as one of twelve "talented youths" of the state.
- June 2018: featured in UN Women music video, among other Indian women achievers.
- September 2019: chosen by Women's Web amongst 10 Kashmiri Women Achievers
- March 2020: listed in News Vibes of India "10 extraordinary women and their stories of courage”.
- July 2021: Kashmir Excellence Award 2021.
- January 2022: Pramerica Emerging Visionaries, Spirit of Community Award.
- January 2022: Inspiring Young Achiever, News18 TV Program: BYJU’S Young Genius Season 2.
- August 2022: listed in Paninwath’s Kashmiri Women Achievers
- October 2022: CNN–News18 Indian of the Year (nominee)
- November 2022: listed in "Rising Beyond the Ceiling: Inspiring Muslim Women of Jammu & Kashmir"
- April 2023: listed in News18 Rising India Summit 2023.
