= Khelo India Winter Games =

Annual national winter games of India

- Abbreviation: KIWG
- Purpose: Nationwide state-wise multi-winter sports competition
- Frequency: Annual
- Inaugurated: 2020
- Headquarters: New Delhi, India
- Website: Khelo India Winter Games

Khelo India Winter Games (KIWG) are the national level multidisciplinary grassroot winter games of India. Events include skiing, alpine skiing, Nordic skiing, snow rugby, Ice stock sport, snow baseball, mountaineering, snowshoe running, ice hockey, figure skating and speed skating. It was decided to hold the first Khelo India Winter Games in 2020 after the success of multiple editions of the Khelo India Youth Games.

== Venues ==
The first Khelo India Winter Games were held in two legs at two different venues:

1. Khelo India Ladakh Winter Games – Leh
2. Khelo India Jammu and Kashmir Winter Games – Gulmarg

== Participation ==
Events are categorised into age groups as well as according to block, district and union territory and state levels.

== Editions ==
Khelo India Winter Games
Edition	Year	Host(s)		Participation	Sports	1st team				2nd team				3rd team				Ref
Edition	Year	Host(s)		Participation	Sports	Gold Medal	Silver Medal	Bronze Medal	T	Gold Medal	Silver Medal	Bronze Medal	T	Gold Medal	Silver Medal	Bronze Medal	T	Ref
1	2020	Leh	Gulmarg	955 athletes (649 men & 306 women)	17	Jammu and Kashmir				Services				Uttarakhand				
1	2020	25 February	7–11 March	955 athletes (649 men & 306 women)	17	26	29	21	76	8	6	7	21	5	2	6	13	
2	2021	Leh	Gulmarg	1,375 athletes	14	Jammu and Kashmir				Karnataka				Maharashtra				
2	2021	26 February – 2 March		1,375 athletes	14	11	18	5	34	5	0	4	9	3	3	2	8	
3	2023	Gulmarg		More than 1,500 athletes	11	Jammu and Kashmir				Maharashtra				Himachal Pradesh				
3	2023	10 February – 14 February		More than 1,500 athletes	11	26	25	25	76	18	8	6	27	10	14	7	31	
4	2024	Leh	Gulmarg	More than 500 athletes	7	Services				Karnataka				Maharashtra				
4	2024	2–6 February	21–25 February	More than 500 athletes	7	10	5	6	21	9	2	0	11	7	8	7	22	
5	2025	Leh	Gulmarg	More than 700 athletes	6	Services				Himachal Pradesh				Ladakh				
5	2025	23–27 January	9–12 March	More than 700 athletes	6	7	5	6	18	6	5	7	18	4	2	1	7	
6	2026	Leh	Gulmarg	More than 700 athletes	6	Services				Himachal Pradesh				Haryana				
6	2026	20–26 January	23–26 February	More than 700 athletes	6	9	6	8	23	6	7	1	11	4	1	2	7	

== Inauguration and closing ceremony ==
The first winter games were inaugurated by Minister of State for Youth Affairs and Sports Kiren Rijiju. The second winter games were inaugurated virtually by Prime Minister Narendra Modi. The closing ceremony witnesses festivities and cultural events.

== Participation by Indian international athletes ==
- Aanchal Thakur participated in Skiing Events
- Aadil Manzoor Peer participated in Ice stock sport Events.
- Eklavya Jagal participated in short track speed skating Events

== See also ==
- National Games of India
- Khelo India Beach Games
- Khelo India Youth Games
- Khelo India Para Games
- Khelo India University Games
