= Ice stock sport =

Winter sport somewhat similar to curling

Icestock Sport Bavarian curling
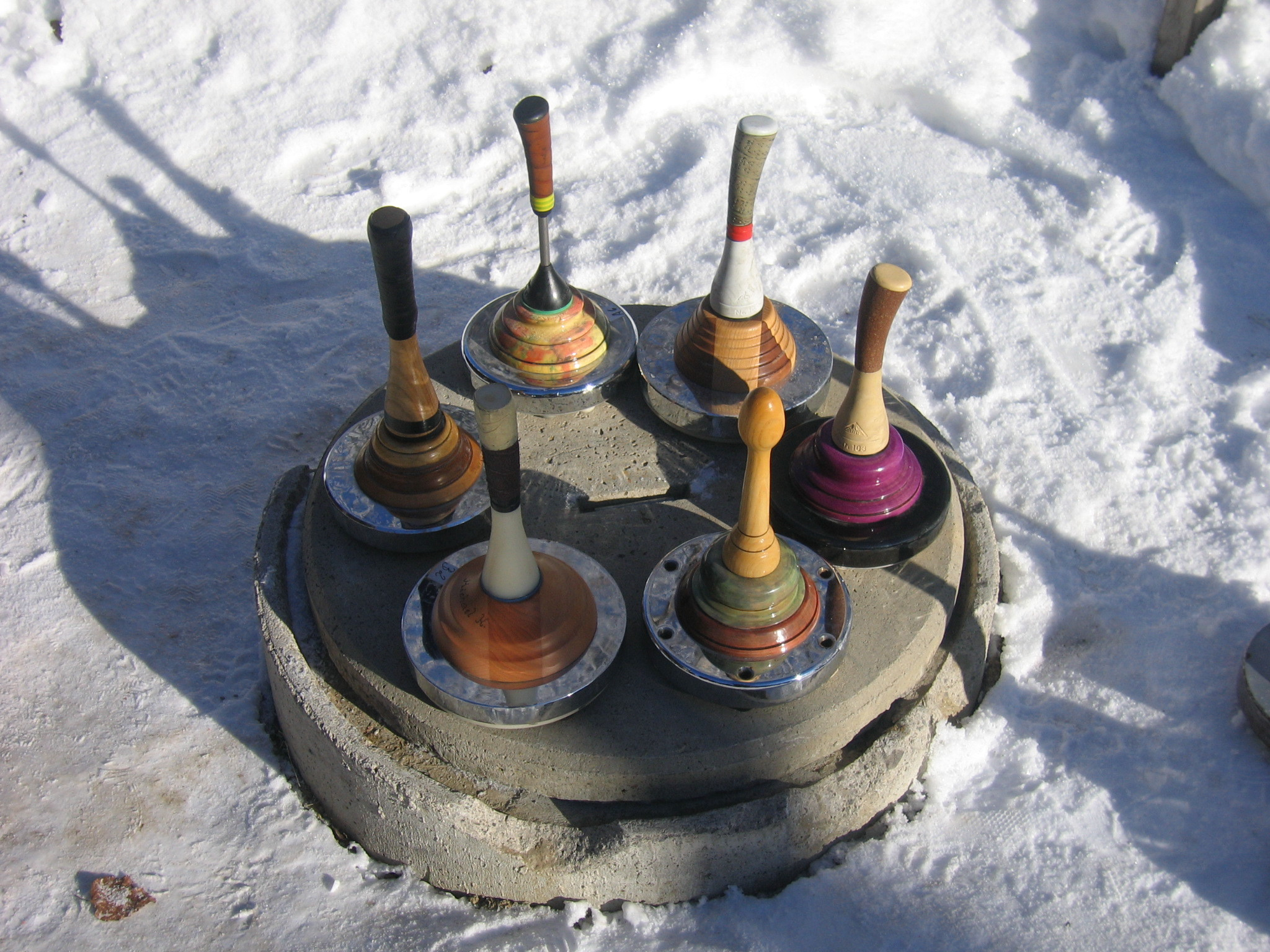
- Highest governing body: International Federation Icestocksport (IFI)
- First played: Probably 13th century Scandinavia, maybe earlier

Characteristics
- Contact: No
- Type: Individual sport; Team sport; Winter sport; Summer sport
- Equipment: 1: Stock Body; 2: Stock Handle; 3: Plate

Presence
- Olympic: No, but given IOC full recognition, June 2018; Demonstrated at the Winter Olympic Games on two occasions
- Paralympic: No
- World Games: No

Bavarian curling or Icestock sport (from the German: "Eisstocksport", sometimes separated in English, i.e., "Ice stock sport") is a winter sport, somewhat similar to curling. In German, it is more commonly known as Eisstockschießen or simply Stockschießen among many other names. Although the sport is traditionally played on an ice surface, events are also held on tarmac in the summer. In such a case, it is often simply referred to as Stocksport.

Competitors slide ice stocks over an ice surface, aiming for a target, or to cover the longest distance. Ice stocks have a gliding surface, to which a stick (ca 30 cm) is attached. The sport is mostly practised in southern Germany, Austria and Trentino-Alto Adige/Südtirol in Italy.

Ice stock has been demonstrated at the Winter Olympic Games on two occasions. Ice stock is also an event in India's Khelo India Winter Games program. The most recent world championship for Ice stock has been the 2022 Ice stock sport World Championships for Women and Men, held on February 22–27 February 2022 in Ritten, Italy in the central village of Klobenstein (Collalbo). It was the 14th time the event has taken place.

== History ==
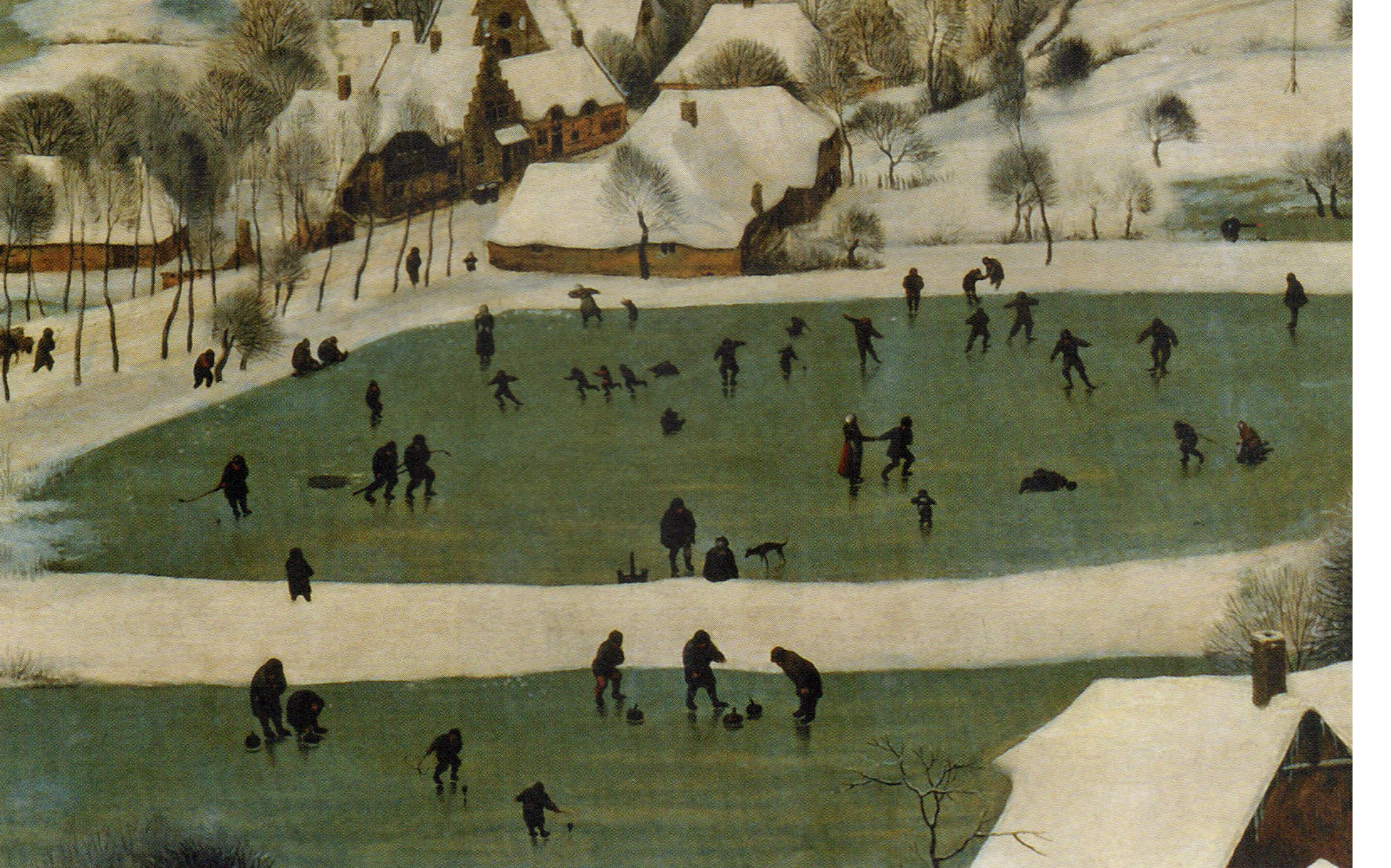
Detail from Brueghel's 1565 The Hunters in the Snow, showing Eisstock being played

The first written mention of ice stock sport came shortly before Christmas in 1192; messengers arrived to bring news of the capture of Richard the Lionheart to Leopold V, Duke of Austria, who was playing ice stock on the frozen river Danube at Vienna. The sport was probably also played in Scandinavia by the 13th century. The first paintings showing ice stock sport being played stem from the 16th century from the Alpine region and the Low Countries, with Brueghel's The Hunters in the Snow from 1565 being an example. It would take until the 1930s before it became a formal sport. A German federation was established in 1934, and German championships were established two years later.

European Championships were first held in 1951, and World Championships were first held in 1983, after the International Federation Icestock Sport (IFI) had been established. Icestock World Championships has been held for men and women since 1983.

== Disciplines ==
There are several disciplines in ice stock sport, of which teams target shooting, individual target and distance shooting are contested in international championships.

=== Team Game ===
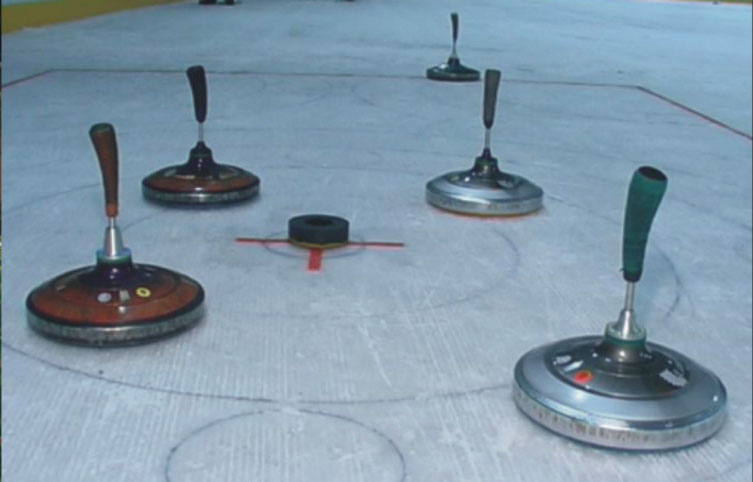
Game in progress

In a team game, two teams try to shoot the sticks as close as possible to the "Daube" from the starting point. The stave is placed on the center cross before the start of a turn. If the stave is changed in its position within the target field by an effect that is valid according to the rules, it remains in this new position, which is also decisive for the scoring. It is returned to the center cross if it is outside the target space. There are six turns in total.

A team usually consists of four players, with each player making one try per round. The aim is to get one of your own team's sticks in the best position (i.e. closer to the stave than your opponent). Only sticks that are within the target field are scored.

One of the two teams starts the game by trying to play one of their sticks into the target field through the so-called measure. The opposing team then plays with the aim of getting one of their sticks in the best position. The positions of the sticks already in the target field may be changed by the new sticks. If a stick comes to a standstill outside of the target field, it will be removed. Opposing sticks that are in a better position may be shot out of the field.

The teams, called "Moarschaft" in the language of stick shooters, shoot until all sticks have been played, whereby it is always the team's turn that does not currently have the best position to score. When both teams have played with all their sticks, the turn is over and the team whose stick is in the best position gets stick points. Three stick points are awarded for the stick in the best position, for each additional stick of the same team that is closer to the stave than the next stick of the opponent, there are two more points. If one or more sticks of the team that has a stick in the best position and whose turn it is because the opponent has no more sticks available does not reach or touch the field, three stick points are awarded for the first stick and two for all others points deducted. A game has six turns, i.e. passes. The face-off changes with each turn, regardless of the outcome of the last round. The team with the greater number of stock points receives two profit or game points, the other none. In the event of a tie, each team gets one point. The team with the most winning points wins the tournament. If two teams have the same number of winning points, the winner decidesQuotient of all own and opposing stock points (the stock note).

=== Team Target Shooting ===
The target competition is held in 4 rounds with 6 attempts each. Up to 60 points can be achieved in each round. For the overall ranking, 2 rounds (= 2 × 4 rounds) are usually played. In championships, the top-ranked players often play another 1 to 2 rounds in a final for victory. The target competition is held both as an individual competition and as a team competition. In the individual competition, one player plays all rounds and is scored individually. In the team competition, a different player plays each round. For the evaluation, the results of the individual players are added together.

1st round: 6 attempts are made on the middle target rings, in which the player's stick should be brought as close as possible to the center cross. The ring that the stick reaches is counted. Rings count from outside to inside: 2, 4, 6, 8 and 10 points.

2nd round: 6 attempts are played on a target stick, which is placed alternately in the marked circles A to F. In the 6 attempts it is important to move the target stick placed in the circles out of the target field, whereby the player's stick should remain in the target field. Depending on the final position of the poles, 0, 2, 5 or 10 points are awarded for each attempt.

3rd round: 3 attempts are made to the left and right rear target (target fragments), in which the player's stick should be brought as close as possible to the center of the rings. The ring that the stick reaches is counted. Rings count from outside to inside: 2, 4, 6, 8 and 10 points.

4th round: 6 attempts are played on a target stick, which is placed in the marked circles A, B, G, H, E and F in sequence. In attempts 1 and 2, the goal is to hit the target stick in such a way that the player's stick comes to a standstill as close as possible to the center cross. In attempts 3 and 4, the aim is to hit the shooting stick so that it comes to a standstill as close as possible to the center cross. In attempts 5 and 6, the aim is to move the shooting stick from the target rings to the rear rings. In attempts 1 to 6, the respective ring that the stick reaches is scored. The rings count 2, 4, 6, 8 and 10 points from the outside to the inside.

=== Distance Competition ===
The technique of long-distance shooting differs significantly from that of team shooting, since it is not necessary to be precise in the length and direction of the shot, but to accelerate the stick as much as possible.

In the distance competition, a single player tries to shoot his stick as far as possible. The athlete has five attempts in the competition, the best of which counts. These must be delivered in a funnel-shaped path. If the stick leaves the lane, the attempt is only valid up to the point of departure. The dimensions of the track change depending on the season. The summer track on asphalt or concrete pavement is slightly narrower than the winter track on (natural) ice. The funnel can be extended as desired, which is also necessary when you consider that the world record is 566 m (achieved by Manfred Zieglgruber, SV Unterneukirchen (D) on Lake Seeon ).

The shooter stands on a stand in the middle of the semicircle when firing the shot. He has space to run out up to the 7 meter line, which is not a matter of course due to the momentum and the kinetic energy acting on the athlete.

All players use the same stick body and sole, but are allowed to use their own sticks. A team score can also be created by summing up the results of several players.

From the spectator's point of view, this discipline has the advantage that even a layperson can judge whether an attempt was successful or not.

== Ice surface ==
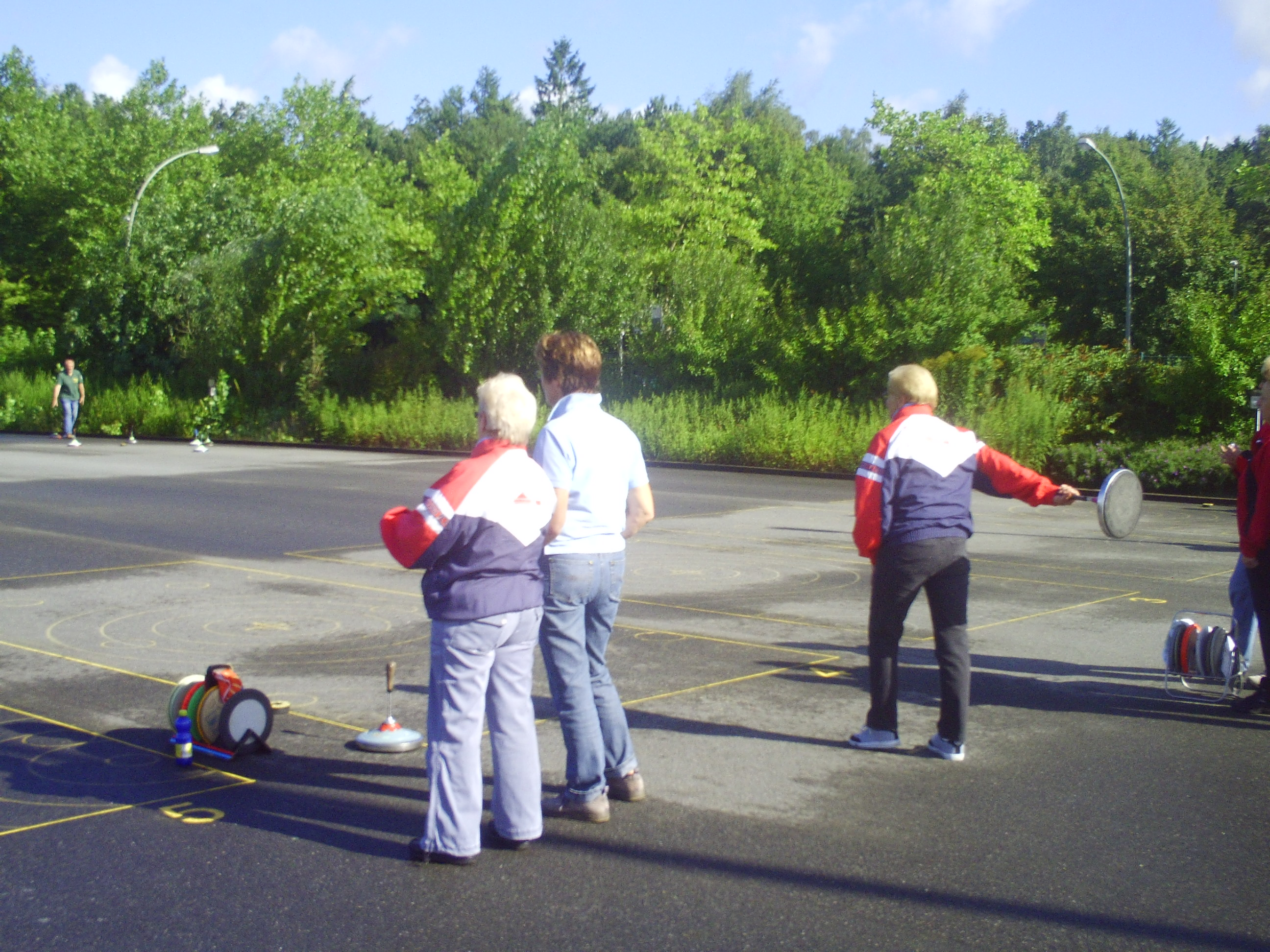
Icestock Tournament in Summer

During the winter season, icestock sport uses a sheet of ice with areas marked off for play. The winter version uses either natural outdoor ice or an indoor ice rink with specific dimensions, lines, and markings for icestock.

== International Federation Icestocksport ==
The international governing body for the sport is the International Federation Icestocksport.

During the International Olympic Committee (IOC) Session in Tokyo in 2021, the IOC approved full recognition of International Federation Icestocksport.

The International Federation Icestocksport (IFI) is honoured to announce that the IOC Session in Tokyo today has approved the full recognition of IFI. The vote of the Session was given unanimously for the six International Federations, one of them being the International Federation Icestocksport. The IOC Executive Board had granted provisional recognition by the IOC to IFI in June 2018. The IOC Session acknowledged by their vote today the significant development of IFI in the years since the provisional recognition was achieved.

— IOC Session in Tokyo approves full recognition of IFI – International Federation Icestocksport, Kashmir News (July 21, 2021)

== See also ==
- Ice rink
