= Winter sports in India =

Winter sports are common in India in the Himalayan areas. Ski tournaments take place every winter in Gulmarg, Kashmir and Manali. Winter sports are generally more common in the northern states of Jammu and Kashmir, Himachal Pradesh, Uttarakhand (formerly Uttaranchal), Sikkim and Arunachal Pradesh. Skiing, snow rugby, snow cycling and snow football are few of the common sports played in India. Skiing is more popular although India has taken part in Luge in Winter Olympics since 1998. The Bandy Federation of India is headquarters are in Mandi in Himachal Pradesh. Luge is practiced in a big way by the mountain residents in an improvised form called 'Reri'.

Shiva Keshavan is the only Indian to have won medals in international meets in winter sports (Asian Gold 2011, Asian Silver 2009, Asian Bronze 2008, Asian Silver (Doubles) 2005, Asian Bronze (Singles) 2005), and to have participated in four Olympic Games. He is currently the Asian Speed record holder at 134.4 km/h, making him the fastest man in Asia on ice.

Ski-mountaineering is another form of skiing, usually conducted in remote areas. There are beginner and intermediate level of slopes where skiers can choose from. It is sort of wilderness skiing. It is also called back country skiing. It was introduced in Kashmir in 1979 when two local skiers Muhammad Yusuf and Mehraj Din undertook a ski - touring expedition to Lidder Valley. In 1984 a team of 10 skiers, led by Muhammad Yusuf, undertook an expedition from Lidder Valley to Sindh Valley over Sunmous Pass. It is still a record. With the passage of time ski-mountaineering has become a competitive sports. Championships are conducted in Europe regularly.

== List of National Sports award recipients in Winter Sports, showing the year, award, and gender ==
Year	Recipient	Award	Gender
2020	Shiva Keshavan	Arjuna Award	Male

== See also ==
- India at the Winter Olympics
- India at the Asian Winter Games
- Skiing in India
- Ice hockey in India
- Bandy in India
