= Gulmarg Wildlife Sanctuary =

Wildlife Sanctuary in Gulmarg

- IUCN category IV (habitat/species management area)
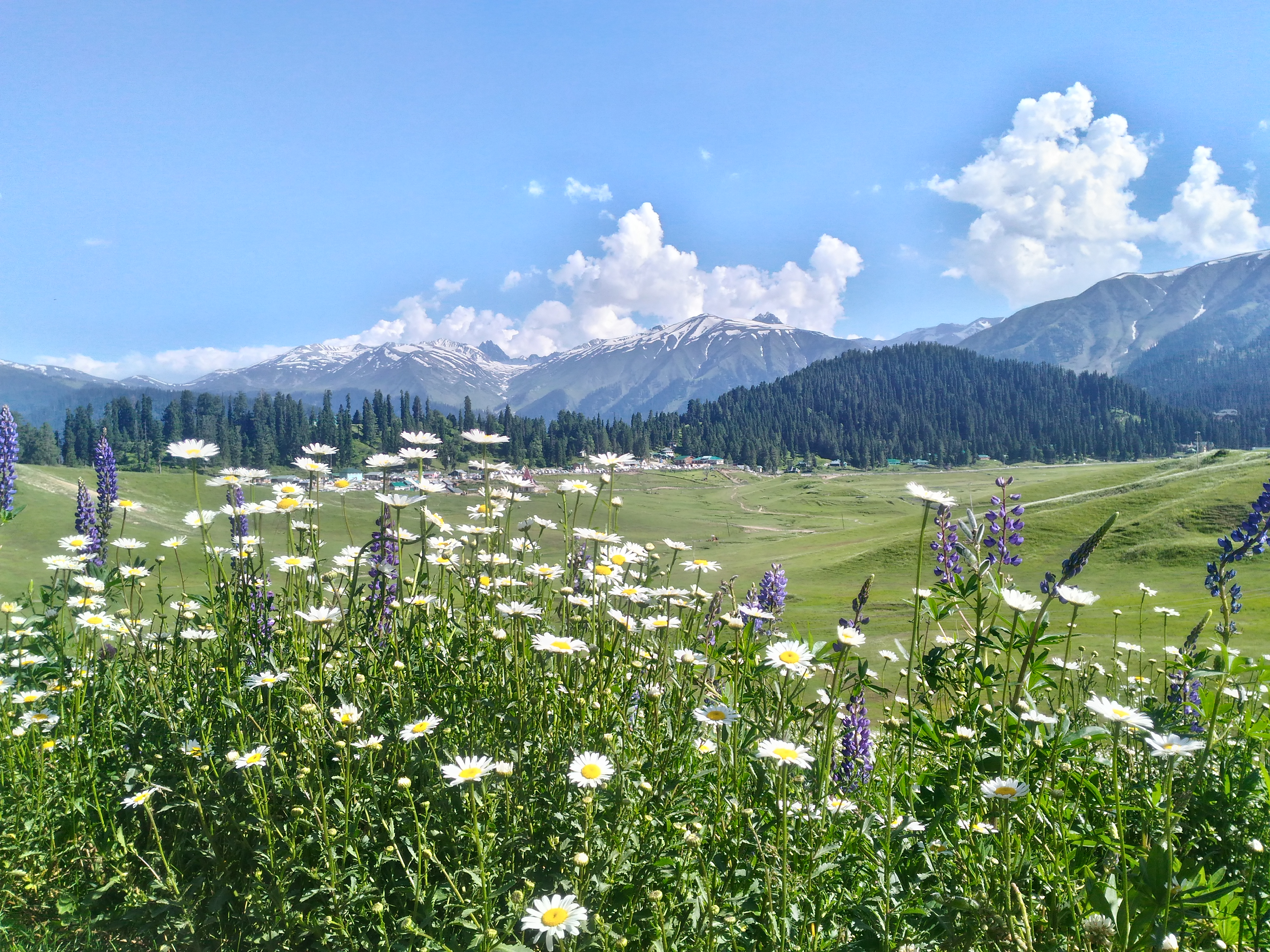
- Gulmarg Wildlife Sanctuary in Gulmarg, Baramulla district, Jammu and Kashmir, India

- Location within Jammu and Kashmir Location within India
- Interactive map of Gulmarg Wildlife Sanctuary
- Location: Gulmarg, Baramulla district, Jammu and Kashmir, India
- Nearest city: Baramulla city
- Coordinates: 34°04′44″N 74°21′43″E
- Area: 180 km^{2} (69 sq mi)
- Max. elevation: 4,300 metres (14,100 ft)
- Min. elevation: 2,400 metres (7,900 ft)
- Established: 1987
- Visitors: 3000 per day (Summer) (in 1979)
- Governing body: Department of Wildlife Protection

The Gulmarg Wildlife Sanctuary spread over 180 square kilometres (69 mi^{2}) is a protected area in Gulmarg, Baramulla district of Jammu and Kashmir, India. It is one of the most beautiful and attractive sanctuaries in J&K. The sanctuary offers a pass that'll lead you to poonch district. Kanternag peak, Apharwatt peak, Neel kanth peak etc are the well known mountains of the sanctuary.The sanctuary lies on the north-eastern side of the Pir Panjal mountain range and falls under the northwest Biogeographic Zone 2A. It lies 50 kilometres (31 mi) south-west of Srinagar and 26 kilometres (16 mi) from Baramulla. It is strategically very important for Indian armed forces due to its proximity to LOC(line of control). The sanctuary was first declared as a game reserve in 1981 and later upgraded to a sanctuary in 1987.

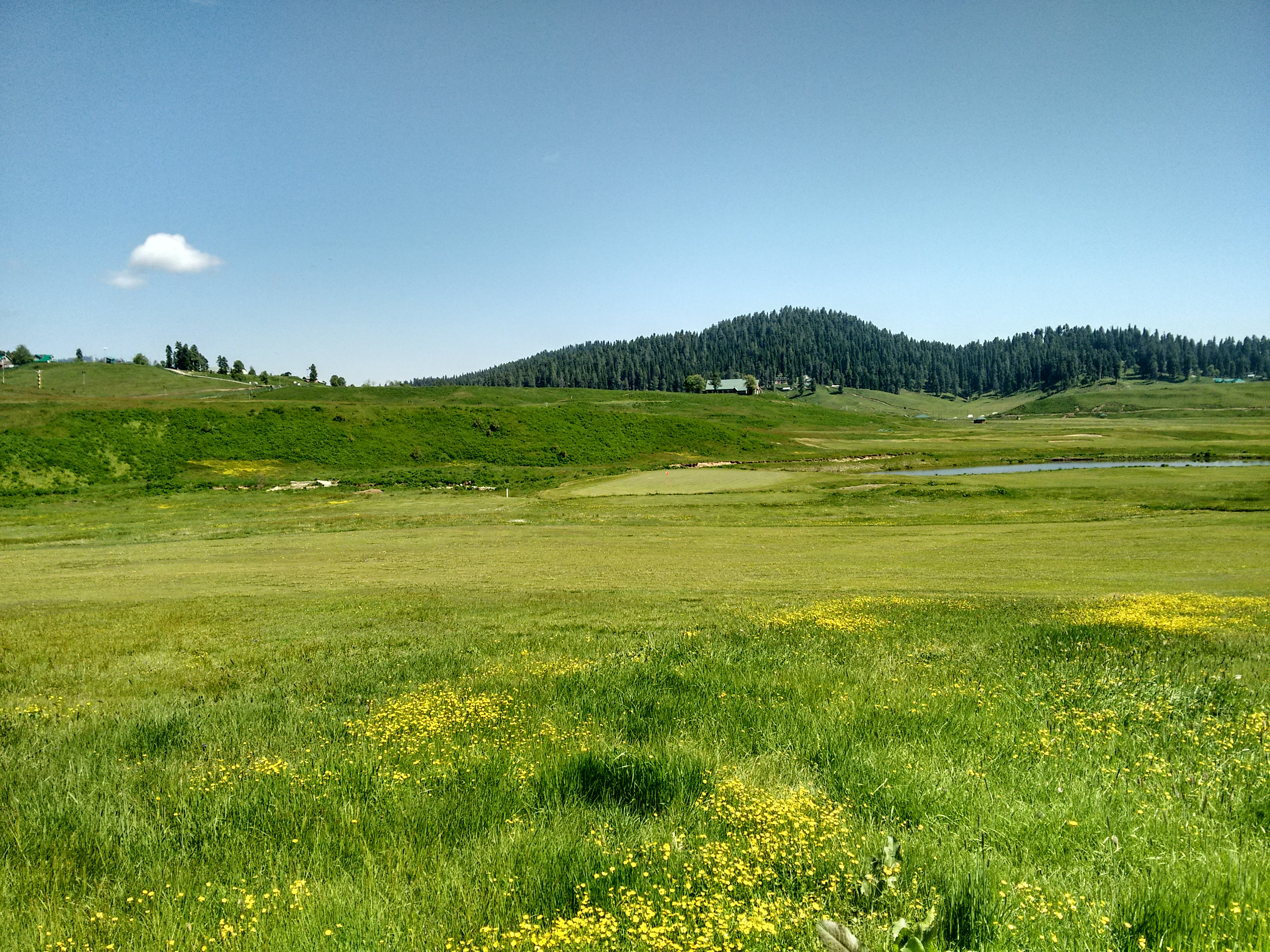
Gulmarg Golf Course in Gulmarg, Baramulla district, Jammu and Kashmir, India

== Geography ==
The Gulmarg Wildlife Sanctuary lies in the Pir Panjal Range of the Western Himalayas. The Gulmarg tourist resort including the Gulmarg Golf Club and the 6 kilometres (3.7 mi) long Gulmarg Gondola are surrounded by the sanctuary. The elevation of the sanctuary ranges from 2,400 metres (7,900 ft) to 4,300 metres (14,100 ft). It is surrounded by the forests of the Gulmarg basin and the upper catchment area of the Ferozpur stream. The sanctuary is bordered by the forest divisions of Jhelum Valley to the north and west, Poonch and Pir Panjal to the south and the Drang village to the east. The highly steep terrain of the upper reaches of Ferozpur gorge consists of Panjal volcanics, with exposed acidic lava flows. Limestone, shale, quartzite and slate occur throughout the sanctuary. The Gulmarg Wildlife Sanctuary has a temperate climate. Snowfall during the winter amounts most part of the precipitation.

== Flora and fauna ==
The vegetation of the Gulmarg Wildlife Sanctuary mainly consists of sub-alpine forests of silver fir (Abies pindrow), silver birch (Betula utilis) and blue pine. White and silver fir are restricted to moist aspects and is associated with Pinus griffithii, Taxus wallichiana and Picea smithiana at lower altitudes. Silver birch is spread out in the mountain ridges which borders the alpine pastures between 3,000 metres (9,800 ft) and 3,500 metres (11,500 ft). At lower altitudes, Pinus griffithi are predominant in the blue pine forests that surround the Gulmarg resort. They are mixed with spruce – Picea smithiana, maple – Acer cappadocicum and yew – Taxus wallichiana. The alpine meadows are dominated by the herbaceous flora of different species. These include corydalis, inula, potentilla, primula, gentiana, rumex and iris. Daffodils and jonquils of the genus narcissus, which were introduced have become naturalized. The sanctuary has also valuable resources of medicinal plants such as Saussurea costus (Jogi badshah), Picrorhiza kurroa and Jurinea dolomiaea.

The Gulmarg Wildlife Sanctuary has a recorded 95 bird species of different families including Kashmir flycatcher (Ficedula subrubra), Himalayan snowcock (Tetraogallus himalayensis), Impeyan monal (Lophophorus impejanus) and Koklass pheasant (Pucrasia macrolopha). There are 31 butterfly species reported from the sanctuary.

The Gulmarg Wildlife Sanctuary is noted for its wildlife. The mammals found in the sanctuary include Himalayan brown bear (Ursus arctos), Asiatic black bear (Ursus thibetanus), leopard (Panthera pardus), Black panther also in some rare cases, musk deer (Moschus crysogaster), Kashmir grey langur (Semnopithecus ajax), snow leopard (Uncia), Tibetan wolf (Canis lupus), red fox (Vulpes), leopard cat (Prionailurus bengalensis), jungle cat (Felis chaus), yellow-throated marten (Martes flavigula), Kashmir Stag, Himalayan tahr, barking deer, Tibetan antelope, pangolins, cougar, lynx, clouded leopard , bearded vulture, cranes, Himalayan griffon vulture , Egyptian vulture , and the only wildlife sanctuary in J&K to have migratory bald eagle. The sanctuary acts as a natural corridor in the movement of brown bear and markhor between Poonch and the Kashmir Valley forests.

== See also ==
- Dachigam National Park
- Hirpora Wildlife Sanctuary
- Overa-Aru Wildlife Sanctuary
