= Skiing in India =

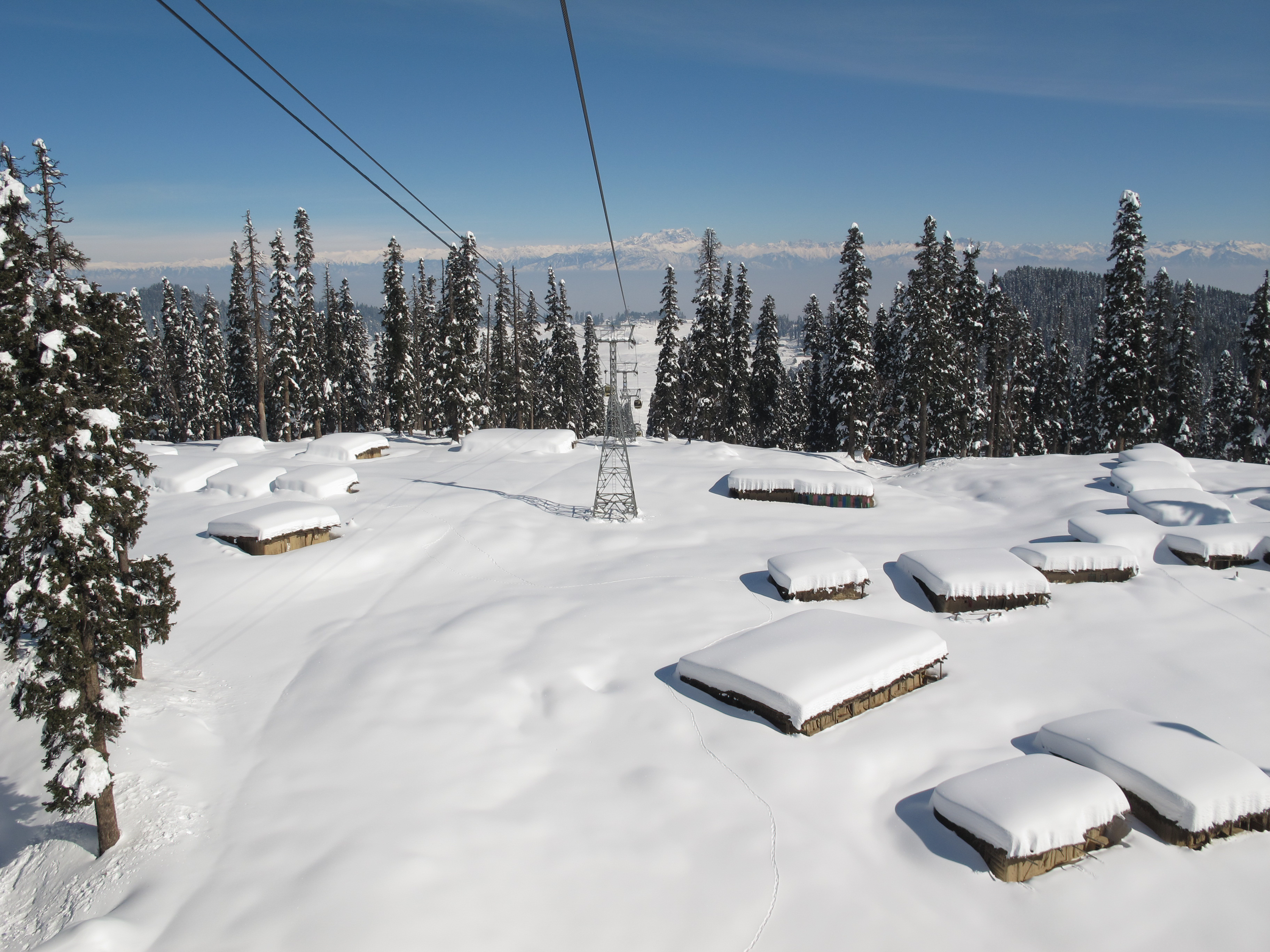
- View of the Himalayas from the Gulmarg Gondola
- Country: India
- Governing body: Indian Mountaineering Foundation
- National team: India

Skiing in India is centered in the northern states of India, where the Himalayas are situated. Skiing is administered by the Indian Mountaineering Foundation in India. The Himalayas provide an excellent skiing experience owing to their great height which allows long descents. Heliskiing is also gaining popularity in places like Manali Gulmarg and Drass. However, skiing in India suffers from lack of infrastructure. The security concerns near the Line of Control have reduced since 2002, which has led to an increase in skiing activity in the region. Some of the most popular skiing locations in India are Gulmarg in Jammu and Kashmir, Drass in Ladakh Union Territory and Solang in Himachal Pradesh and Auli in Uttarakhand. The skiing season in India is from January to March.

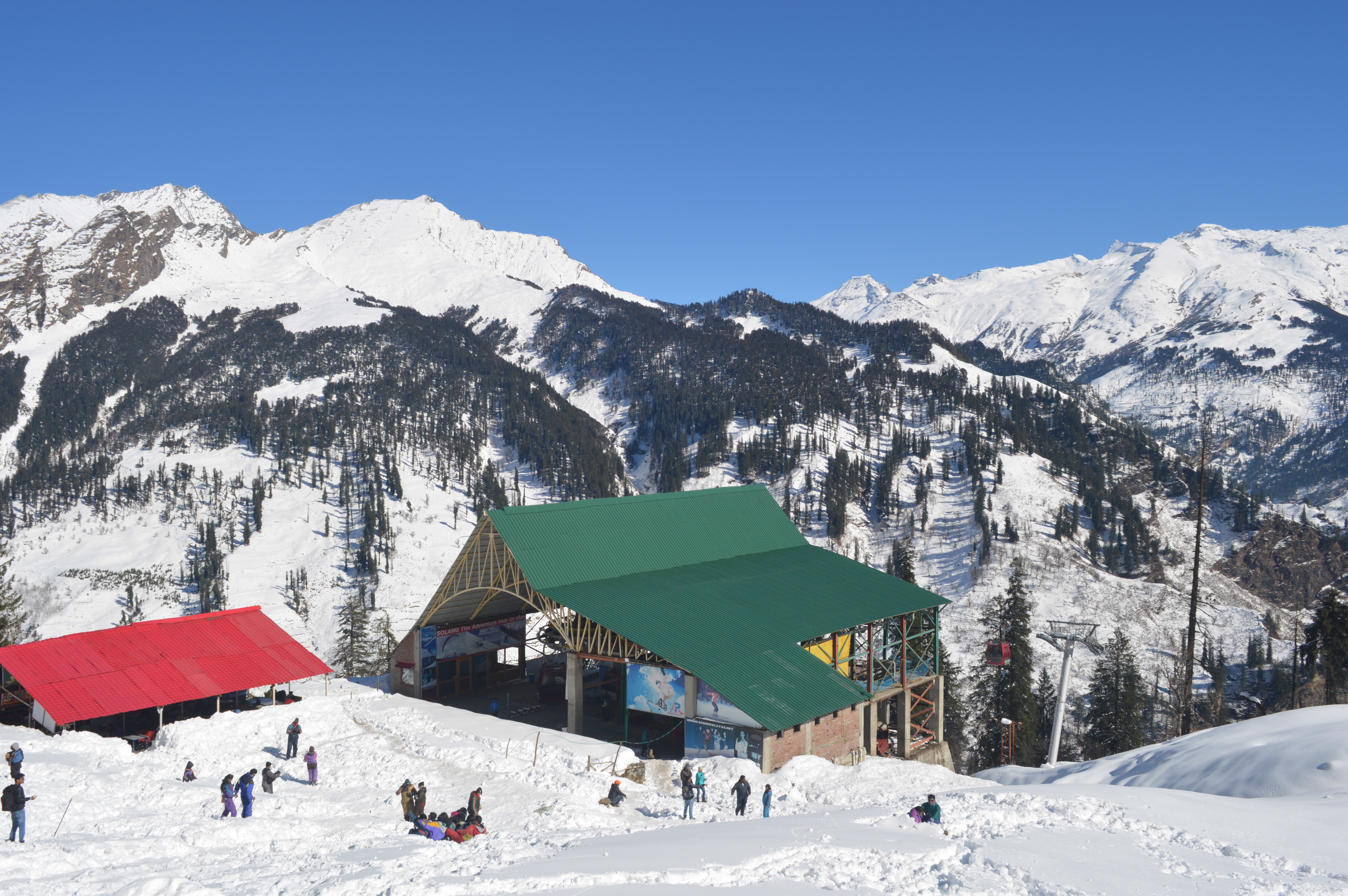
Skiing ropeway at Solang near Manali, Himachal Pradesh

== List of skiing destinations ==
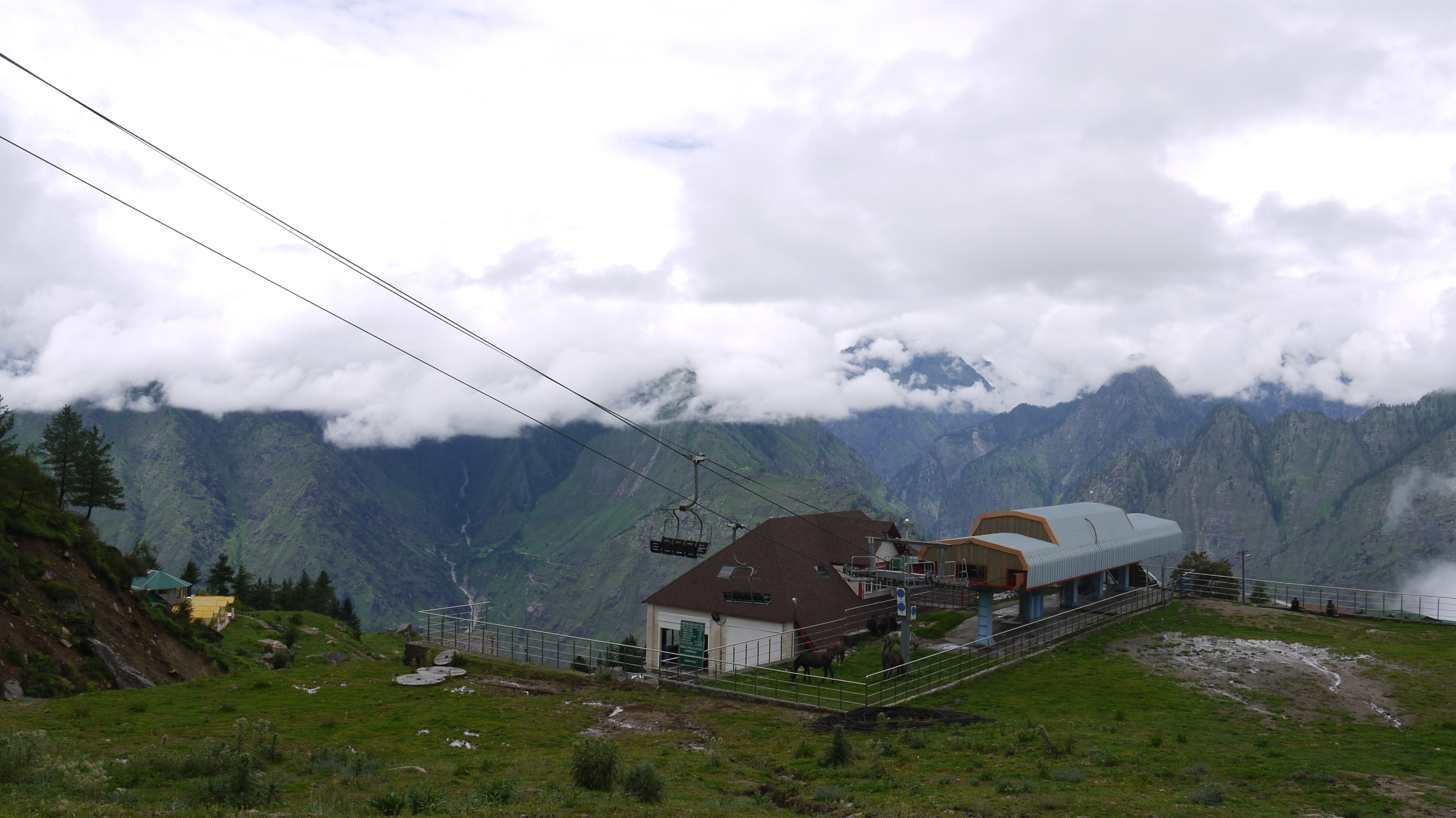
Chairlift in Auli

Skiing destinations in India are mostly in the Himalayas and are listed here by state (North-West to South-East):

Jammu and Kashmir

- Gulmarg, cable car available
- Pahalgam

Himachal Pradesh

- Manali, heli-skiing offered in Hanuman Tibba, Rohtang Pass, Deo Tibba and Chanderkhani Pass.
- Kufri
- Narkanda
- Solang Valley (Ropeway available)
- Chamba
- Shoja
- Triund
- Fagu

Uttarakhand

- Auli, ropeway from Joshimath
- Munsiyari
- Dayara Bugyal, near Uttarkashi
- Mundali, in Garhwal district

Uttar Pradesh

- Ski India, DLF Mall of India (indoor)

Sikkim

- Lachung
- Yumthang

Arunachal Pradesh

- Tawang

== Skiing in Manali ==
Though Europeans were skiing on slopes of Manali for years, it was Darjeeling's Wangdi Sherpa's small skiing school at Vashisht village which started giving lessons on skiing to local residents. Simultaneously Western Himalayan Mountaineering Institute (WHMI) (now ABVIMAS) started its courses in skiing and mountaineering in 1961. Winter Sports Club of Manali was founded by some local skiing enthusiasts in 1978 which instilled spirit of skiing in other youths of the region. In 1984, Winter Games Federation of India (WGFI) was formed by a group of visionaries and adventure loving individuals. When Solang ski slopes were not developed, competitions were organized at Rohtang pass in summer months. The Manali valley was proposed as the site of India's first international destination ski resort, the Himalayan Ski Village, but this was shelved in the 2010s after facing considerable local opposition.

== Indian skiers ==
- Jeremy Bujakowski was the first Indian at the Winter Olympics, and represented India in skiing in the 1964 and 1968 Winter Olympics.
- Aanchal Thakur won bronze in the Alpine Ejder 3200 Cup organised by the Federation Internationale de Ski. This was India's first international medal in skiing.
- Arif Khan represented the country in the 2022 Beijing Winter Olympics and has qualified for the 2026 Olympics as well. He is the first Indian to secure qualification in two events of the same edition of the Games.

== Skiing institute in India ==
There are many institutes in India conducting vocational courses in Skiing. Some major institutes are,

- Jawahar Institute of Mountaineering and Winter Sports: Basic skiing & Intermediate skiing courses.
- Nehru Institute of Mountaineering
- Indian Institute of Skiing and Mountaineering

== See also ==
- Yak skiing
