= Gulmarg Golf Club =

In Kashmir, India

Gulmarg Golf Club, J&K
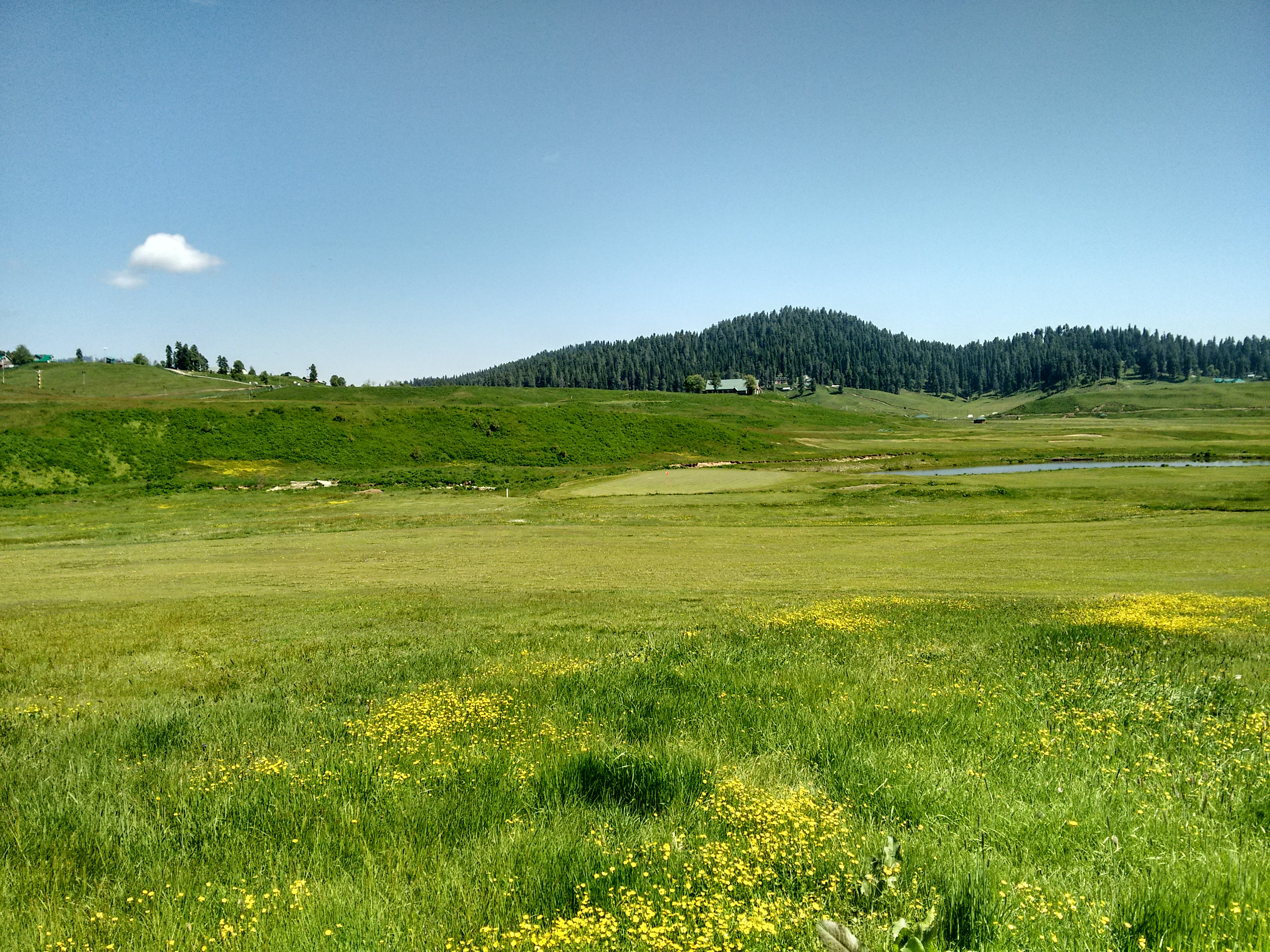
- Gulmarg Golf Course in Gulmarg, Baramulla district, Jammu and Kashmir, India
- Interactive map of Gulmarg Golf Club, J&K
- 34°03′18″N 74°23′30″E

Club information
- Location: Gulmarg, Baramulla district, Jammu and Kashmir, India
- Established: 1890
- Type: Public
- Owner: JKTDC
- Operator: JKTDC
- Tota holes: 18
- Designed by: Colonel Neville Chamberlain
- Par: 72
- Length: 7,505 yards (6,863 m)

The Gulmarg Golf Club is a public golf course in a meadow at Gulmarg in Baramulla district, Jammu and Kashmir, India. It lies 35 km from Baramulla city. The golf course, at an elevation of 2,650 metres (8,690 ft) above sea level, is the second highest green golf course in the world. It lies 52 kilometres (32 mi) from Srinagar in the west. The golf course gets covered in by a thick layer of snow during the winter. It is open from April to November.

== History ==
Gulmarg, which means the meadow of flowers, is a hill station surrounded by pine and fir. The Gulmarg Golf Course with a 6-hole course was built within a meadow by Colonel Neville Chamberlain in 1890 at Gulmarg, a hill station near Srinagar. In 1922 the first Golf championship was played at the course with the introduction of Nedou's Cup in 1929. The course was later redesigned and turned into the Gulmarg Golf Club by Peter Thomson in 1970. It was developed in a links-style in accordance with its surrounding natural landscape and made more challenging by relocation of the greens. The golf course hosted the Northern India Cup regularly until 1989, when it was shifted to Delhi. In 2011, the golf course was redesigned by Ranjit Nanda a Delhi-based golf-architect. From December to March, the golf course becomes a winter sports center for skiing and snowboarding.

== Legacy ==
The Gulmarg Golf Club, at an elevation of 2,650 metres (8,690 ft) above sea level, is the second highest green golf course in the world. It has 16 different species of wildflowers along with the creeping bent on the greens. The 18-hole golf course features the country's longest hole (the 8th, a 610-yard par 5). At 7,505 yards (6,863 m), the Gulmarg Golf Course is the longest golf course in India.

== See also ==
- Royal Springs Golf Course, Srinagar
