= High Altitude Research Laboratory =

Research laboratory

- Company type: Astrophysics and Nuclear research
- Founded: 1954
- Headquarters: Jammu & Kashmir, India

High Altitude Research Laboratory (HARL) is a research laboratory located at Gulmarg, India.

== History ==
The laboratory was established in 1954, jointly by Aligarh Muslim University and University of Jammu and Kashmir to conduct scientific research in the field of ionospheric studies, cosmic ray astrophysics, radio astronomy, geomagnetism, and atmospheric neutron monitoring. It was formally opened on 4 April 1954.

In 1963, the laboratory became a constituent part of Bhabha Atomic Research Centre and it is managed by BARC's Astrophysical Sciences Division (ASD).

In 1974, to assist HARL in executing different research projects in the field of nuclear physics and radiation physics, Nuclear Research Laboratory was set up in Srinagar.

== Research & development ==
=== Gulmarg observatory ===
Since 1977, the Gulmarg Observatory is in operation. It was established to study the geomagnetic field near the center of the ionospheric Sq current system to fill a gap in the chain of magnetic observatories between India and the erstwhile Soviet Union.
