= Coleophora aphrocrossa =

Scientific classification
- Kingdom: Animalia
- Phylum: Arthropoda
- Class: Insecta
- Order: Lepidoptera
- Family: Coleophoridae
- Genus: Coleophora
- Species: C. aphrocrossa

Binomial name
- Coleophora aphrocrossa Meyrick, 1933

Species of moth

Coleophora aphrocrossa is a moth of the family Coleophoridae. It is found in Gulmarg, in western Jammu and Kashmir, India.

The wingspan is about 12 mm.
