= Faheem Masood Shah =

Indian international ice stock sport athlete

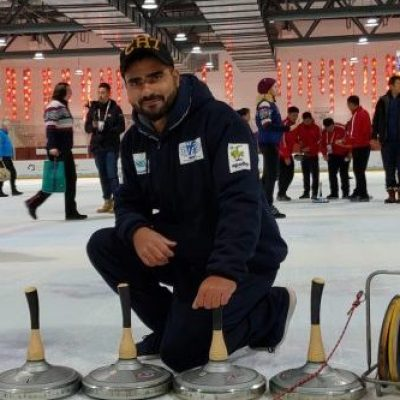
- Born: 1992 (age 33–34); Srinagar, Jammu and Kashmir, India
- Style: Right Hand

Faheem Masood Shah (born 1992) is an Indian international ice stock sport athlete. Faheem has a right hand style. He has represented India at an international level. His journey from Batamaloo, Srinagar to international icestock competitions was covered by regional media. He has also been featured across multiple Indian digital news platforms highlighting his continued participation in national and international ice stock sport competitions. In 2018 he represented India in Austria and attained 10th rank.

Faheem is a computer engineer by profession, who has emphasised the importance of balancing academics alongside sports, advocating that education and competitive athletics can be pursued in parallel without sacrificing either. Shah holds an M.Tech in Artificial Intelligence and Data Science and has also worked as a certified Google UX Designer, reflecting a combination of technical expertise alongside his sporting career.

== Early life ==
Faheem Masood Shah was born in Batamaloo, Srinagar, Jammu and Kashmir. He was introduced to icestock sport during winter sporting activities in Gulmarg, which later shaped his international career.

He initially excelled in sports such as football, cricket, and rugby before transitioning to icestock sport.

== Career and achievements ==
Faheem Masood Shah has represented India in over 175 international matches in icestock sport, making him one of the most consistent Indian athletes in the discipline. He has also competed in countries including Austria and Germany, participating in international icestock sport events. He competed at the World Championship held in Austria (Kapfenberg and Stanz) from 2–9 March 2025, where the Indian team secured a bronze medal in the Team Long Distance event and finished fourth overall. During the same championship, India achieved a world ranking of seventh in the Team Game category.

Alongside his international appearances, Shah has continued to participate in domestic championships and training initiatives, contributing to the competitive growth and visibility of ice stock sport in India at the national level. His career has also been shaped by challenges such as limited infrastructure, lack of sponsorship, and training in extreme weather conditions.

In January 2026, Shah won two gold and two silver medals at the 12th National Icestock Championship held in Gulmarg.

== Tournament record ==
All Competition Results
Year	Event	Level	Location	Result
2014	1st National ice stock sport Championship	National	Gulmarg Jammu & Kashmir India	Gold Gold
2015	2nd National ice stock sport Championship	National	Gulmarg Jammu & Kashmir India	Gold Silver
2016	3rd National ice stock sport Championship	National	Gulmarg Jammu & Kashmir India	Gold Silver Silver
2017	4th National ice stock sport Championship	National	Gulmarg Jammu & Kashmir India	Gold Gold Silver
2018	5th National ice stock sport Championship	National	Gulmarg Jammu & Kashmir India	Gold Silver
2018	12th ice stock sport World Cup	World Championship	Austria	10th Place
2019	6th National ice stock sport Championship	National	Gulmarg Jammu & Kashmir India	Gold Gold Silver Silver Bronze
2019	International ice stock sport Cup	International	China	5th place
2020	13th ice stock sport World Championship	World Championship	Regen, Bavaria Germany	7th place
2021	7th National ice stock sport Championship	National	Gulmarg, Jammu and Kashmir India	Gold Silver
2021	Summer National ice stock sport Championship	National	SKISC, Srinagar, Jammu and Kashmir India	Gold Gold Gold Silver
2022	8th National ice stock sport Championship	National	Jammu and Kashmir India	Gold Silver
2022	14th ice stock sport World Championship	World Championship	Ritten, Italy	7th place
2023	9th National ice stock sport Championship	National	Gulmarg, Jammu and Kashmir, India	Gold Gold Gold Silver Bronze Bronze
2023	3rd Khelo India National Winter Games	National	Gulmarg, Jammu and Kashmir, India	Gold Silver Silver Bronze
2023	2nd Summer National ice stock sport Championship	National	Pune, Maharashtra, India	Gold Gold Gold Silver Silver Bronze Bronze
2024	10th National ice stock sport Championship	National	Gulmarg, Jammu and Kashmir, India	Gold Gold Gold Silver Silver
2024	3rd National ice stock sport Summer Championship	National	Srinagar, Jammu and Kashmir, India	Silver Silver
2025	11th National ice stock sport Championship	National	Gulmarg, Jammu and Kashmir, India	Gold Gold Silver Silver Bronze
2025	15th ice stock sport World Championship	World Championship	Kapfenberg & Stanz Austria	Bronze
2025	National Summer ice stock sport Tournament	National	Agra, Uttar Pradesh, India	Gold Silver
2026	12th National ice stock sport Championship	National	Gulmarg, Jammu and Kashmir, India	Gold Gold Silver Silver
