= Bandy in India =

- Country: India
- Governing body: Bandy Association of Indians
- National team(s): India

The Bandy Association of Indians governs bandy in India. Its headquarters are in Aurangabad. Bandy, a team winter sport played on ice, in which skaters use sticks to direct a ball into the opposing team's goal, is generally played in northern India, where there is snow and ice. India is one of seven countries in Asia and out of a total of 27 to be a member of Federation of International Bandy. The national federation planned to send a team to the 2011 Asian Winter Games in Astana-Almaty, but ultimately did not. In July 2023, there was an Indian visit to Moscow and Krasnogorsk, including the national junior team practicing and playing matches on an ice hockey rink with large goal cages (the Czech invention "short bandy").
