= St Mary's Church, Gulmarg =

Coordinates: 34.0536°N 74.3898°E

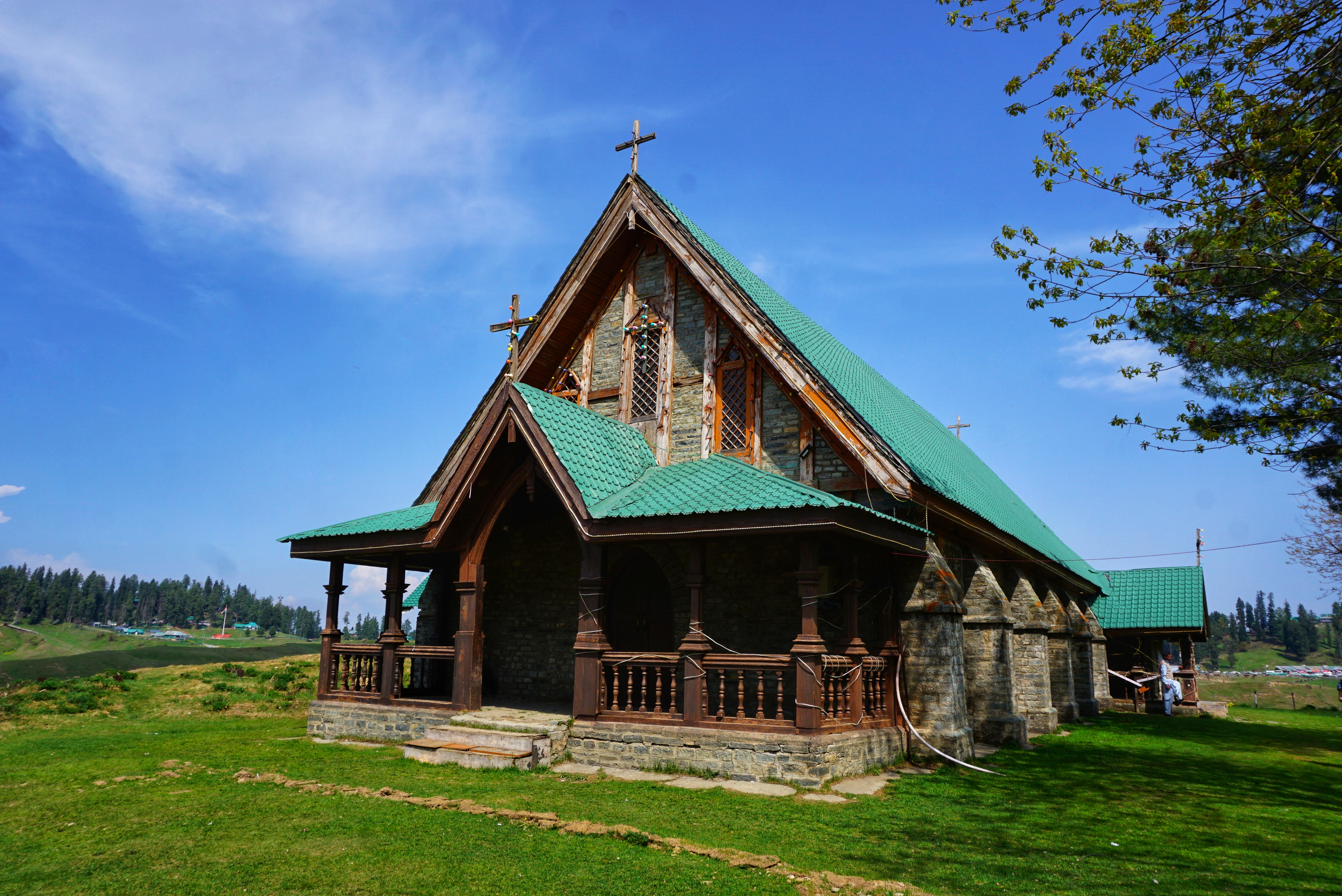
- St Mary's Church, Gulmarg
- Location: Baramulla district
- Country: India
- Denomination: Church of North India

Architecture
- Functional status: Inactive

Specifications
- Capacity: 95-100

Administration
- District: Srinagar
- Diocese: Diocese of Amritsar
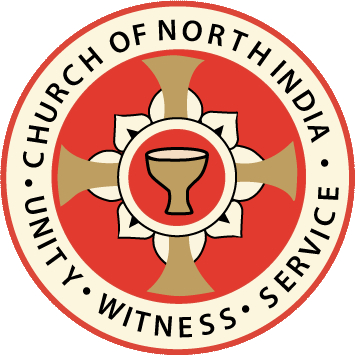

St Mary's Church is located in the Valley of Shepherds in Gulmarg and is one of the oldest churches in Jammu and Kashmir, India. It was built in 1902, during the period of British rule, and was constructed in a British style. The church is counted among the top attractions of Gulmarg.

== Architecture ==
Made of grey brick with a green roof and decorated wooden interior walls, it has been described as a "Victorian architectural wonder".

== Renovated and reconstructed ==
St Mary's was closed for years but was renovated and reopened in 2003, holding its first Christmas service for 14 years. The church belongs to the Diocese of Amritsar, Church Of North India.
