= Jammu and Kashmir Tourism Development Corporation =

Government company in Jammu & Kashmir

Jammu And Kashmir Tourism Development Corporation Limited
- Type: Government
- Industry: Tourism
- Founded: 13 February 1970; 56 years ago in Srinagar, Jammu and Kashmir, India
- Headquarters: Srinagar, India
- Area served: Jammu and Kashmir
- Products: Hotels, Restaurants, Lodging
- Owner: Government of Jammu and Kashmir
- Website: jktdc.co.in tourism.jk.gov.in

Jammu and Kashmir Tourism Development Corporation Limited (JKTDC) is a company owned by the Government of Jammu and Kashmir which is entrusted with managing government hotels and catering establishments. It was set up in 1970 and now has accommodation capacity of 2200 beds per day. The Corporation runs 37 restaurants across the state.
