= Himalayan Ski Village =

- Interactive map of Himalayan Ski Village
- Location: Kullu Valley, Himachal Pradesh, India
- Nearest city: Manali
- Coordinates: 32.27725666665802°N 77.2201343699489°E (Estimated)
- Status: Never built
- Closed: Cancelled 2018
- Owner: Himalayan Ski Village Pvt. Ltd.
- Top elevation: 14,000 ft (4,300 m)
- Base elevation: 7,500 ft (2,300 m)
- Lift system: 8 planned including a three-stage gondola
- Website: Himalayan Ski Village (archived)

Himalayan Ski Village was a proposed luxury destination ski resort envisioned to be built in the mountains above Manali, India, in the Bhrigu Lake area. First formally proposed on March 19, 2004 by a consortium led by Alfred Brush Ford and American developer John Sims, the resort would have been India's first international destination ski resort and the highest of any kind in the world, with approximately 2,000 meters of vertical drop and the top lift exceeding 4,200m in elevation. Although planned to be built in a local architectural style and to employ locals, with the consortium having gone as far as to send cohorts abroad for training, the project faced considerable local opposition on environmental and religious grounds from the start. Authorisation to start construction was granted and withdrawn again multiple times, often coinciding with changes in the ruling political party, before the memorandum of understanding was definitively canned in 2018, although it was noted at the time that the developers had already stopped pursuing the project in practice.

== See also ==
- Disney's Mineral King Ski Resort
