= Gulmarg Gondola =

Gondola lift in Gulmarg, Jammu and Kashmir, India

Coordinates: 34°02′43″N 74°23′04″E

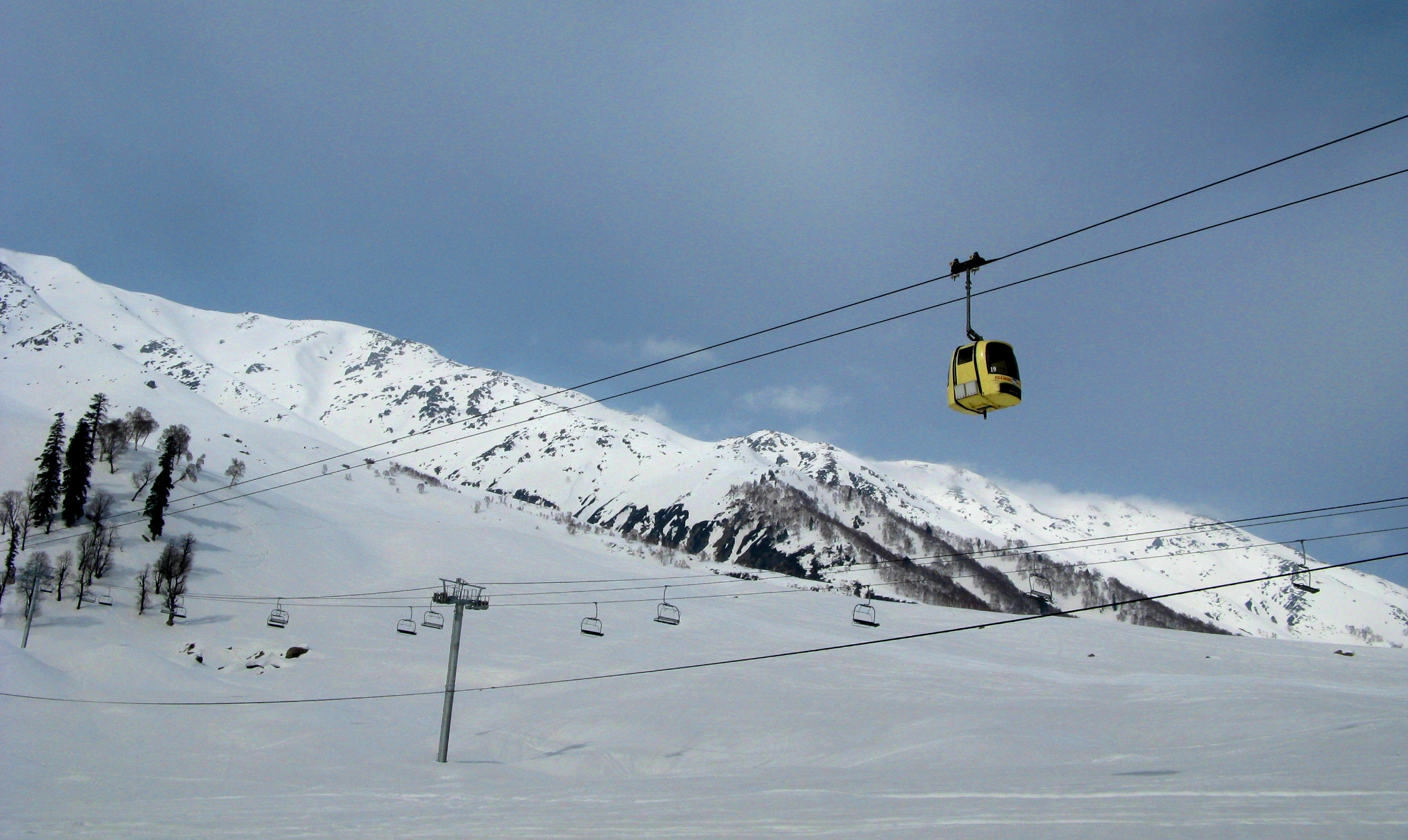
- Gulmarg cable car.

- Location within Jammu and Kashmir Location within India

Overview
- Status: Operational
- Character: Recreational
- Location: Gulmarg, Jammu and Kashmir
- Country: India
- Elevation: lowest: 2650m highest: 3950m
- No. of stations: 3
- Construction begin: 1998
- Open: 27 October 1998; 28 years ago
- Last extension: 28 May 2005; 21 years ago
- Website: www.jammukashmircablecar.com

Operation
- Operator: Jammu & Kashmir Cable Car Corporation
- Operating times: 10 a.m.–5 p.m.
- Trips daily: 24
- Headway: 30 minutes
- Trip duration: 9 minutes

Technical features
- Aerial lift type: Aerial tramway
- Manufactured by: French firm Pomagalski

Gulmarg Gondola in Gulmarg, Jammu and Kashmir, is the second longest and second highest cable car in the world. Higher lines include the Mi Teleférico in Bolivia and at Jade Dragon Snow Mountain.

== Background ==
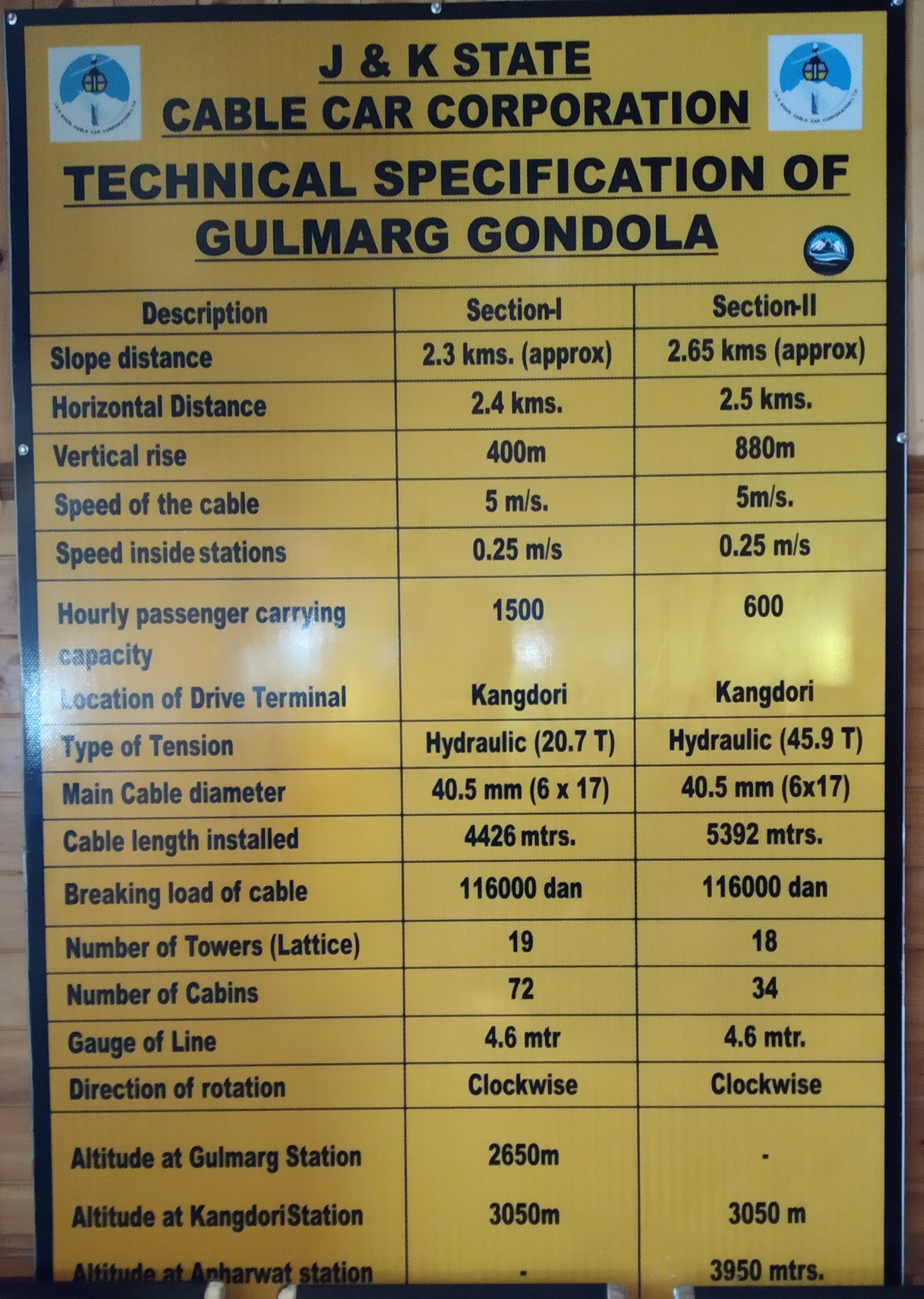
Gulmarg Gondola Specification

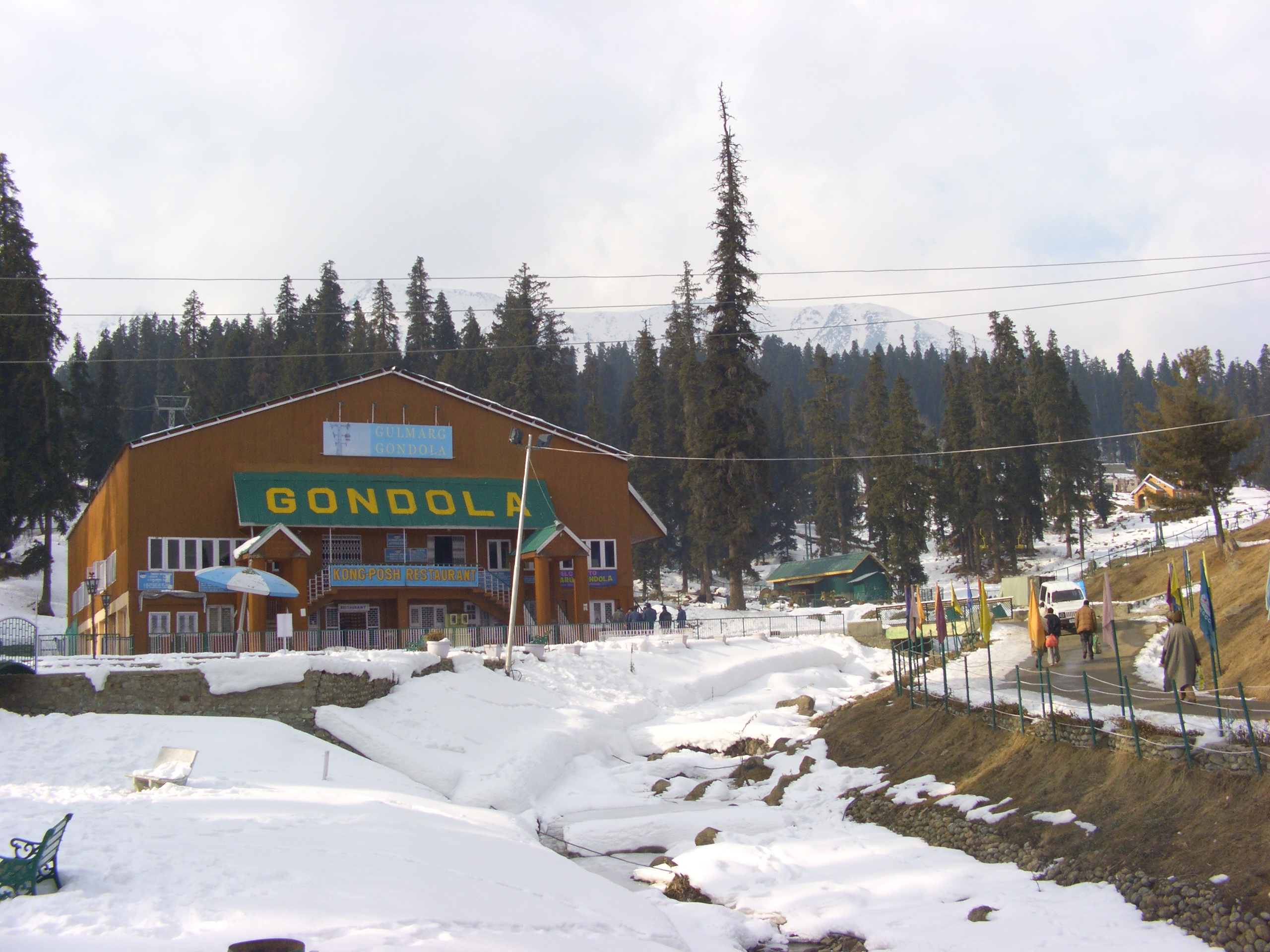
Gulmarg Gondola - The New Cable Car of Gulmarg

The two-stage gondola lift ferries about 600 people per hour to and from Kongdoori Mountain, a shoulder of nearby Apharwat Peak (4,260 m (13,976 ft)). The ropeway project is a joint venture of the Jammu and Kashmir government and French firm Pomagalski. The first stage transfers from the Gulmarg resort at 2,650 m (8,694 ft) to Kongdoori Station in the bowl-shaped Kongdori valley. The second stage of the ropeway, which has 36 cabins and 18 towers, takes skiers to a height of 3,980 m (13,058 ft) on Kongdoori Mountain, a shoulder of nearby Afarwat Peak (4,200 m (13,780 ft)). The second stage was completed in a record time of about two years at a cost of ₹18 Crore Indian Rupees (i.e. some US$4.5 million) and opened on 28 May 2005. The French company had also built the first phase of the gondola project, connecting Gulmarg to Kongdori, in 1998.

The timing of the gondola is from 10:00 to 17:00 IST(It's highly dependent upon the weather at both stages). A gondola can carry six people at a time and takes approximately 9 minutes to reach the first stage and 12 minutes for second stage.

Name	Place	Cost
Phase 1	Gulmarg to Kongdori	₹800
Phase 2	Kongdori to Apharwat	₹1000
Joy Ride	Plain ride in Kongdori	₹700

An accident occurred on 15 June 2017 due to an enormous pine tree being uprooted by a gust of wind and breaking the perspex windows on one of the gondola cabins. The gondola swung violently and its seven occupants fell 100 ft (30 m) to the ground; all were killed. Gulmarg Gondola grossed revenue of about ₹100 crore in FY 2022-2023.

== Gallery ==
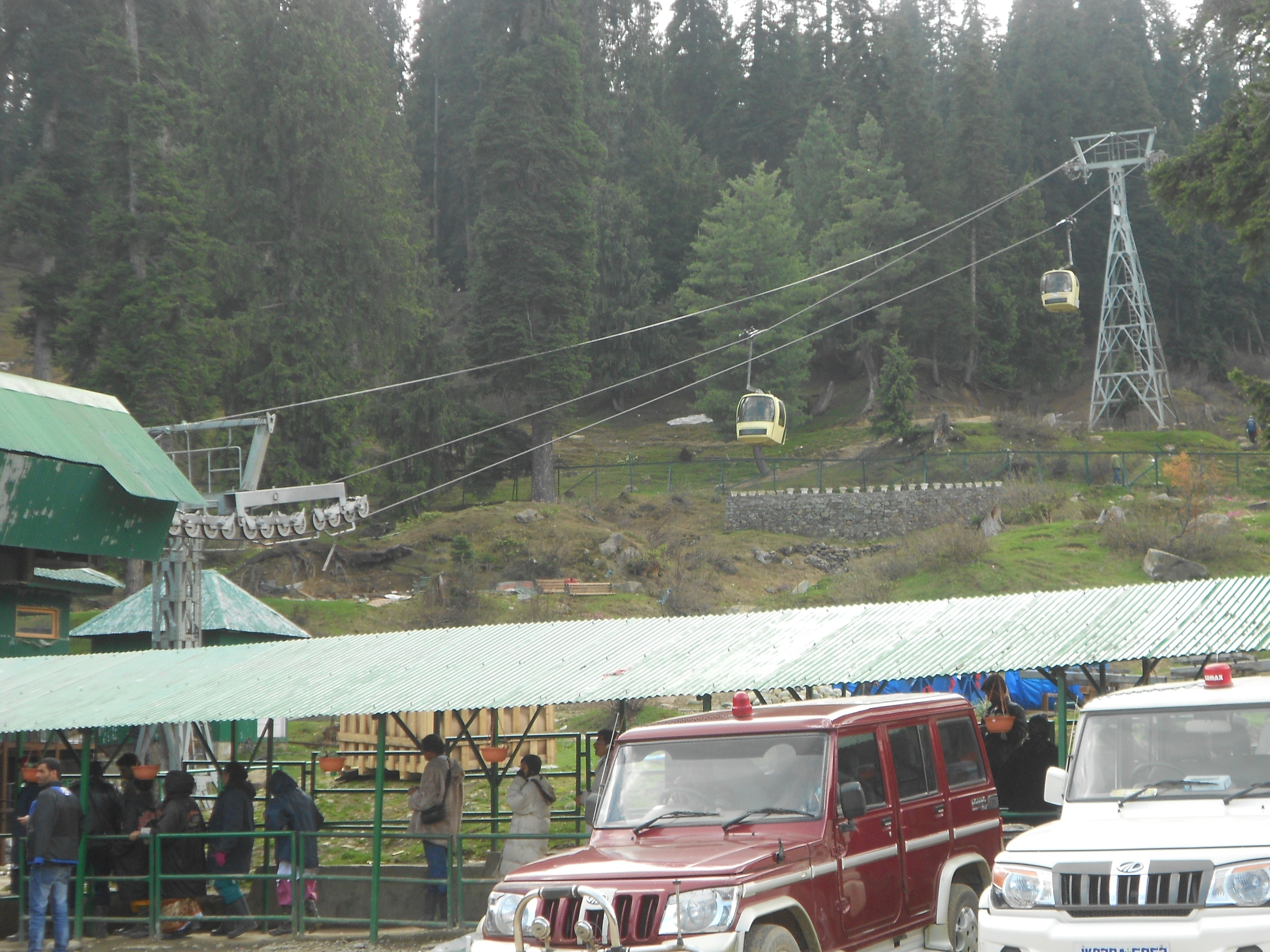
Gulmarg gondola base station in May 2013

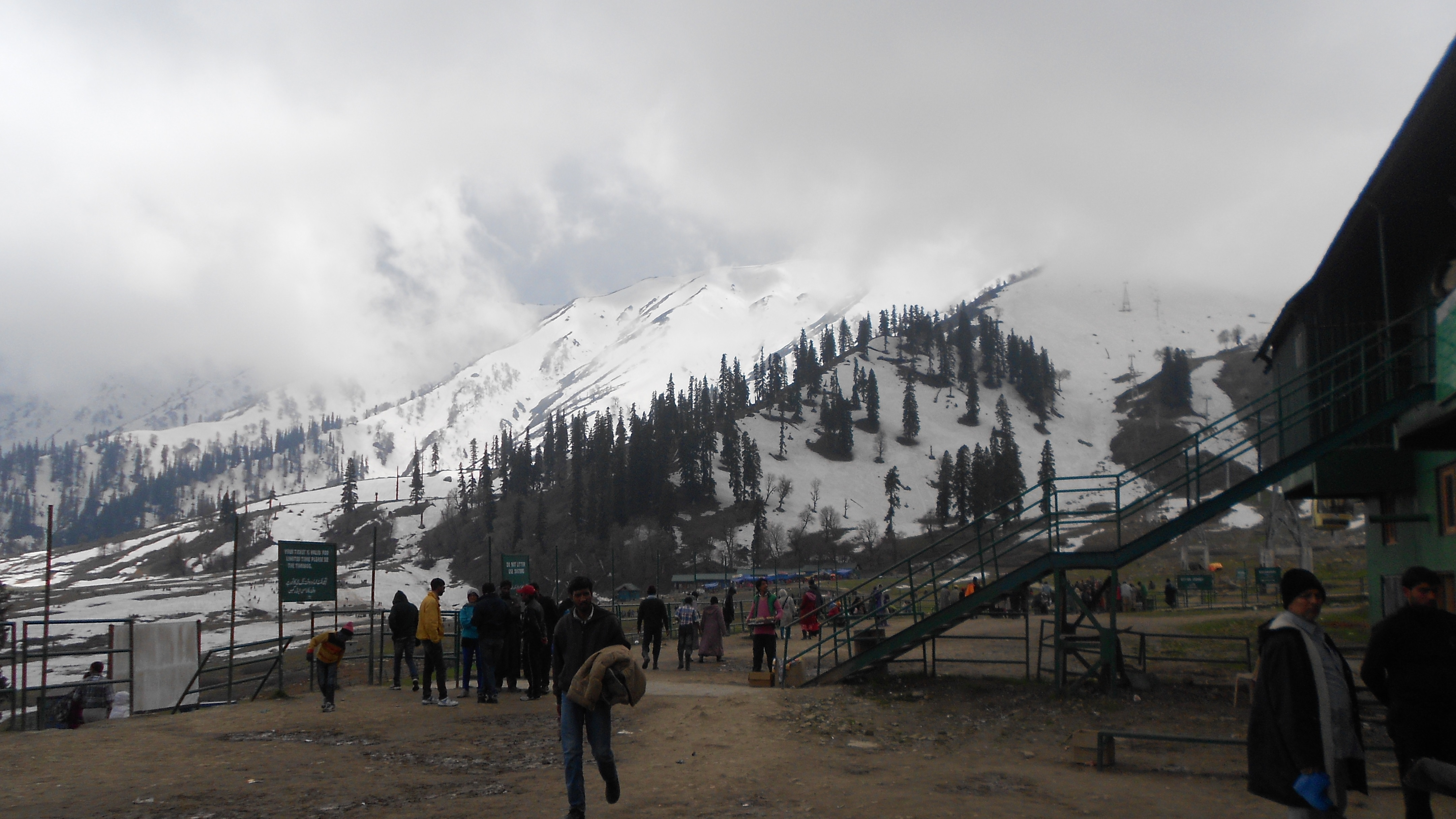
Gulmarg Kungdoor gondola station in May 2013, 2nd stage gondola and chairlift seen on right

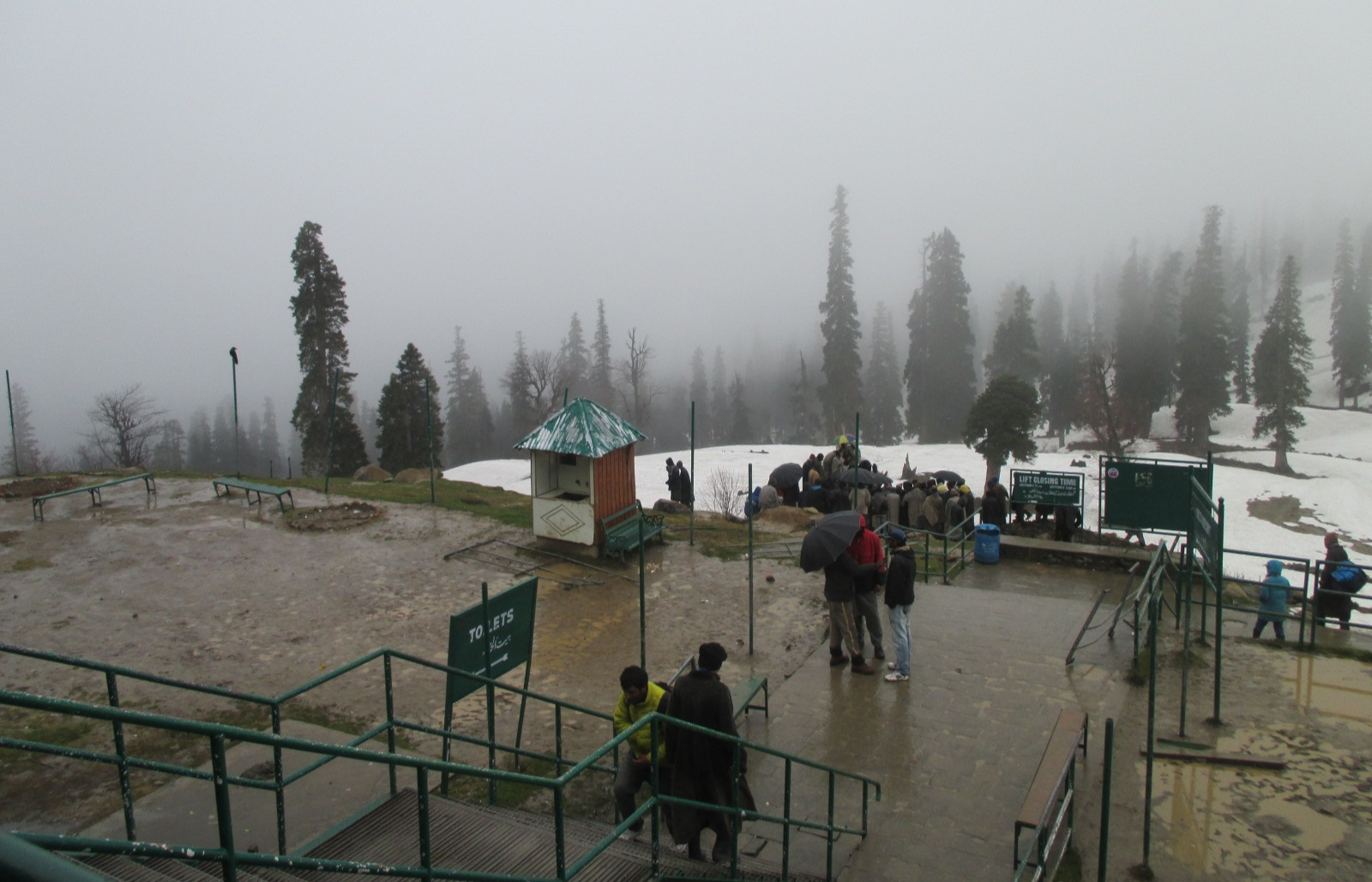
Gulmarg Gondola station in April 2013

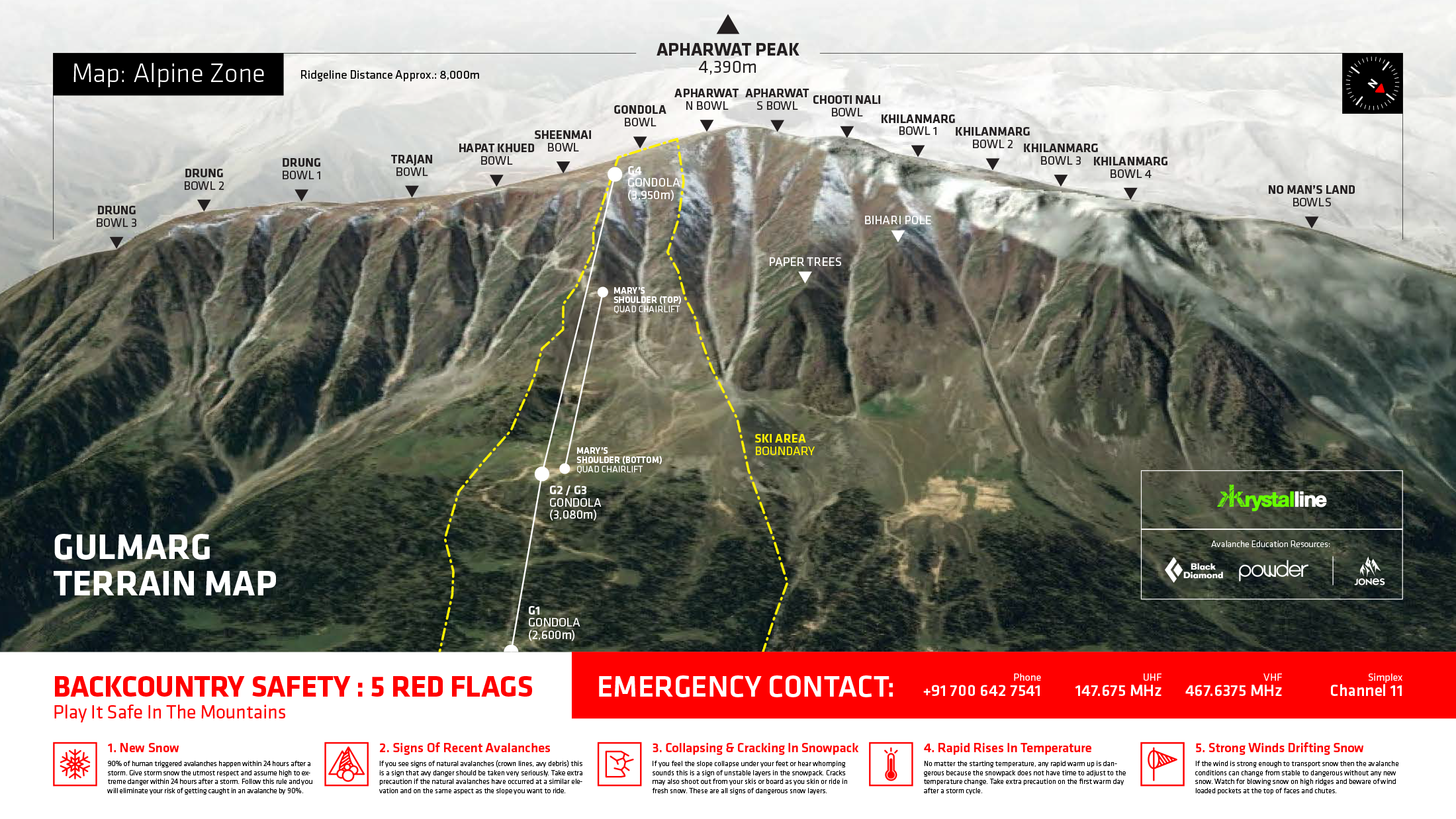
Ski Resort Terrain Map showing Gulmarg Gondola, lift, and terrain

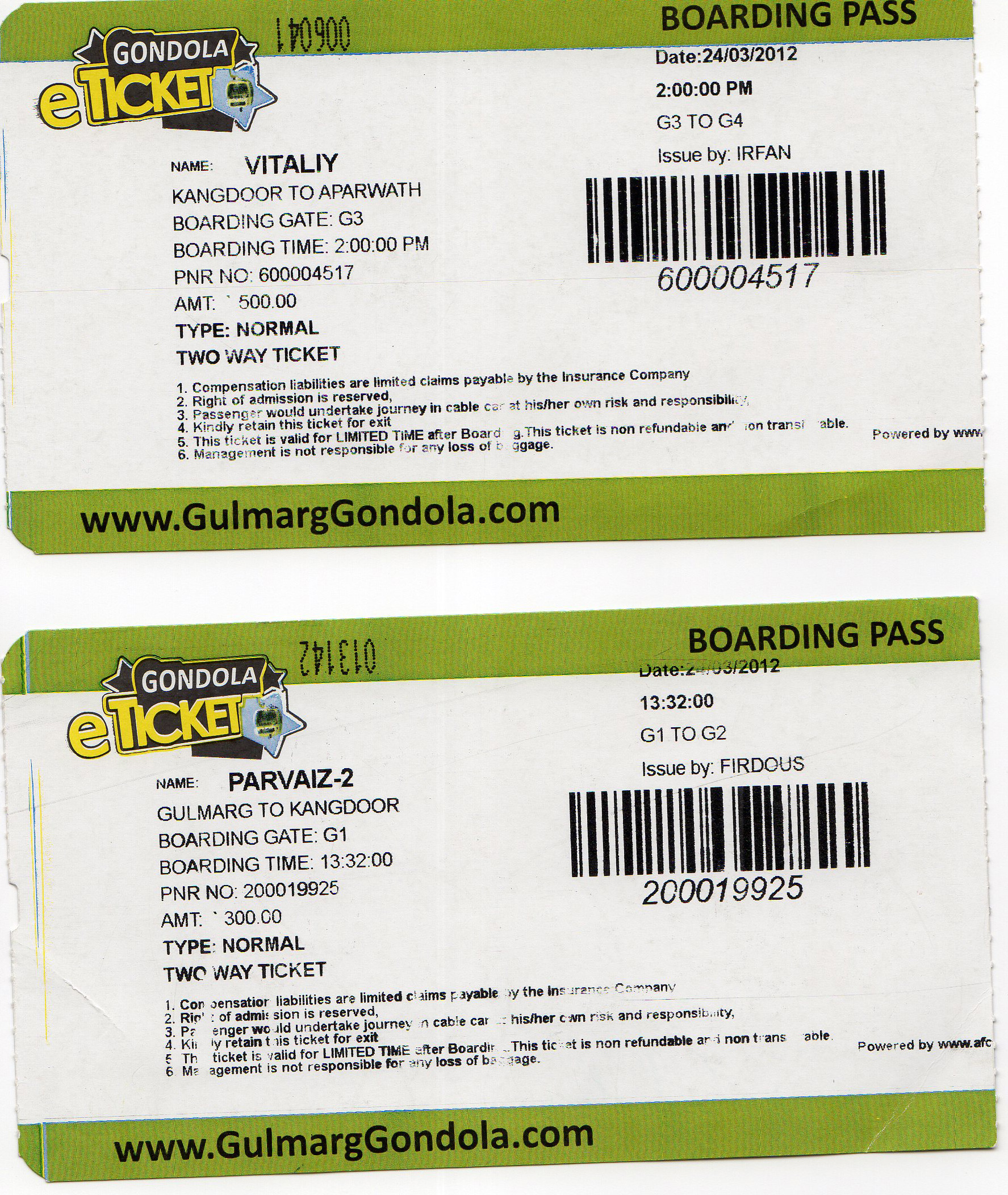
Boarding passes

== See also ==
- Aerial tramway
- List of gondola lifts
- Ropeway
- List of aerial tramways
- Cable transport
