= Apharwat Peak =

Summit in Gulmarg, India

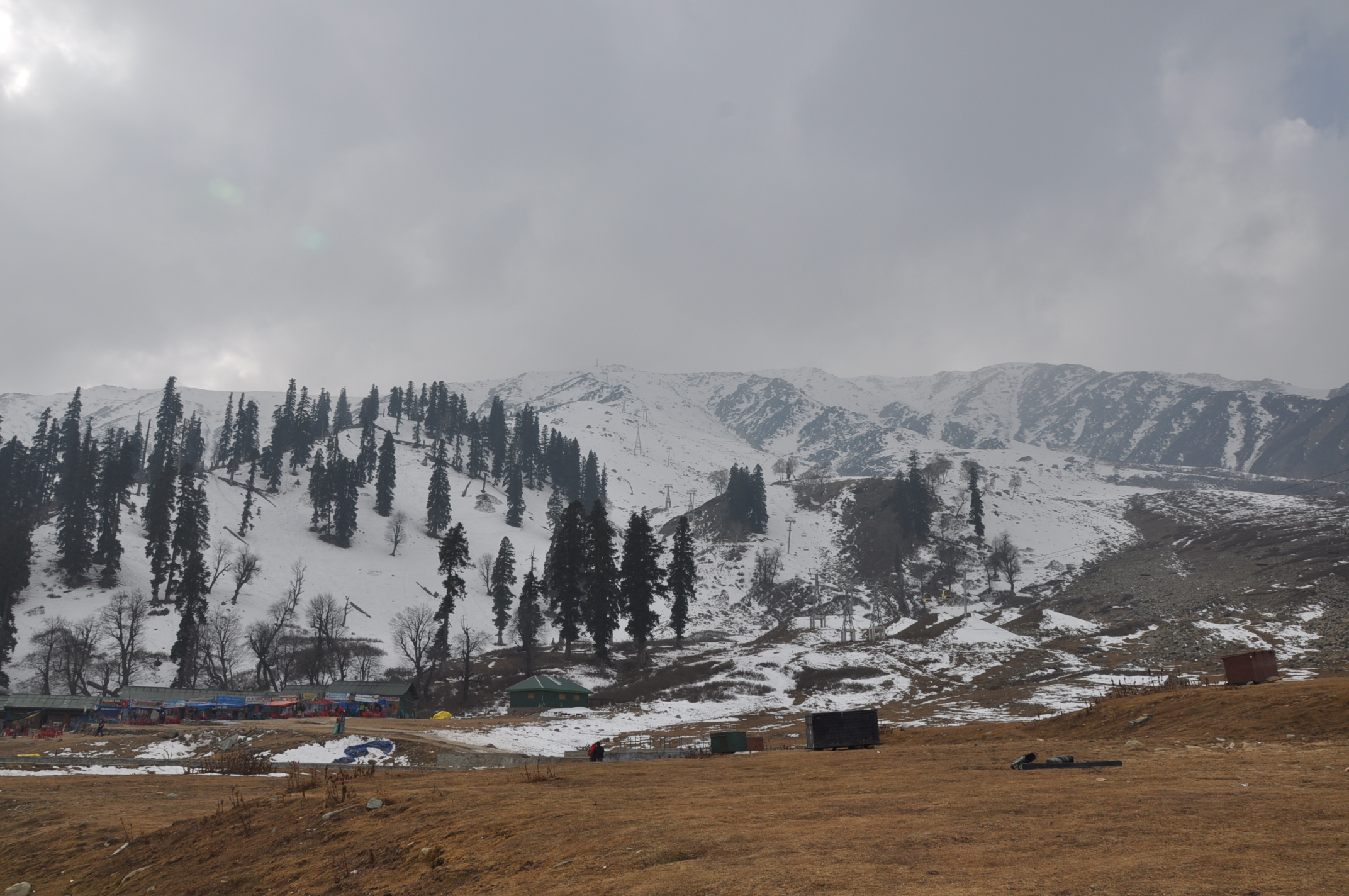
- Apharwat Peak as seen from Kongdori.

Highest point
- Elevation: 4,390 m (14,400 ft)
- Prominence: 542 m (1,778 ft)
- Coordinates: 33°59′58″N 74°19′32″E

Geography
- Location within Jammu and Kashmir
- Location: Gulmarg, Jammu and Kashmir, India
- Parent range: Pir Panjal Range

Climbing
- Easiest route: Cable car

Apharwat Peak is a summit, situated at a height of 4,390 metres (14,403 ft) above the sea level, in Gulmarg, India. It receives heavy snowfall and remains covered with snow for much of the year. The Line of Control (LOC) is barely a few kilometres away from here. Lying in the second phase of the cable car ride from Gulmarg, reaching this spot is highly dependent on the weather conditions.

Gulmarg has more than three acres of ski and snowboarding terrain. The beginner's slopes start at about 7000 feet, while more serious runs of Phase 1 are at 10,000 feet. A chairlift can take ski and snowboard enthusiasts up to 11,500 feet, while Phase 2 is the highest run at 14,000 feet.

The gondola on Apharwat Peak, one of the Asia's largest and highest cable car ringed by pine forests and snow capped Himalayan mountain peaks, takes skiers and snowboarders to the height of 3900 metres to 4100 metres on the mountain. Nearest Airport is Sheikh Ul Alam International airport Srinagar.
