= Gulmarg =

Ski-resort Hill Station in Jammu and Kashmir, India

- Hill Station
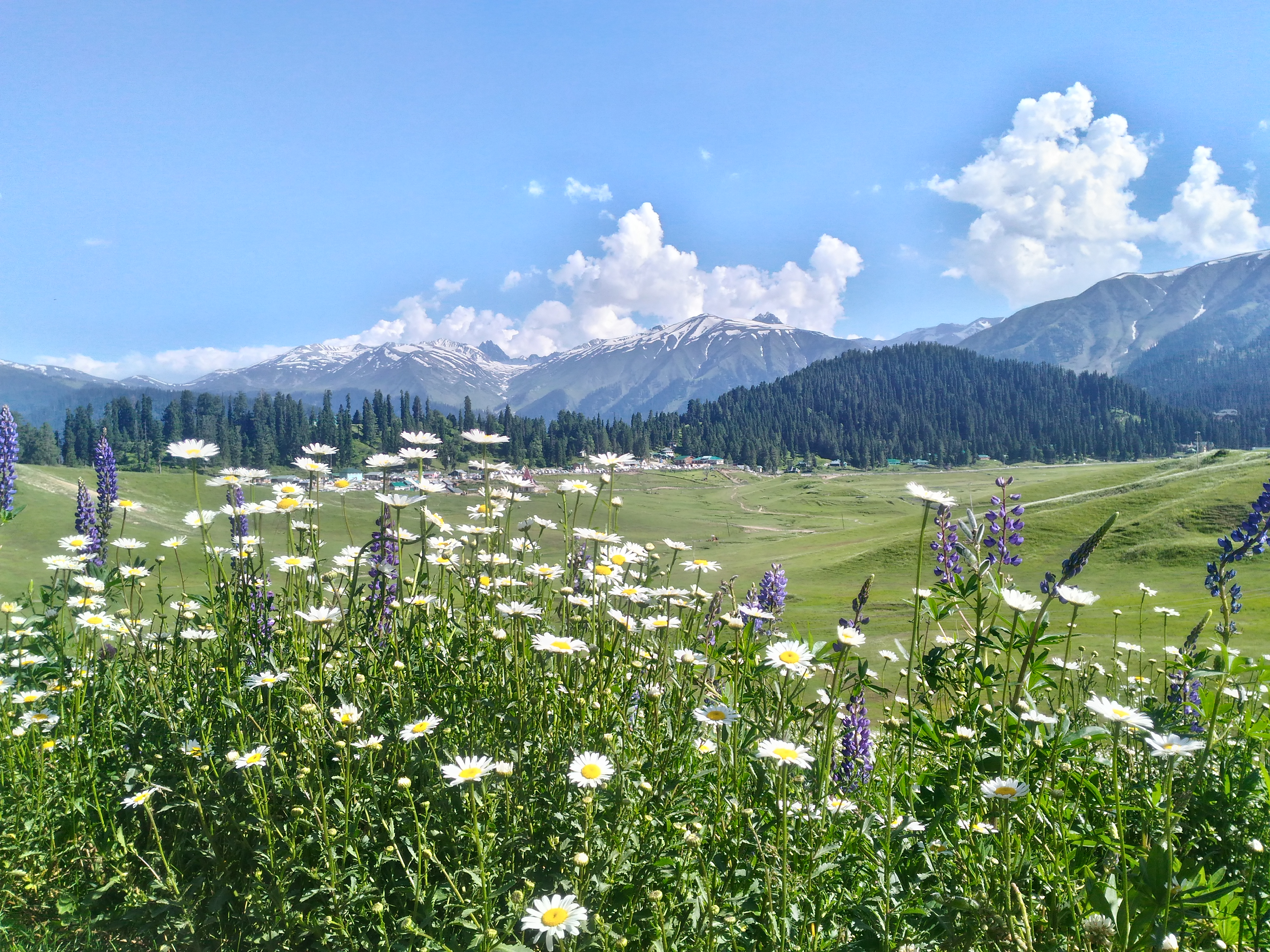
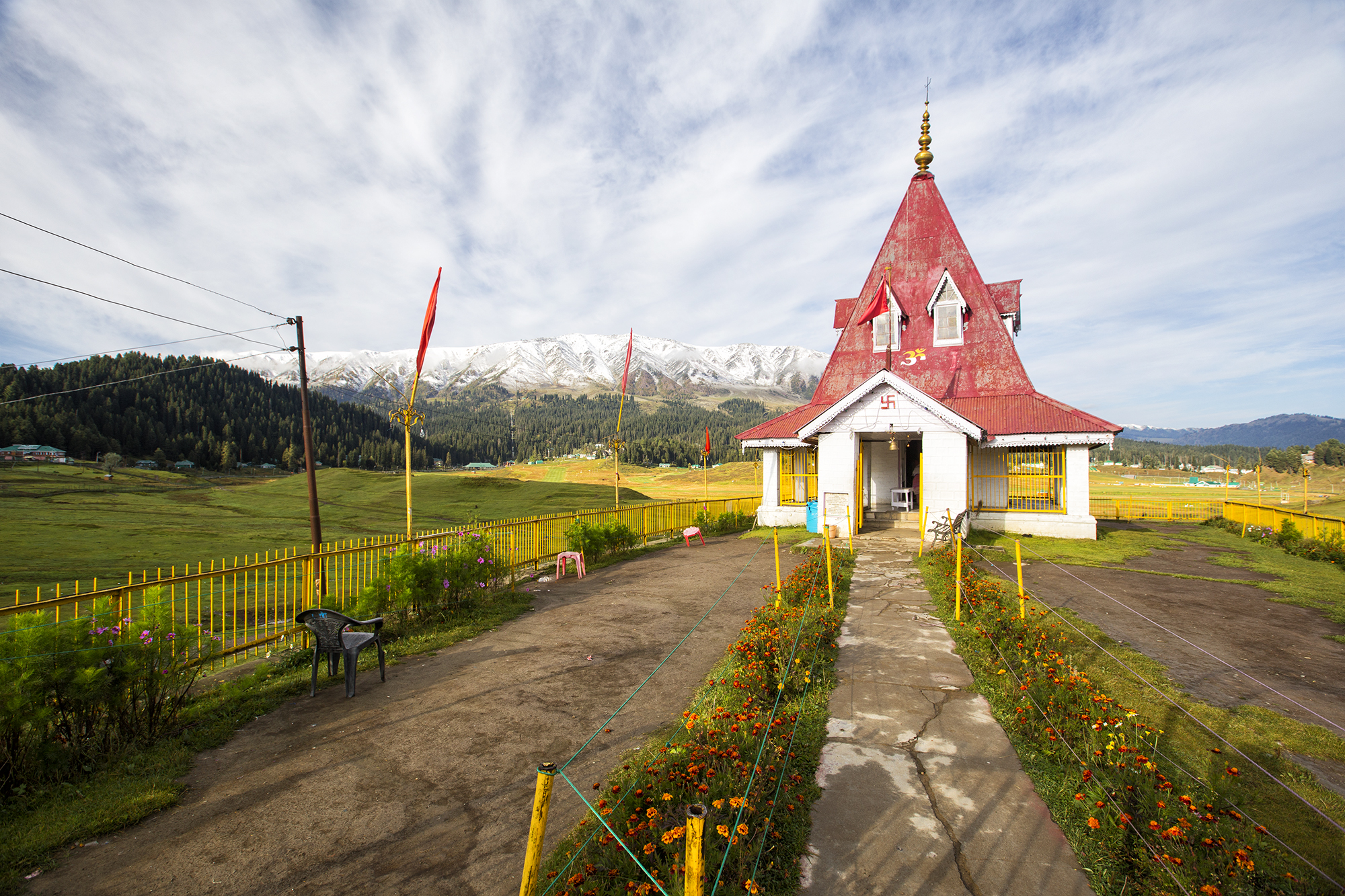
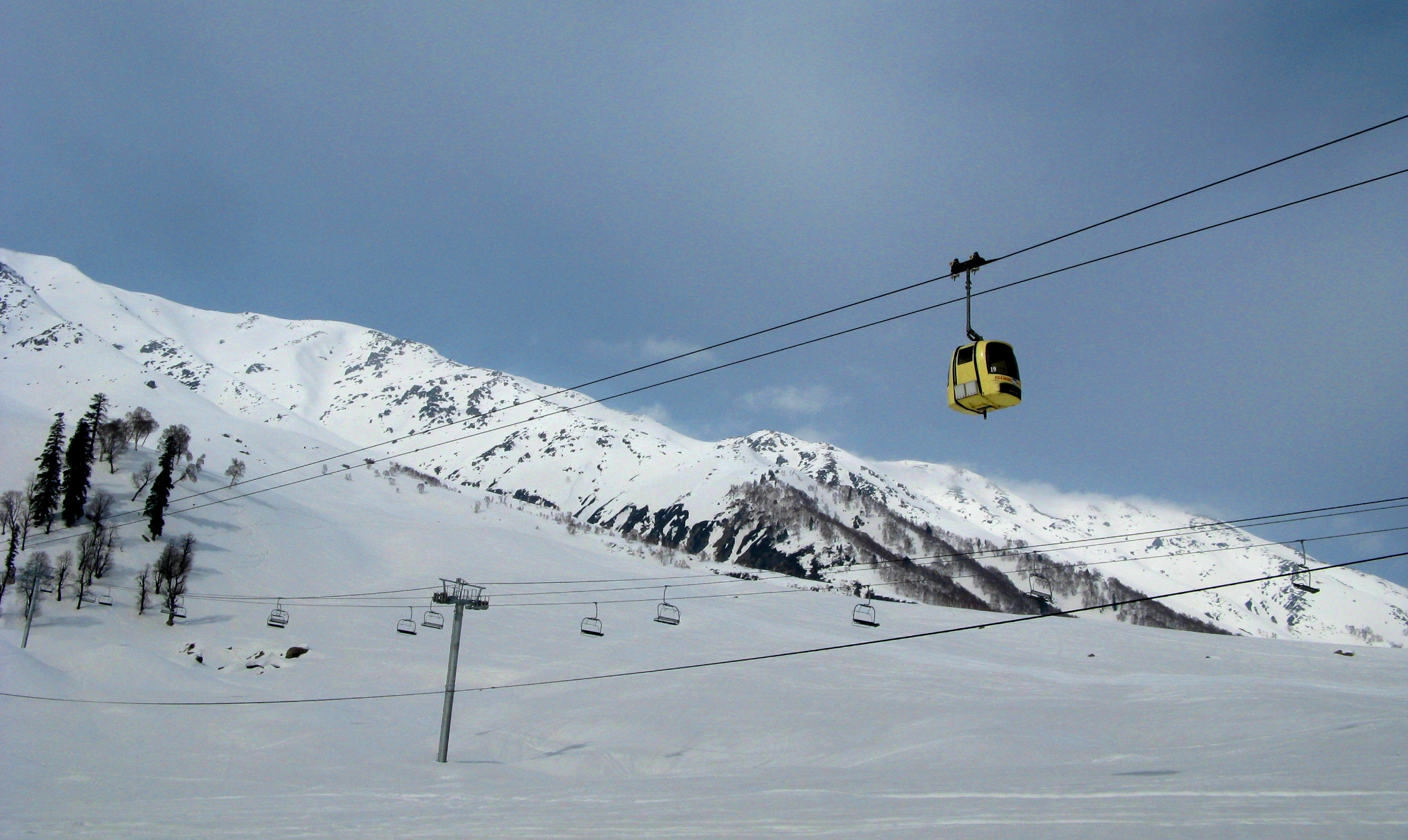
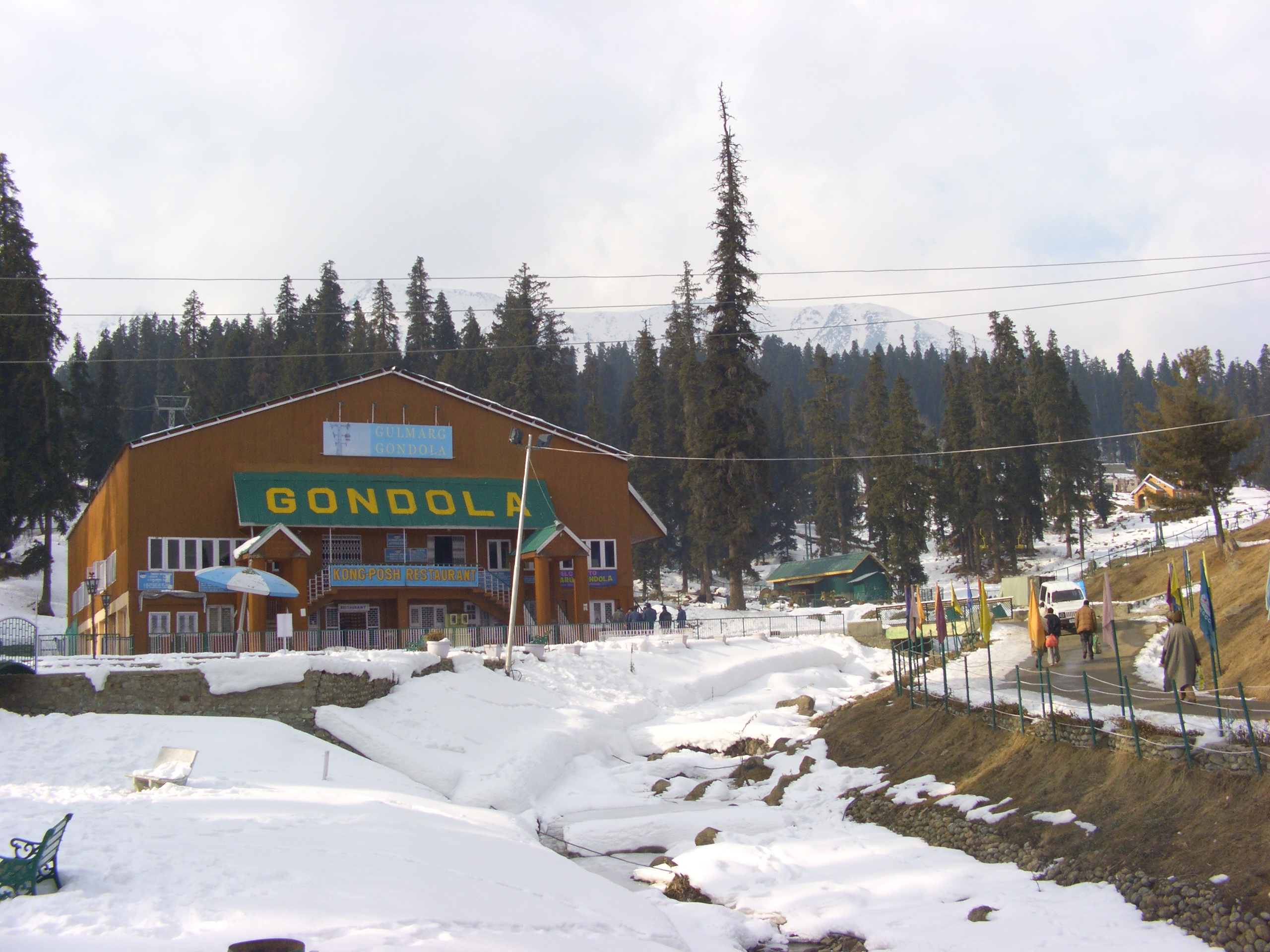
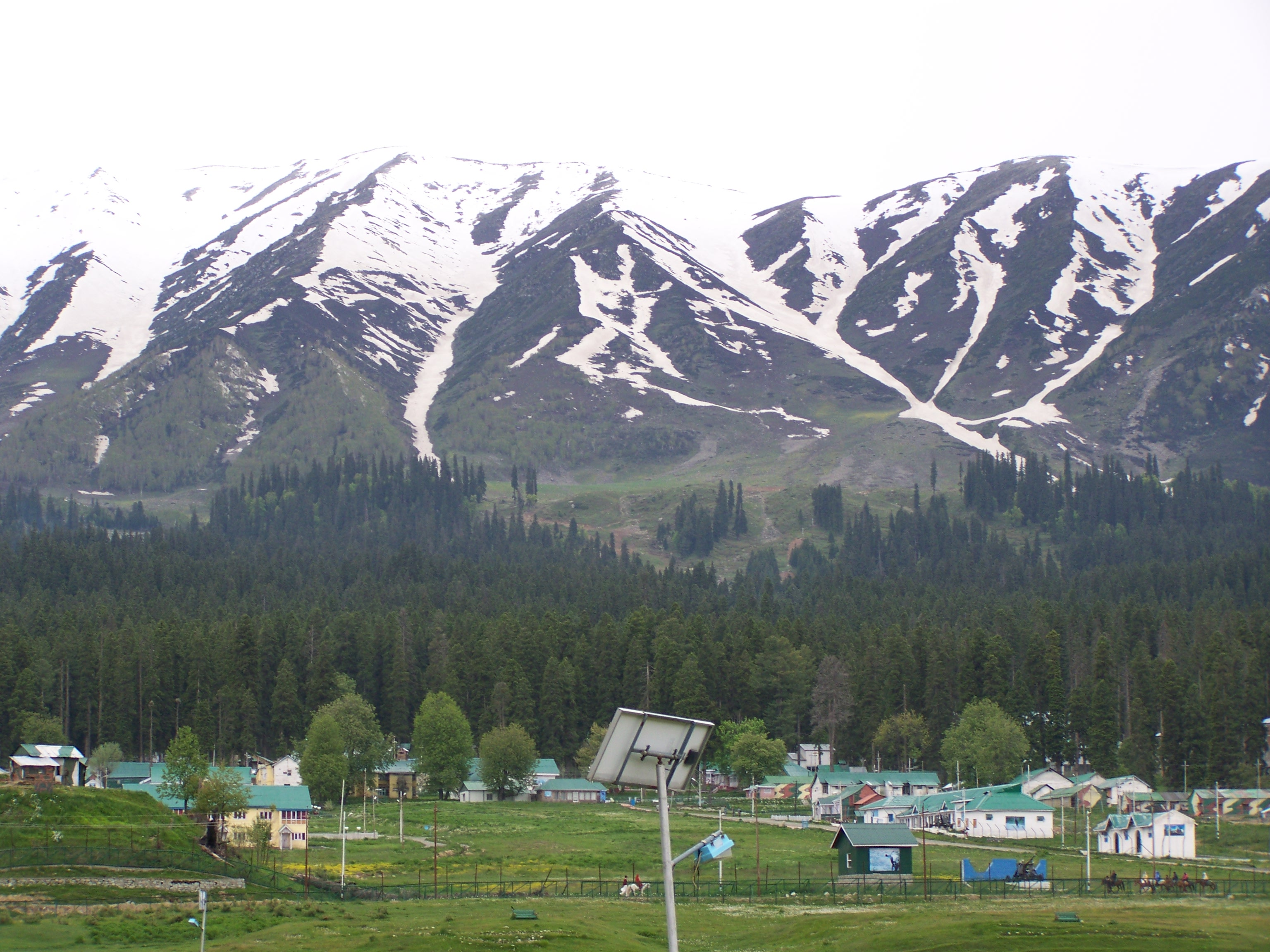
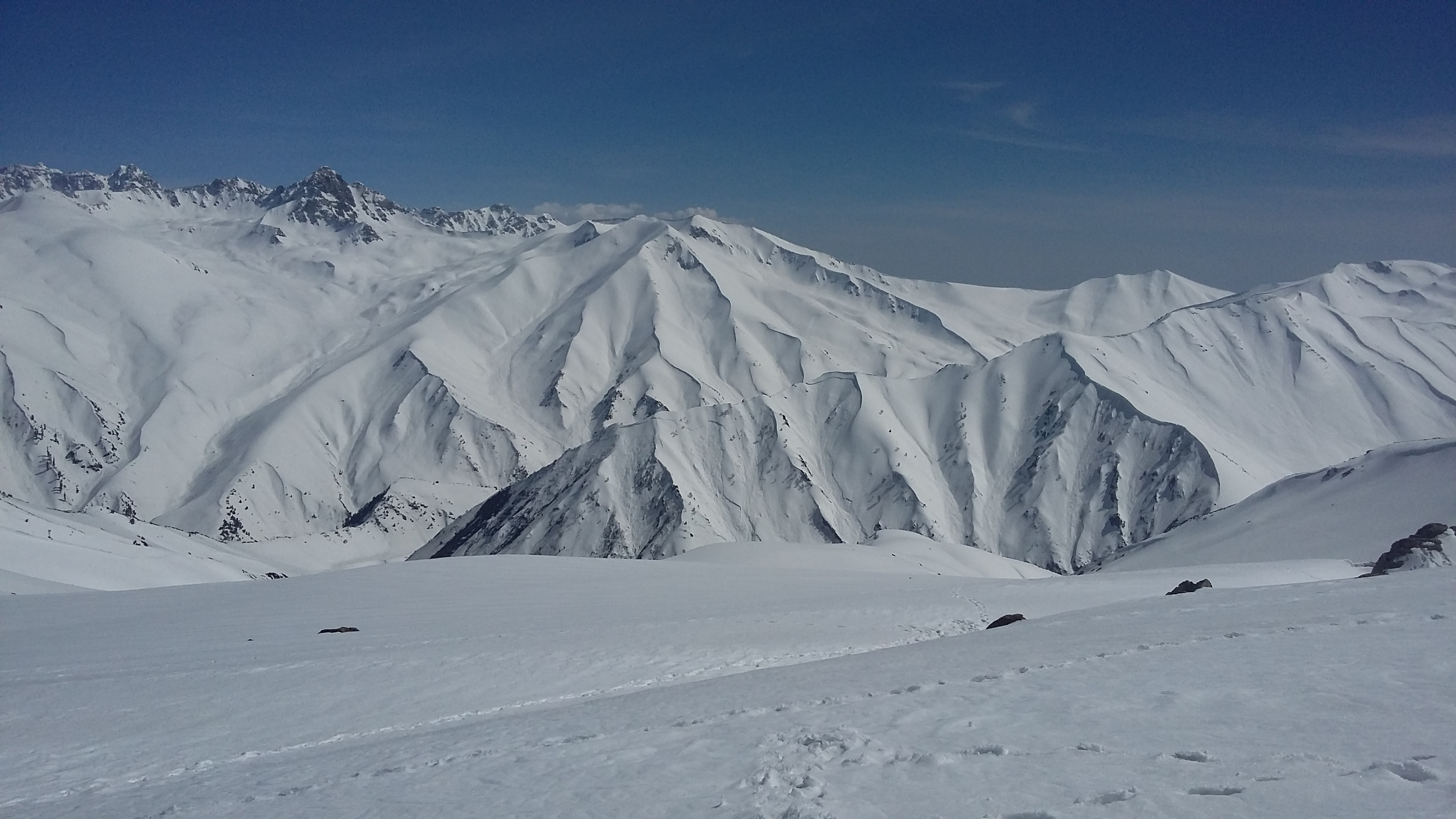
- From top left to right: Gulmarg Wildlife Sanctuary, Maharani Temple, Gulmarg Gondola, Gondola station, Gulmarg with Pir Panjal in the background, Apharwat Peak,

- Location in Jammu & Kashmir, India Gulmarg (India)
- Coordinates: 34.05°N 74.38°E
- Country: India
- Union Territory: Jammu and Kashmir
- District: Baramulla
- Elevation: 2,650 m (8,690 ft)

Population (2011)
  - Total: 1,965

Languages
  - Official: Kashmiri, Urdu, Hindi, Dogri, English
- Time zone: UTC+5:30 (IST)
- PIN: 193403
- Website: baramulla.nic.in/tourist-place/gulmarg

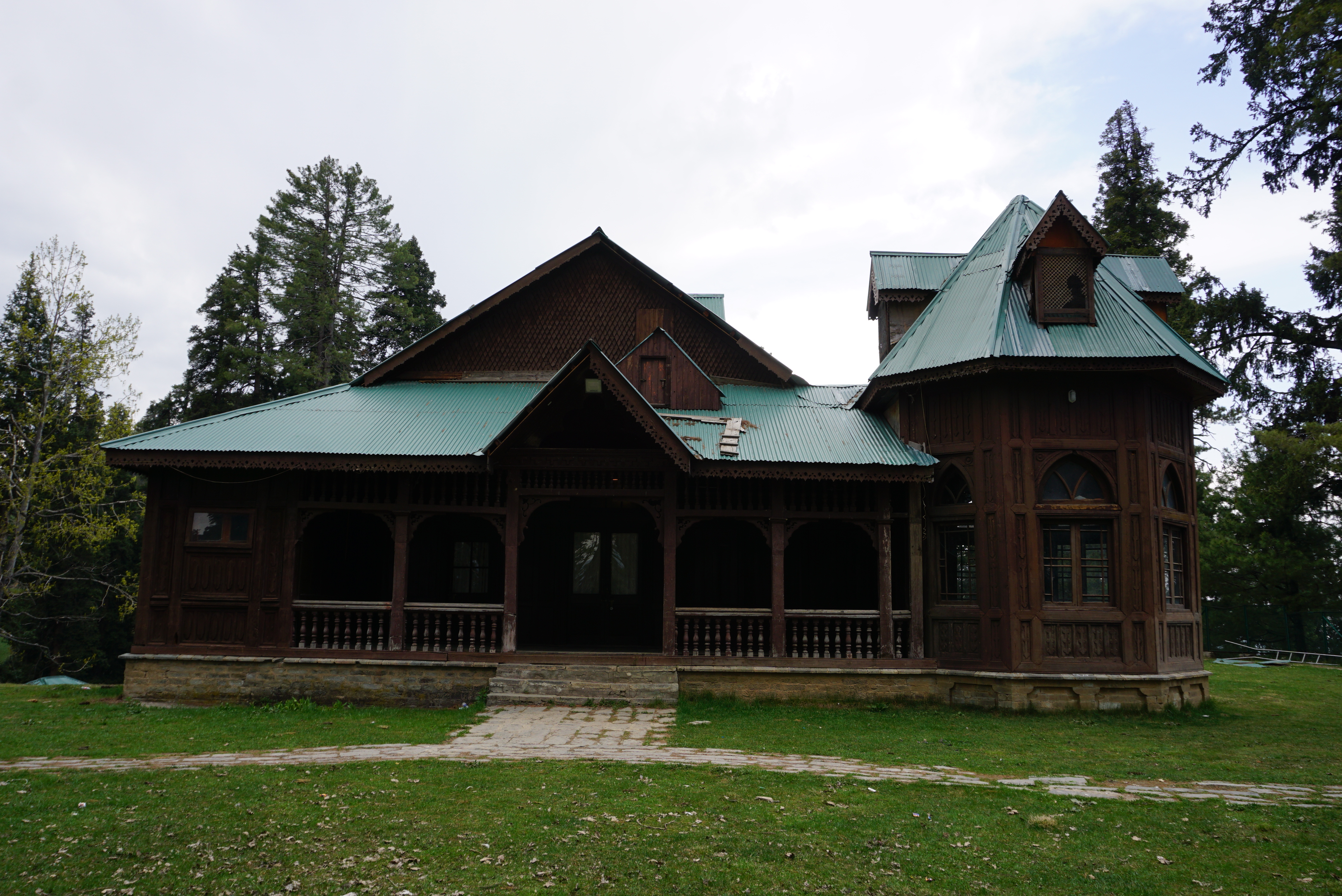
Maharaja Hari Singh Palace

Gulmarg (Note: Urdu pronunciation: [ɡʊlməɾɡ], Kashmiri pronunciation: [ɡulmarɨɡ]) (also known as Gulmarag, lit. 'meadow of flowers' in Kashmiri) is a hill station and a notified area committee in Baramulla district of the Indian union territory of Jammu and Kashmir. It is located in the Indian-administered part of Kashmir, close to the Line of Control that serves as the de facto border between India and Pakistan. It is in the Pir Panjal Range in the Western Himalayas within the boundaries of the Gulmarg Wildlife Sanctuary. Gulmarg is situated at an altitude of 2,650 m (8,690 ft), and is a popular tourist and skiing destination in the Kashmir Valley.

Known as Gaurimarg (meaning "path of goddess Gauri") to the locals, it was renamed as Gulmarg by Yousuf Shah Chak, who ruled Kashmir from 1579 to 1586. The place served as a summer and recreational retreat during the Mughal rule in the 17th century, and British Raj in the 19th and early 20th centuries. The Gulmarg ski club was established in 1927. After the end of the British rule in the Indian subcontinent, it became part of the princely state of Kashmir and Jammu, which later acceded to India in October 1947. It was briefly captured by Pakistan during the India–Pakistan war of 1947–1948, before being retaken by the Indian Army.

In 1948, the Indian Army established the High Altitude Warfare School in Gulmarg. In the 1960s, the Indian government promoted it as a tourist and winter sports destination. In the 1990s, the area was affected by insurgency, which impacted tourism, before its recovery in the 21st century. Gulmarg Gondola, which was constructed in multiple phases since the late 1990s, is a multi-stage ropeway that ferries people between Gulmarg and a shoulder of the nearby Apharwat Peak. Gulmarg has hosted the National Winter Games three times.

== History ==
Historically, the place was known to locals as Gaurimarg ("path of goddess Gauri"). Yousuf Shah Chak, who ruled Kashmir from 1579 to 1586, renamed it Gulmarg ("meadow of flowers"). During the Mughal rule, emperor Jahangir used to visit the place, and collected different varieties of wild flowering plants for his gardens. In the 19th century, during the British Raj, civil servants used the place as a summer and recreational retreat. They indulged in hunting wildlife and golfing, and three golf courses were established in Gulmarg. In 1927, the British established a ski club in Gulmarg and hosted two annual skiing events, during Christmas and Easter. Archeologist Marc Aurel Stein explored Gulmarg during the late 19th century.

After the end of British rule in the Indian subcontinent, Gulmarg became part of the independent princely state of Kashmir and Jammu, ruled by the Dogra king Hari Singh. Singh signed the instrument of accession and acceded to India in October 1947. Gulmarg was briefly captured by Pakistan during the India–Pakistan war of 1947–1948, as a part of Operation Gulmarg. The invading militia, consisting of Pathan tribesmen supported by the Pakistani army, passed through the Haji Pir pass towards Gulmarg and Srinagar. The Indian Army, led by the 1st Sikh Regiment, defended the outskirts of Srinagar. The Indian counterattacks led to the re-capture of Gulmarg and the surrounding areas. In 1948, the Indian Army established the High Altitude Warfare School in Gulmarg. On 1 January 1949, the India-Pakistan war ended under the supervision of the United Nations, and the Line of Control (named as per the Shimla Agreement of 1972), which became the de facto boundary between India and Pakistan, was established closer to the region.

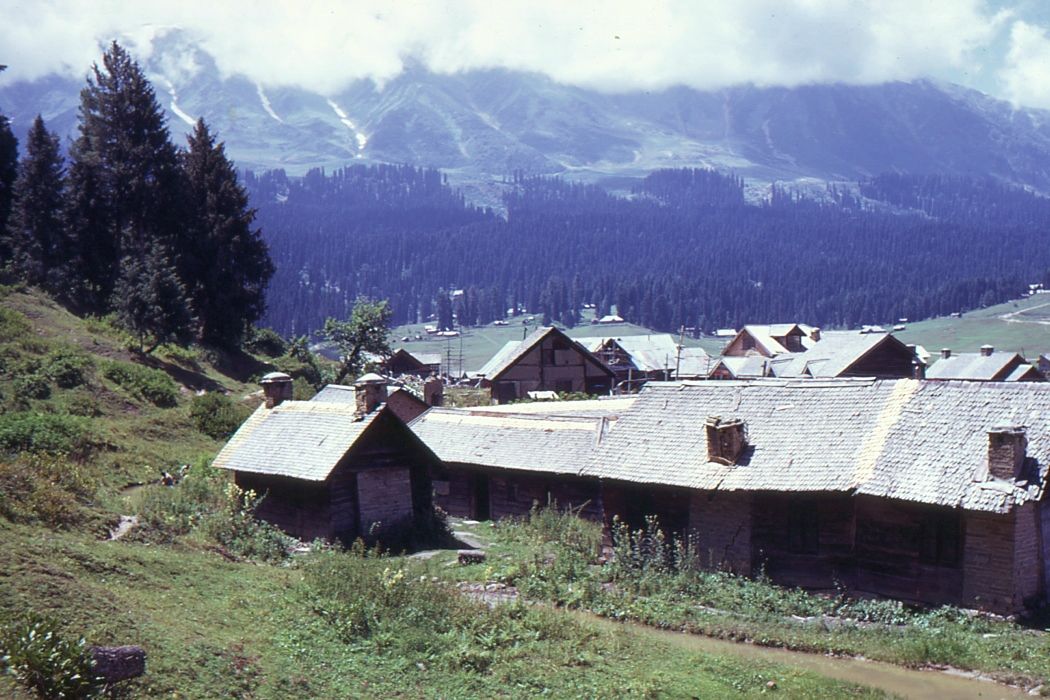
Gulmarg in 1969

After Indian Independence, the Government of India sought to develop Gulmarg as a winter sports and tourist destination. In 1960, alpine skier Rudolph Matt, who came at the invitation of the government, determined that Gulmarg was a suitable location for winter sports. In 1968, the Institute of Skiing and Mountaineering was established in Gulmarg to train skiers. The government invested ₹30 million (US$310,000) in developing skiing facilities in Gulmarg. In the mid-1980s, heli-skiing was introduced in Gulmarg. In the 1990s, the rise of insurgency in Kashmir affected tourism in Gulmarg. The industry started to recover in late 1990s, and early 2000s. The Gulmarg Gondola was opened in various stages from 1998 to 2011. In 2014, Government of Jammu and Kashmir drafted a master plan, to be implemented by 2032, for sustainable development in Gumarg.

== Geography and geology ==
Gulmarg lies in a cup-shaped valley in the Pir Panjal Range of the Himalayas, at an altitude of, 2,650 m (8,690 ft). It is located about 56 km (35 mi) from Srinagar, in Baramulla district of the Indian union territory of Jammu and Kashmir. The soil in Gulmarg comprises glacial deposits, lacustrine deposits, and moraines from Pleistocene epoch covering shales, limestones, sandstones, schists and other varieties of rocks. The natural meadows of Gulmarg, which are covered with snow in winter, allow the growth of wild flowers such as daisies, forget-me-nots and buttercups during the spring and summer. The meadows are interspersed by parks and small lakes, and are surrounded by forests of pine and fir trees. Apharwat Peak, rising to 4,267 m (13,999 ft), overlooks Gulmarg, and offers a view of Nanga Parbat and Harmukh peaks.

=== Climate ===
Due to its high elevation, Gulmarg has a warm-summer humid continental climate (Köppen: Dfb) and a wet winter season with heavy snowfall. Summers are moderate in temperature and length, with relatively cool shoulder seasons.

Climate data for Gulmarg, Jammu and Kashmir (1991–2020, extremes 1907–2020)
Month	Jan	Feb	Mar	Apr	May	Jun	Jul	Aug	Sep	Oct	Nov	Dec	Year
Record high °C (°F)	11.5 (52.7)	11.4 (52.5)	18.0 (64.4)	23.6 (74.5)	28.0 (82.4)	29.4 (84.9)	31.2 (88.2)	27.0 (80.6)	26.0 (78.8)	23.4 (74.1)	20.0 (68.0)	15.8 (60.4)	31.2 (88.2)
Mean maximum °C (°F)	6.1 (43.0)	7.1 (44.8)	11.8 (53.2)	18.0 (64.4)	21.3 (70.3)	24.7 (76.5)	25.5 (77.9)	24.2 (75.6)	22.5 (72.5)	19.4 (66.9)	14.5 (58.1)	9.8 (49.6)	26.3 (79.3)
Mean daily maximum °C (°F)	0.7 (33.3)	1.8 (35.2)	5.4 (41.7)	10.4 (50.7)	15.6 (60.1)	19.3 (66.7)	21.1 (70.0)	20.5 (68.9)	18.5 (65.3)	14.2 (57.6)	9.0 (48.2)	4.6 (40.3)	11.9 (53.4)
Daily mean °C (°F)	−3.5 (25.7)	−2.3 (27.9)	1.4 (34.5)	6.2 (43.2)	10.9 (51.6)	14.4 (57.9)	16.6 (61.9)	16.1 (61.0)	13.6 (56.5)	9.0 (48.2)	4.2 (39.6)	−0.1 (31.8)	7.4 (45.3)
Mean daily minimum °C (°F)	−7.7 (18.1)	−6.4 (20.5)	−2.7 (27.1)	1.9 (35.4)	6.1 (43.0)	9.4 (48.9)	12.0 (53.6)	11.7 (53.1)	8.6 (47.5)	3.8 (38.8)	−0.6 (30.9)	−4.8 (23.4)	2.8 (37.0)
Mean minimum °C (°F)	−12.4 (9.7)	−11.1 (12.0)	−8.4 (16.9)	−3.4 (25.9)	1.2 (34.2)	4.8 (40.6)	7.9 (46.2)	7.8 (46.0)	4.7 (40.5)	−0.4 (31.3)	−5.0 (23.0)	−8.7 (16.3)	−12.8 (9.0)
Record low °C (°F)	−27.2 (−17.0)	−31.6 (−24.9)	−14.8 (5.4)	−8.7 (16.3)	−3.2 (26.2)	−3.9 (25.0)	2.8 (37.0)	2.7 (36.9)	−2.8 (27.0)	−6.5 (20.3)	−13.4 (7.9)	−24.3 (−11.7)	−31.6 (−24.9)
Average rainfall mm (inches)	161.3 (6.35)	207.5 (8.17)	215.6 (8.49)	166.2 (6.54)	139.3 (5.48)	101.6 (4.00)	101.7 (4.00)	101.0 (3.98)	75.9 (2.99)	47.7 (1.88)	57.2 (2.25)	74.1 (2.92)	1,449.2 (57.06)
Average rainy days	8.6	10.2	11.5	11.4	10.1	8.9	8.3	8.2	5.8	3.7	3.7	4.7	95.3
Average relative humidity (%) (at 17:30 IST)	76	77	72	66	65	64	73	74	66	59	60	67	68
Source: India Meteorological Department

== Demographics ==
Religions in Gulmarg (2011)
Religion	Percent
Hinduism	86.6%
Islam	12.4%
Christianity	0.6%
Sikhism	0.4%

As per the 2011 census, Gulmarg had a population of 1,965 across 77 households. There were 1,957 males and eight females with no children below the age of six years. The average literacy rate was 99.24%. Scheduled Castes and Scheduled Tribes constituted 0.61% and 0.15% of the population respectively. The town has few permanent residents with most residents being tourists and those associated with the seasonal tourism industry.

=== Culture and religion ===
Hinduism was the major religion with 86.6% adherents, followed by Islam with 12.4% adherents. Minor population of Christians and Sikhs are also present in the town.

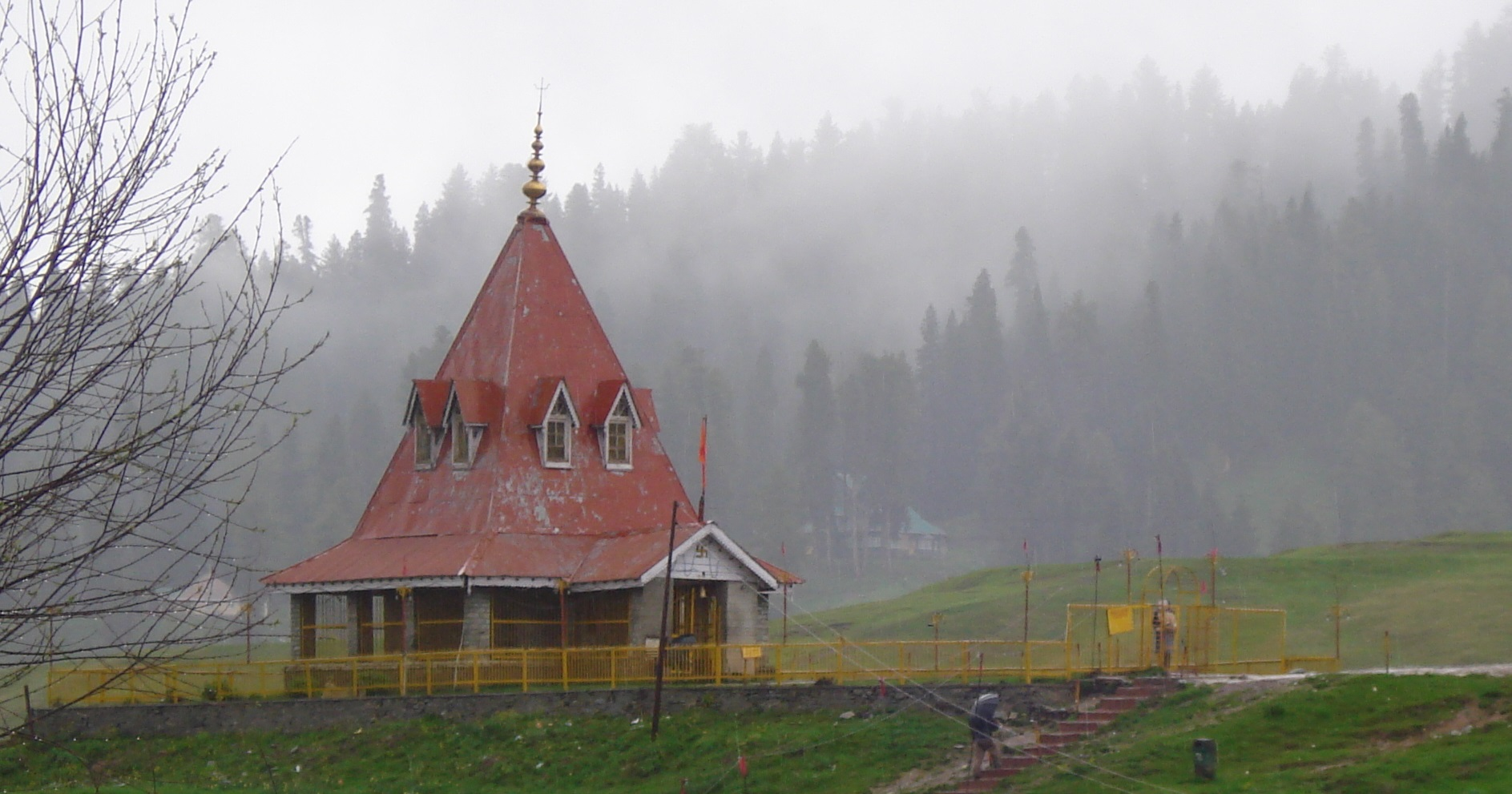
Maharani Temple

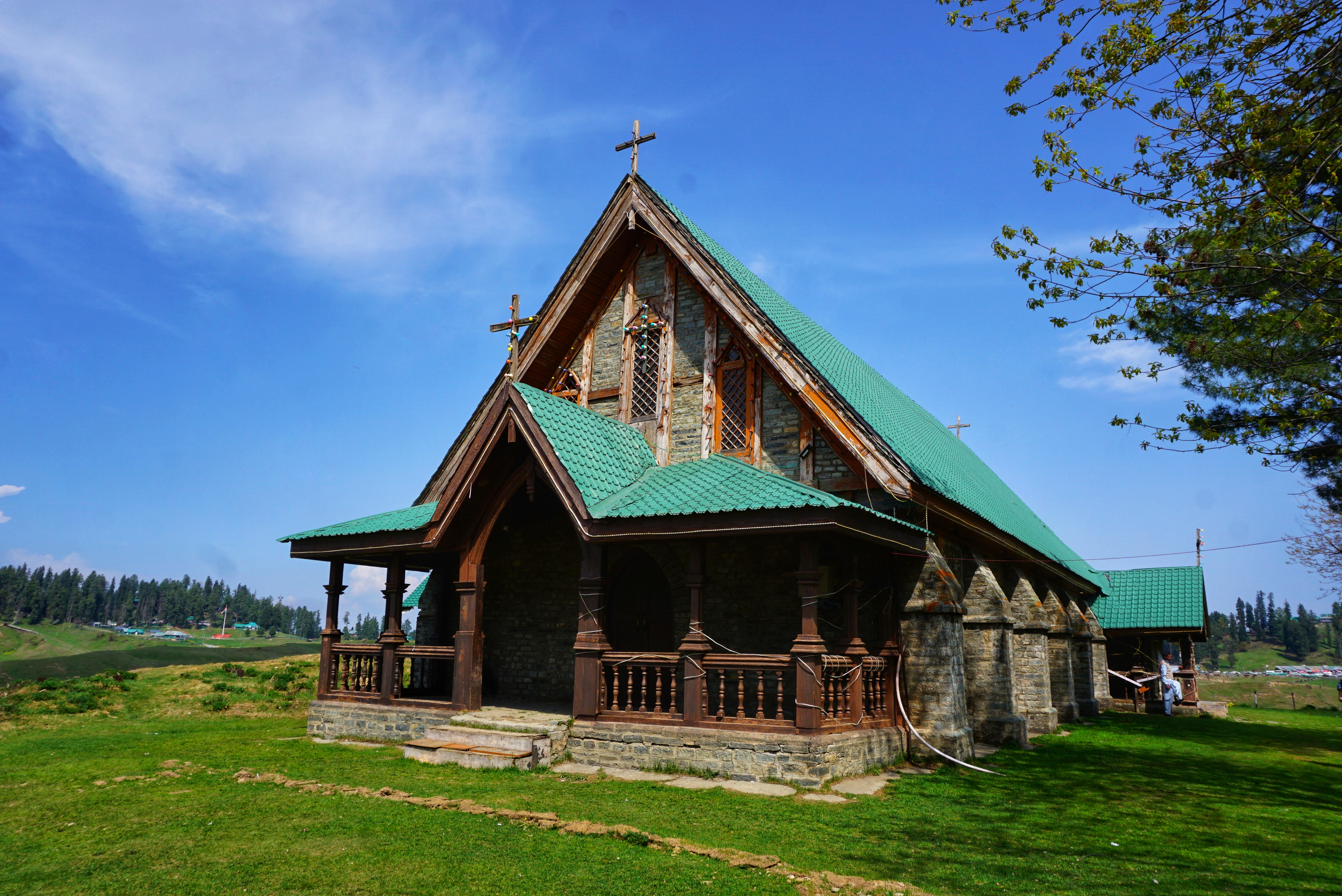
St Mary's Church

Maharani Temple (also known as Shiv Temple) was built by Maharaja Hari Singh for his wife Maharani Mohini Bai Sisodia in 1915. The temple is dedicated to Hindu god Shiva and his consort Parvati. St Mary's Church is located in the valley of shepherds in Gulmarg. It was built in 1902, with outer walls made of grey bricks, a green roof and decorated wooden interior walls. In 1920, the church served as the location of the wedding of the brother of British cartoonist Bruce Bairnsfather. It was closed for years before being renovated and reopened in 2003, holding its first Christmas service there after 14 years.

An annual three-day Gulmarg Winter Festival is held in March. Artists from the fields of music, film and photography showcase their work during the festival.

== Transportation ==
Gulmarg is accessible from Srinagar by road via Tangmarg. The road includes a 12 km (7.5 mi) uphill segment that passes through forests of pine and fir. The nearest railhead is at Baramulla, about 53 km (33 mi) from Gulmarg. The nearest major airport is the Srinagar International Airport at Srinagar, about 53 km (33 mi) from the town.

== Sports and recreation ==
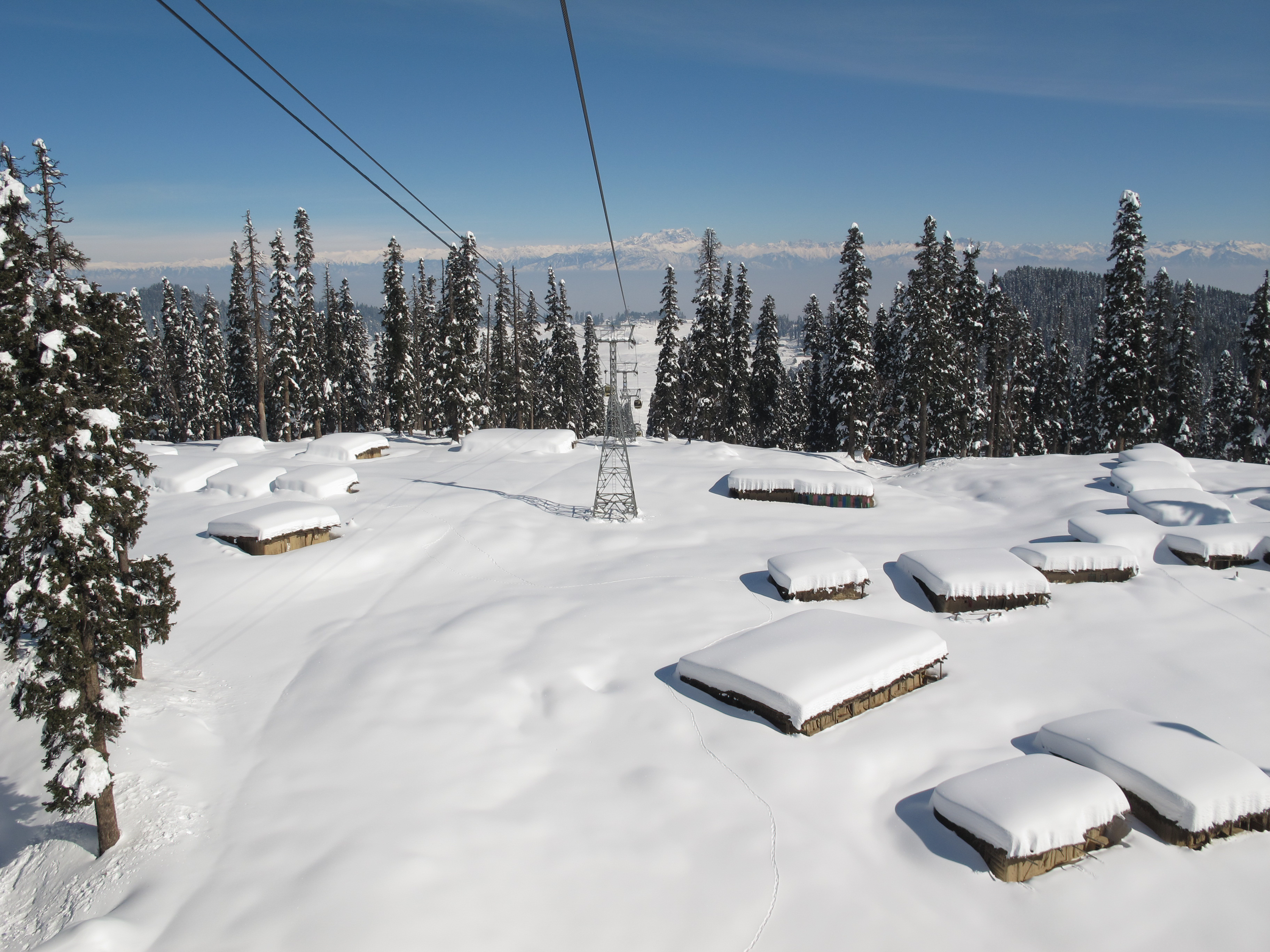
Downhill view from Gulmarg Gondola

Gulmarg is one of the popular destinations for winter games in India. It hosted the National Winter Games in 1998, 2004 and 2008. The first-ever Khelo India Winter Games was held in March 2020 at Gulmarg. CNN mentioned Gulmarg as the "heartland of winter sports in India" and rated it amongst the top ten ski destinations in Asia.

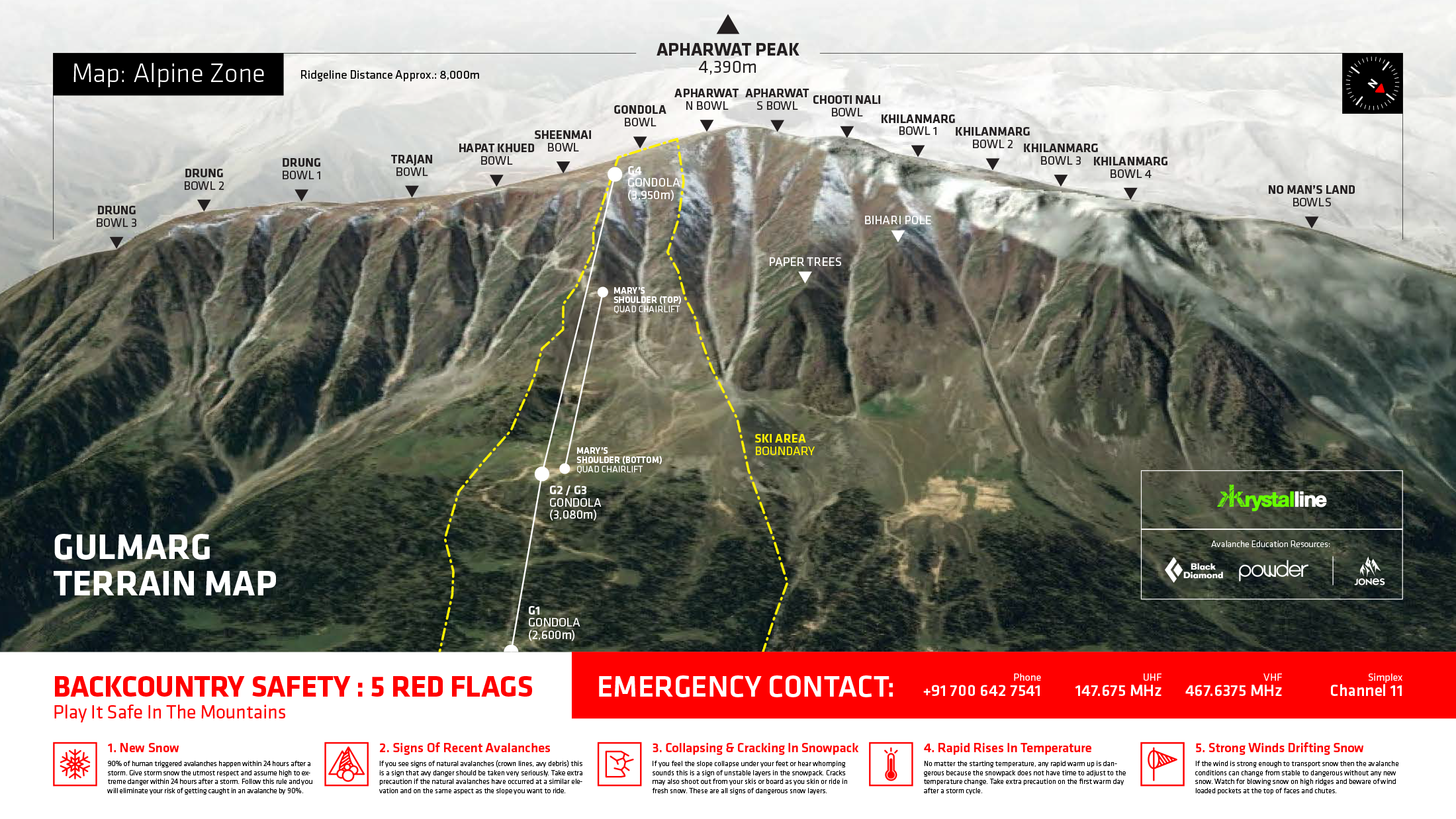
Ski resort terrain map

Skiing, tobogganing, snowboarding and heli-skiing take place on the slopes of Mount Apharwat, which is reachable by a Gondola lift. Built by the French company Pomagalski, the Gulmarg Gondola is the second-highest in the world. The two-stage, five-kilometer ropeway project between Gulmarg and Apharwat was commissioned by the Government of Jammu and Kashmir in 1987. Construction was halted in 1990 due to security concerns, then resumed in 1998. The first phase connects Gulmarg with Kongdori at 2,600 m (8,530 ft) and began operations in May 1998. In May 2005, the second phase connecting Kongdori with a shoulder on Apharwat peak at 4,100 m (13,500 ft) was completed in 2011. A 3.2 km (2.0 mi)-long chair lift system connects Kongdoori with Mary's shoulder, which is used for taking skiers to higher altitudes in the winter.

In February 2022, the world's largest igloo cafe, measuring 37.5 ft (11.4 m) high and 44.5 ft (13.6 m) in diameter, opened in Gulmarg. In February 2023, a glass igloo restaurant was built in Gulmarg.

== In popular culture ==
Gulmarg is a popular location for film shooting, and various Bollywood films have been shot here.

== See also ==
- Amarnath Temple
- Baba Reshi
- Kausar Nag
- Kokernag
- Pahalgam
- Sonamarg
